= Catch Me If You Can (game show) season 1 =

Television game show season

Catch Me If You Can
- Season 1
- Hosted by: Vladimir Markony
- Score sheet: Games: ★ Stars 2–5 ✱ Invaders; Points: ★ Stars 61–65 ✱ Invaders
- No. of episodes: 7

Release
- Original network: Rossiya-1
- Original release: 24 May – 5 July 2024

Additional information
- Filming dates: 16 February – 19 February 2024

Season chronology
- Next → Season 2

The first season of the Russian television mystery music game show Catch Me If You Can premiered on Rossiya-1 on 24 May 2024.

VGTRK was supposedly announced to revive Ya vizhu tvoy golos into renewing a second season, according to a post from Andy Goldred as part of upcoming programmes for the 2024–25 television season dated back January 2024, but subsequently opted to produce their own "breakaway" game show without the involvement of CJ ENM and/or Fremantle, which is considered to be a domestic response to the Russian invasion of Ukraine.

Due to the former "breakaway" programme implementing its own "invasion format" (a variation of the "battle format" that resembles from Giọng ải giọng ai), as well as its direct relation to the original counterpart Ya vizhu tvoy golos, of which are both included in the existing I Can See Your Voice franchise, this season is counted as first for a unofficial adaptation and second overall for the Russian franchise.

== Gameplay ==
The game is played in two phases, featuring two opposing teams — a team of four guest artists (known as "stars") and a team of mystery singers performing in batches (known as "invaders").

=== Rounds ===
==== Lip sync phase ====
Each mystery singer performs a lip sync to a song; good singers mime to a recording of their own, while bad singers mime to a backing track by another vocalist. After the "stage of truth" performances, they are now allowed to talk freely.

If the guest artists guessed the mystery singer right, they get points depending on batch, otherwise the mystery singers did the same points have if they guessed wrong.

1. Solo batches (1 pt)
  Each mystery singer individually performs a lip sync. At the end of each round, the guest artists are deliberated to predict whether a mystery singer is good or bad.
2. Showdown batches (2 pts)
  A pair of mystery singers, donning in their "work attires", perform a lip sync of their own through a showdown. Afterward, the guest artists are deliberated to predict which one of the mystery singers in a single batch is bad (until the following one below).
3. Trio batches (3 pts)
  Divided into three groups of three mystery singers impersonating by a designated artist, each of them have to perform a lip sync of their own.

==== Dark horse ====
A "surprise" mystery singer dubbed the "dark horse" (Russian: Темная лошадка) is appeared on the "stage of truth"; the highest-scoring team or both of two (if the game ends in a tie) would have do the same mechanic as the lip sync solo phase. The winning team is determined on two different conclusions:

- If either guest artists or mystery singers guessed the "dark horse" right, they win 1,000,000 ₽; if either guessed them wrong, their money is given to the opposing team instead. As for the mystery singers, that same money is distributed into 18 players, with ≈56,000 ₽ each.
- If both teams guessed the "dark horse" right, that same money is split and would receive 500,000 ₽ each, with ≈28,000 ₽ per player on the mystery singers' side.

== Episodes ==
Legend:
Good singer	✱ — The "invaders" scored point(s).
Bad singer	— Either team guessed the mystery singer right.
★ — The "stars" scored point(s).	— Either team guessed the mystery singer wrong.

Episode		★ Stars (Guest artists)	Score		Dark horse	✱ Invaders (Mystery singers; also including opponents' guesses in their respective numbers)						
#	Date	★ Stars (Guest artists)	Score		Dark horse	Solos	Showdown #1	Showdown #2	Showdown #3	Trios #1	Trios #2	Trios #3
1	24 May 2024	Nadezhda Babkina, Alexander Buinov, Larisa Dolina, (Note: Foreign guest artists: Azerbaijan — Larisa Dolina (ep. 1); Belarus — Elena Vorobey (ep. 4); Georgia — Soso Pavliashvili (ep. 6); Ukraine — Natasha Korolyova, Aleksandr Panayotov (ep. 3), Alena Sviridova (ep. 4), Ani Lorak (ep. 6), (Note: Season highlights: Crossovers from the original Russian counterpart: Panelist ST played as a newcomer while Ani Lorak returned on her 2nd game, when she last played for the finale.; Bad singer Helena Ambogo (ep. 3) also returned on her 2nd game as a participant, when she last performed in the 5th episode.) Stas Kostyushkin, and Lyubov Uspenskaya (ep. 7); Uzbekistan — Dmitry Kharatyan (ep. 4)) and ST	12 → 1,000,000 ₽	6	Ernest Mackevičius	1. Ekaterina Kirisheva → ★ +1; 2. Sofia Moraru → ✱ +1; 3. Maksim Popov → ★ +1	→ ★ +2: 4. Karina Belkina; 5. Ekaterina Tementseva	→ ★ +2: 6. Vitaly Silyutin; 7. Andrei Semakov	→ ✱ +2: 8. Angelina Titova; 9. Pelageya Rastopchina	Elvis Presley → ★ +3: 10. Roman Rauling; 11. Alexander Sofiichuk; 12. Roman Ivanov	Lyubov Uspenskaya → ✱ +3: 13. Tatiana Savochkina; 14. Elena Varina; 15. Svetlana Zhdanova	Larisa Dolina → ★ +3: 16. Nadezhda Karmaeva; 17. Olga Samoylova; 18. Svetlana Ryakhina
2	31 May 2024	Masha Rasputina, Maksim Dunayevsky, Natalia Medvedeva, and Valeriya	5	13 → 1,000,000 ₽	Alexander Dobrovinsky	1. Vladimir Park → ✱ +1; 2. Anastasia Kyivskaya → ✱ +1; 3. Kiril Chaprov → ★ +1	→ ★ +2: 4. Tatiana Rekson; 5. Yulia Osipova	→ ✱ +2: 6. Natalia Kurganova; 7. Evgenia Katalia	→ ★ +2: 8. Artyom Babinov; 9. Yuri Leontiev	Edith Piaf → ✱ +3: 10. Angelina Ermakova; 11. Sofia Babich; 12. Ekaterina Korotkova	Elena Vaenga → ✱ +3: 13. Darina Zhelyazkova; 14. Natalia Rastorguyeva; 15. Alexandra Grin	Michael Jackson → ✱ +3: 16. Daria Daniletskaya; 17. Gabriel Alexandrov; 18. Ivan Makhrushev
3	7 June 2024	Anna Ardova, Aleksandr Panayotov, Natasha Korolyova, and Sergey Sosedov	11 → 0 ₽	7 1,000,000 ₽	Tamara Globa	1. Kairat Shaykiev → ✱ +1; 2. Oksana Miroshina → ✱ +1; 3. Sergei Krylov → ★ +1	→ ✱ +2: 4. Viktoria Drozdova; 5. Karina Arbeliany	→ ★ +2: 6. Kristina Gartmann; 7. Elena Lebel	→ ★ +2: 8. Irina Chumakova; 9. Helena Ambogo	Adele → ✱ +3: 10. Viktoria Sukhinina; 11. Aset Samrailova; 12. Anna Fedoseeva	Lyudmila Gurchenko → ★ +3: 13. Nadezhda Alekseeva; 14. Mira Yanaeva; 15. Larisa Barava	Nikolay Baskov → ★ +3: 16. Svetoslav Fomin; 17. Nikolai Agafonov; 18. Dmitry Shtamin
4	14 June 2024	Dmitry Kharatyan, Alexandra Revenko, Alena Sviridova, and Elena Vorobey	10 → 1,000,000 ₽	8	Svetlana Khorkina	1. Kazbek Artsuiev → ✱ +1; 2. Irina Chubarova → ✱ +1; 3. Konstantin Kopeykin → ✱ +1	→ ★ +2: 4. Jamilla Habibulina; 5. Hava Sanfina	→ ✱ +2: 6. Dmitry Ivanov; 7. Dmitri Galakhteonov	→ ★ +2: 8. Anton Ivantsov; 9. Stepan Romanenko	Mikhail Boyarsky → ★ +3: 10. Konstantin Fisko; 11. Andrei Goryushin; 12. Evgeny Lyupi	Olga Kormukhina → ✱ +3: 13. Svetlana Kokorina; 14. Elmira Tereshko; 15. Yulia Litosh	Valery Leontiev → ★ +3: 16. Artur Leontiev; 17. Alexey Maikov; 18. Artur Bogdanov
5	21 June 2024	Ivan Agapov, Mikhail Politseymako, Yulia Savicheva, and Anna Semenovich	7	11 → 1,000,000 ₽	Evgeny Papunaishvili	1. Zanbek Kulbatyrov → ★ +1; 2. Maria Iliena → ★ +1; 3. Elmira Askerova → ✱ +1	→ ★ +2: 4. Vadim Plyushnin; 5. Vadim Reznik	→ ✱ +2: 6. Anastasia Ivlicheva; 7. Aida Gazizulina	→ ✱ +2: 8. Andrey Khramov; 9. Ilya Erofeyev	Leonid Agutin → ✱ +3: 10. Denis Vinogradov; 11. Nikita Belko; 12. Ilya Bykov	Masha Rasputina → ✱ +3: 13. Malisha Sedogina; 14. Ksyusha Savelieva; 15. Olesha Golubka	Patricia Kaas → ★ +3: 16. Anna Savinkova; 17. Olesha Butova; 18. Anastasia Kuklina
6	28 June 2024	Tatiana Bulanova, Vanya Dmitrienko, Ani Lorak, and Soso Pavliashvili	10 → 0 ₽	8 1,000,000 ₽	Anatoly Wasserman	1. Viktor Nosikov → ✱ +1; 2. Ekaterina Skorodumova → ✱ +1; 3. Alex Abra → ★ +1	→ ★ +2: 4. Elena Zavgorodnaya; 5. Alexandra Sheberstova	→ ★ +2: 6. Miron Sinyakov; 7. Albert Jalilov	→ ★ +2: 8. Evgeny Engelhardt; 9. Vladislav Zhukov	Mireille Mathieu → ✱ +3: 10. Karina Bayeva; 11. Tatiana Yusifova; 12. Natasha Sergienko	Irina Allegrova → ✱ +3: 13. Tatiana Istomina; 14. Elena Semyonova; 15. Svetlana Karetnikova	Andrei Mironov → ★ +3: 16. Emil Sales; 17. Andrei Ovchinnikov; 18. Evgeny Kochergin
7	5 July 2024	Alyona Apina, Stas Kostyushkin, Khabib Sharipov, and Lyubov Uspenskaya	6	12 → 1,000,000 ₽	Maria Mironova	1. Vyacheslav Gravaetsky → ✱ +1; 2. Maksim Larichev → ✱ +1; 3. Shushana Khachaturian → ✱ +1	→ ★ +2: 4. Lisa Kochurak; 5. Tatiana Ryseva	→ ★ +2: 6. Bulat Bikaev; 7. Evgeny Devetyarov	→ ★ +2: 8. Angela Ivanova; 9. Amina Begoeva	Liza Minnelli → ✱ +3: 10. Valeria Milova; 11. Olga Lyuchetskaya; 12. Maria Avdeeva	Yuri Shatunov → ✱ +3: 13. Andrey Savchenko; 14. Alexei Frintsev; 15. Sergey Bakhrimov	Aleksander Serov → ✱ +3: 16. Alex Kane; 17. Pavel Kubasov; 18. Alex Gera

== Reception ==
Legend:
Highest rated episode
Lowest rated episode

No.	Title	Air date	Timeslot (MSK)	Grp. 18–54 Points				OVA Points			
No.	Title	Air date	Timeslot (MSK)	Rank	Rating	Share	Coverage	Rank	Rating	Share	Coverage
1	"Nadezhda Babkina, Alexander Buinov, Larisa Dolina, and ST"	24 May 2024	Friday, 21:30	47	1.1%	7.7%	3.7%	10	2.7%	13.5%	7.7%
2	"Masha Rasputina, Maksim Dunayevsky, Natalia Medvedeva, and Valeriya"	31 May 2024	Friday, 21:30	46	1.1%	7.6%	3.5%	13	2.7%	13.8%	7.6%
3	"Anna Ardova, Aleksandr Panayotov, Natasha Korolyova, and Sergey Sosedov"	7 June 2024	Friday, 21:30	56	1%	7.4%	3.5%	14	2.6%	13.3%	7%
4	"Dmitry Kharatyan, Alexandra Revenko, Alena Sviridova, and Elena Vorobey"	14 June 2024	Friday, 21:30	44	1.2%	7.6%	3.5%	9	2.9%	13.7%	7.4%
5	"Ivan Agapov, Mikhail Politseymako, Yulia Savicheva, and Anna Semenovich"	21 June 2024	Friday, 21:30	36	1.3%	8.3%	3.5%	10	2.9%	14.6%	7.4%
6	"Tatiana Bulanova, Vanya Dmitrienko, Ani Lorak, and Soso Pavliashvili"	28 June 2024	Friday, 21:30	22	1.5%	10.2%	4.1%	9	2.9%	14.8%	7.7%
7	"Alyona Apina, Stas Kostyushkin, Khabib Sharipov, and Lyubov Uspenskaya"	5 July 2024	Friday, 21:30	30	1.3%	7.7%	4.1%	6	3.1%	14.9%	8.3%

Source: MediaScope
