= Catch Me If You Can (game show) season 2 =

Television game show season

Catch Me If You Can
- Season 2
- Hosted by: Vladimir Markony
- Score sheet: Games: ★ Stars 0–6 ✱ Invaders; 1 draw; Points: ★ Stars 49–77 ✱ Invaders
- No. of episodes: 7

Release
- Original network: Rossiya-1
- Original release: 16 May – 4 July 2025

Additional information
- Filming dates: 14 February 2025

Season chronology
- ← Previous; Season 1 Next → Season 3

The second season of the Russian television mystery music game show Catch Me If You Can premiered on Rossiya-1 on 16 May 2025.

Due to the former "breakaway" programme implementing its own "invasion format" (a variation of the "battle format" that resembles from Giọng ải giọng ai), as well as its direct relation to the original counterpart Ya vizhu tvoy golos, of which are both included in the existing I Can See Your Voice franchise, this season is counted as second for a unofficial adaptation and third overall for the Russian franchise.

== Gameplay ==
The game is played in two phases, featuring two opposing teams — a team of four guest artists (known as "stars") and a team of mystery singers performing in batches (known as "invaders").

=== Rounds ===
==== Lip sync phase ====
Each mystery singer performs a lip sync to a song; good singers mime to a recording of their own, while bad singers mime to a backing track by another vocalist. After the "stage of truth" performances, they are now allowed to talk freely.

If the guest artists guessed the mystery singer right, they get points depending on batch, otherwise the mystery singers did the same points have if they guessed wrong.

1. Solo batches (1 pt)
  Each mystery singer individually performs a lip sync. At the end of each round, the guest artists are deliberated to predict whether a mystery singer is good or bad.
2. Showdown batches (2 pts)
  A pair of mystery singers, donning in their "work attires", perform a lip sync of their own through a showdown. Afterward, the guest artists are deliberated to predict which one of the mystery singers in a single batch is bad (until the following one below).
3. Trio batches (3 pts)
  Divided into three groups of three mystery singers impersonating by a designated artist, each of them have to perform a lip sync of their own.

==== Dark horse ====
A "surprise" mystery singer dubbed the "dark horse" (Russian: Темная лошадка) is appeared on the "stage of truth"; the highest-scoring team or both of two (if the game ends in a tie) would have do the same mechanic as the lip sync solo phase. The winning team is determined on two different conclusions:

- If either guest artists or mystery singers guessed the "dark horse" right, they win 1,000,000 ₽; if either guessed them wrong, their money is given to the opposing team instead. As for the mystery singers, that same money is distributed into 18 players, with ≈56,000 ₽ each.
- If both teams guessed the "dark horse" right, that same money is split and would receive 500,000 ₽ each, with ≈28,000 ₽ per player on the mystery singers' side.

== Episodes ==
Legend:
Good singer	✱ — The "invaders" scored point(s).
Bad singer	— Either team guessed the mystery singer right.
★ — The "stars" scored point(s).	— Either team guessed the mystery singer wrong.

Episode		★ Stars (Guest artists)	Score		Dark horse	✱ Invaders (Mystery singers; also including opponents' guesses in their respective numbers)						
#	Date	★ Stars (Guest artists)	Score		Dark horse	Solos	Showdown #1	Showdown #2	Showdown #3	Trios #1	Trios #2	Trios #3
1	16 May 2025	Valeriya, Natalia Podolskaya, (Note: Foreign guest artists: Azerbaijan — Larisa Dolina and Yevgeny Petrosyan (ep. 6); Belarus — Natalia Podolskaya (ep. 1); Bulgaria — Philipp Kirkorov (ep. 4) (Note: Season highlights: Philipp Kirkorov (Bulgaria, ep. 4) and Alexey Chumakov (Uzbekistan, ep. 6) also returned on their 2nd game, when they last played for the original Russian counterpart.; Maria Mironova (ep. 5) also returned on her 2nd game, when she last played as a "dark horse".); Germany — Anna Kovalchuk (ep. 2); Kazakhstan — Lera Kudryavtseva (ep. 2); Ukraine — Nonna Grishayeva (ep. 2), Klara Novikova (ep. 3), Aleksandr Panayotov, Aleksander Serov (ep. 5), and Gosha Kutsenko (ep. 7); Uzbekistan — Dmitry Kharatyan (ep. 2) and Alexey Chumakov (ep. 6)) Vladimir Presnyakov Jr., and Iosif Prigozhin	7	11 → 1,000,000 ₽	Nikas Safronov	1. Mikhail Belokhvostov → ★ +1; 2. Roman Koval → ★ +1; 3. Eleanora Dyatkova → ★ +1	→ ★ +2: 4. Tatiana Sergeeva; 5. Evgenia Shyolakova	→ ★ +2: 6. Stepan Shcherbakov; 7. Gabriel Vadava	→ ✱ +2: 8. Polina Arlova; 9. Ekaterina Alushyna	Anzhelika Varum → ✱ +3: 10. Alexandra Pavliuk; 11. Irina Sergeeva; 12. Daria Kotava	Valeriya → ✱ +3: 13. Kristina Budionev; 14. Alyona Garishkova; 15. Viktoria Saba	Christina Aguilera → ✱ +3: 16. Anastasia Kalonina; 17. Daria Baibakova; 18. Alexandra Dogusheva
2	23 May 2025	Nonna Grishayeva, Dmitry Kharatyan, Anna Kovalchuk, and Lera Kudryavtseva	5	13 → 1,000,000 ₽	Mariya Kiselyova	1. Igor Ivanov → ★ +1; 2. Alexander Kustov → ★ +1; 3. Maria Kolezova → ★ +1	→ ★ +2: 4. Rudik Rodenkov; 5. Danil Roman	→ ✱ +2: 6. Valentina Khershuna; 7. Olga Mirkulova	→ ✱ +2: 8. Daria Zavrikina; 9. Iliena Lukashuyeva	Mikhail Shufutinsky → ✱ +3: 10. Levon Balan; 11. Vladimir Buinov; 12. Damian Makharov	Lyubov Orlova → ✱ +3: 13. Vardui Giorgian; 14. Vassilina Daineka; 15. Iliana Maguche	Cher → ✱ +3: 16. Inna Rachman; 17. Olga Kipesh; 18. Evgenia Sui
3	30 May 2025	Katya Lel, Igor Nikolayev, Klara Novikova, and Yan Tsapnik	4	14 → 1,000,000 ₽	Anton Demidov and Aleksander Yakovlev	1. Alexei Finsky → ★ +1; 2. Ekaterina Vasina → ✱ +1; 3. Vladimir Rudkovsky → ★ +1	→ ★ +2: 4. Alina Lebedeva; 5. Alexander Bashkirtsev	→ ✱ +2: 6. Tali Pokatskaya; 7. Sergey Tikhomirov	→ ✱ +2: 8. Azalia Gainidzhinova; 9. Yasmin Muqimova	Britney Spears → ✱ +3: 10. Yulia Dmitrieva; 11. Alina Glushkova; 12. Yaroslava Buriak	Dima Bilan → ✱ +3: 13. Mikhail Luyev; 14. Alexander Semyonov; 15. Aidar Minaev	Boney M. → ✱ +3: 16. Angelique Jackson; 17. Lari Kassambarari; 18. Felipa Richas
4	6 June 2025	Philipp Kirkorov, Andrey Malakhov, Sergey Shakurov, and Klava Koka	8	10 → 1,000,000 ₽	Darya Dontsova	1. Sergey Grigoriev → ✱ +1; 2. Kamila Kiselnikova → ★ +1; 3. Daria Syvatova → ✱ +1	→ ★ +2: 4. Dmitry Vasiliev; 5. Anna Bologova	→ ★ +2: 6. Elena Solovyova; 7. Alexandra Tarasova	→ ✱ +2: 8. Farida Bakhritdinova; 9. Larisa Bakai	Lady Gaga → ★ +3: 10. Barbara Tubina; 11. Adelina Jafarova; 12. Anna Lebedeva	Alexander Buinov → ✱ +3: 13. Alexander Bazhanov; 14. Andrei Tselyakov; 15. Evgeny Lepikhin	Nadezhda Kadysheva → ✱ +3: 16. Natalia Vasilieva; 17. Ekaterina Ivaney; 18. Ekaterina Brinchukova
5	11 June 2025	Valya Karnaval, Maria Mironova, Aleksandr Panayotov, and Aleksander Serov	5	13 → 1,000,000 ₽	Ashkold and Edgard Zapashny	1. Lyudmila Kushkina → ✱ +1; 2. Kheytak Gaziev → ✱ +1; 3. Artur Kim → ★ +1	→ ★ +2: 4. Svetlana Grigorieva; 5. Maria Mustafayeva	→ ✱ +2: 6. Nikita Murashkov; 7. Maria Zatsepina	→ ★ +2: 8. Vladimir Paplinsky; 9. Daniil Cherkassov	Natalya Seleznyova → ✱ +3: 10. Yulia Tsurgan; 11. Maria Krosheninnikova; 12. Anastasia Devyatikh	Madonna → ✱ +3: 13. Yulia Romanova; 14. Janna Zhigalkova; 15. Viktoria Fralova	Yuri Antonov → ✱ +3: 16. Vladimir Mikhyn; 17. Nikolav Gusev; 18. Alexander Salman
6	20 June 2025	Alexey Chumakov, Larisa Dolina, Anastasiya Makeyeva, and Yevgeny Petrosyan	11 → 0 ₽	7 1,000,000 ₽	Jeff Monson	1. Irina Pavlova → ✱ +1; 2. Dmitry Bylko → ★ +1; 3. Alexander Voikov → ✱ +1	→ ★ +2: 4. Irene Zakhary; 5. Viktoria Karchegina	→ ★ +2: 6. Alexander Brikhin; 7. Blatt Halcoff	→ ✱ +2: 8. Anatasia Shventarnaya; 9. Maria Naumova	Demis Roussos → ★ +3: 10. Eduard Chervetkov; 11. Roman Kravtsov; 12. Alexander Argibovsky	Zhanna Aguzarova → ★ +3: 13. Dina Igdal; 14. Svetlana Zbarskaya; 15. Branika Igorova	Inva Mula (Note: Season impersonations: Inva Mula (ep. 6) — provided the singing vocals of Diva Plavalaguna in the 1997 film The Fifth Element; Tatyana Voronina (ep. 7) — provided the singing vocals of Mary Poppins in the 1984 film Mary Poppins, Goodbye) → ✱ +3: 16. Lyubo Ardieva; 17. Aglaya Babarikina; 18. Tatiana Cam
7	4 July 2025	Gosha Kutsenko, Viktor Saltykov, Katerina Shpitsa, and Vladimir Vinokur	9 → 500,000 ₽	9 → 500,000 ₽	Yelena Khanga	1. Oleg Prokuratov → ✱ +1; 2. Denis Petrenko → ✱ +1; 3. Ksenia Apatenko → ★ +1	→ ★ +2: 4. Viktor Samoylenko; 5. Mikhail Panfilov	→ ✱ +2: 6. Tatiana Balyovneva; 7. Natalia Shevchenko	→ ✱ +2: 8. Vadim Baranov; 9. Aleksander Kovalev	Tatyana Voronina → ✱ +3: 10. Katerina Lazukova; 11. Svetlana Popova; 12. Margarita Shebyrshina	Jennifer Lopez → ★ +3: 13. Anisa Murtayeva; 14. Anna Mayur; 15. Maria Mayorskaya	Irina Ponarovskaya → ★ +3: 16. Valentina Zhikova; 17. Karina Raum; 18. Maria Saltykova

== Reception ==
Legend:
Highest rated episode
Lowest rated episode

No.	Title	Air date	Timeslot (MSK)	Grp. 18–54 Points				OVA Points			
No.	Title	Air date	Timeslot (MSK)	Rank	Rating	Share	Coverage	Rank	Rating	Share	Coverage
1	"Valeriya, Natalia Podolskaya, Vladimir Presnyakov Jr., and Iosif Prigozhin"	16 May 2025	Friday, 21:30	45	1.2%	7.6%	3.9%	12	3.1%	14.9%	7.9%
2	"Nonna Grishayeva, Dmitry Kharatyan, Anna Kovalchuk, and Lera Kudryavtseva"	23 May 2025	Friday, 21:30	64	1.1%	6.7%	3.5%	12	2.8%	12.8%	7.5%
3	"Katya Lel, Igor Nikolayev, Klara Novikova, and Yan Tsapnik"	30 May 2025	Friday, 21:30	72	1.1%	7.1%	3.3%	13	2.7%	12.4%	7%
4	"Philipp Kirkorov, Andrey Malakhov, Sergey Shakurov, and Klava Koka"	6 June 2025	Friday, 21:30	61	1.1%	7.6%	3.7%	13	2.8%	14.3%	7.5%
5	"Valya Karnaval, Maria Mironova, Aleksandr Panayotov, and Aleksander Serov"	11 June 2025	Wednesday, 21:30	21	1.5%	9.6%	4.1%	31	2.1%	11.7%	6.5%
6	"Alexey Chumakov, Larisa Dolina, Anastasiya Makeyeva, and Yevgeny Petrosyan"	20 June 2025	Friday, 21:30	71	1.1%	6.9%	3.5%	11	2.9%	14%	7.3%
7	"Gosha Kutsenko, Viktor Saltykov, Katerina Shpitsa, and Vladimir Vinokur"	4 July 2025	Friday, 21:30	30	1.3%	8%	3.9%	8	3%	14.2%	7.9%

Source: MediaScope
