= Catch Me If You Can (game show) season 3 =

Television game show season

Catch Me If You Can
- Season 3
- Hosted by: Vladimir Markony
- Score sheet: Games: ★ Stars 3–3 ✱ Invaders; Points: ★ Stars 53–55 ✱ Invaders
- No. of episodes: 6

Release
- Original network: Rossiya-1
- Original release: 15 May – 26 June 2026

Additional information
- Filming dates: 15 February – 19 February 2026

Season chronology
- ← Previous; Season 2

The third season of the Russian television mystery music game show Catch Me If You Can premiered on Rossiya-1 on 15 May 2026.

Due to the former "breakaway" programme implementing its own "invasion format" (a variation of the "battle format" that resembles from Giọng ải giọng ai), as well as its direct relation to the original counterpart Ya vizhu tvoy golos, of which are both included in the existing I Can See Your Voice franchise, this season is counted as third for a unofficial adaptation and fourth overall for the Russian franchise.

== Gameplay ==
The game is played in two phases, featuring two opposing teams — a team of four guest artists (known as "stars") and a team of mystery singers performing in batches (known as "invaders").

=== Rounds ===
==== Lip sync phase ====
Each mystery singer performs a lip sync to a song; good singers mime to a recording of their own, while bad singers mime to a backing track by another vocalist. After the "stage of truth" performances, they are now allowed to talk freely.

If the guest artists guessed the mystery singer right, they get points depending on batch, otherwise the mystery singers did the same points have if they guessed wrong.

1. Solo batches (1 pt)
  Each mystery singer individually performs a lip sync. At the end of each round, the guest artists are deliberated to predict whether a mystery singer is good or bad.
2. Showdown batches (2 pts)
  A pair of mystery singers, donning in their "work attires", perform a lip sync of their own through a showdown. Afterward, the guest artists are deliberated to predict which one of the mystery singers in a single batch is bad (until the following one below).
3. Trio batches (3 pts)
  Divided into three groups of three mystery singers impersonating by a designated artist, each of them have to perform a lip sync of their own.

==== Dark horse ====
A "surprise" mystery singer dubbed the "dark horse" (Russian: Темная лошадка) is appeared on the "stage of truth"; the highest-scoring team or both of two (if the game ends in a tie) would have do the same mechanic as the lip sync solo phase. The winning team is determined on two different conclusions:

- If either guest artists or mystery singers guessed the "dark horse" right, they win 1,000,000 ₽; if either guessed them wrong, their money is given to the opposing team instead. As for the mystery singers, that same money is distributed into 18 players, with ≈56,000 ₽ each.
- If both teams guessed the "dark horse" right, that same money is split and would receive 500,000 ₽ each, with ≈28,000 ₽ per player on the mystery singers' side.

== Episodes ==
Legend:
Good singer	✱ — The "invaders" scored point(s).
Bad singer	— Either team guessed the mystery singer right.
★ — The "stars" scored point(s).	— Either team guessed the mystery singer wrong.

Episode		★ Stars (Guest artists)	Score		Dark horse	✱ Invaders (Mystery singers; also including opponents' guesses in their respective numbers)						
#	Date	★ Stars (Guest artists)	Score		Dark horse	Solos	Showdown #1	Showdown #2	Showdown #3	Trios #1	Trios #2	Trios #3
1	15 May 2026	Pelageya, Philipp Kirkorov, (Note: Foreign guest artists: Belarus — Natalia Podolskaya (ep. 3, 5) and Elena Vorobey (ep. 6); Bulgaria — Philipp Kirkorov (ep. 1); Georgia — Soso Pavliashvili (ep. 1); Ukraine — Aleksandr Panayotov (ep. 1), Nonna Grishayeva (ep. 3), Stas Kostyushkin (ep. 5), and Natasha Korolyova (ep. 6); Uzbekistan — Dmitry Kharatyan (ep. 5)) Aleksandr Panayotov, and Soso Pavliashvili	7	11 → 1,000,000 ₽	Alexander Akopov	1. Olga Sharaukova → ★ +1; 2. Georgi Kuznetsov → ✱ +1; 3. Elena Skorikova → ★ +1	→ ★ +2: 4. Alexander Onishchenko; 5. Tatiana Sornova	→ ✱ +2: 6. Sergei Barovsky; 7. Yuri Pukov	→ ✱ +2: 8. Kristina Dasorets; 9. Yulia Devyeteva	Aleksandra Yakovleva → ★ +3: 10. Natalia Bogdova; 11. Yulia Ermonika; 12. Margarita Buzhina	Shura → ✱ +3: 13. Denis Gurianov; 14. Efim Dorievsky; 15. Alexander Kriptsov	Barbra Streisand → ✱ +3: 16. Yaroslava Pavlova; 17. Viktoria Tsurgan; 18. Oksana Ilianova
2	22 May 2026	Valeriya, Iosif Prigozhin, Khabib Sharipov, and Klava Koka	12 → 1,000,000 ₽	6	Vadim Vernik	1. Veronika Afendy → ✱ +1; 2. Danil Rakhmatullin → ★ +1; 3. Anna Safchenko → ★ +1	→ ✱ +2: 4. Alexander Prikhodko; 5. Anna Krivonogova	→ ★ +2: 6. Ivan Romanovich; 7. Danila Yutlin	→ ★ +2: 8. Yulia Saulidy; 9. Alexandra Slushentsova	Nikolay Rastorguyev → ✱ +3: 10. Valery Shiriayev; 11. Andrei Lamakin; 12. Vladislav Pavlovsky	Rina Zelyonaya → ★ +3: 13. Tasha Romanova; 14. Lyudmila Kashuta; 15. Elena Kuropatkina	Shakira → ★ +3: 16. Deliara Farkhiddinova; 17. Anastasia Bondarenko; 18. Tatiana Usacheva
3	29 May 2026	Nonna Grishayeva, Natalia Podolskaya, Vladimir Presnyakov Jr., and Aglaya Shilovskaya	7	11 → 1,000,000 ₽	Nikolai Valuev	1. Alexander Filipovsky → ★ +1; 2. Bogdan Besedin → ★ +1; 3. Anastasia Kulagina → ★ +1	→ ★ +2: 4. Yulia Levitskaya; 5. Stefan Chekhov	→ ★ +2: 6. Vladislav Povarkov; 7. Vladislav Shepovalov	→ ✱ +2: 8. Andrei Bordo; 9. Deliara Habibulina	Sia → ✱ +3: 10. Nicola Carolli; 11. Viktoria Grebenyuk; 12. Zarina Umarova	Alsou → ✱ +3: 13. Polina Yesenko; 14. Maria Kravets; 15. Diana Faizulina	Garik Sukachov → ✱ +3: 16. Nikita Shuklinov; 17. Sergey Kanaev; 18. Alexander Zeyfistov
4	5 June 2026	Nadezhda Babkina, Alexander Buinov, Denis Klyaver, and Ekaterina Skulkina	7 1,000,000 ₽	11 → 0 ₽	Andrey Urgant	1. Alexey Ivanov → ★ +1; 2. Guzel Sattarova → ★ +1; 3. Evgenia Klenova → ✱ +1	→ ✱ +2: 4. Ekaterina Eloyeva; 5. Dmitri Ray	→ ★ +2: 6. Evgenia Kudaeva; 7. Daria Smolentsova	→ ✱ +2: 8. Roman Sochian; 9. Evgeny Mukonin	Alexey Vorobyov → ★ +3: 10. Makar Smyslov; 11. Ilya Zhalnin; 12. German Frolov	Alla Pugacheva (Note: Season impersonations: Alla Pugacheva (ep. 4) — provided the singing vocals of Nadya Shevelyova in the 1976 television film The Irony of Fate, in which her character was also portrayed by Polish actress Barbara Brylska and dubbed over by Valentina Talyzina; Catherine Zeta-Jones (ep. 4) — portraying as Velma Kelly in the 2002 film Chicago; Aida Vedishcheva (ep. 5) — provided the singing vocals of Anna Sergeyevna in the 1969 film The Diamond Arm, in which her character was also portrayed by Svetlana Svetlichnaya; Jim Carrey (ep. 6) — portraying as Stanley Ipkiss in the 1994 film The Mask) → ✱ +3: 13. Yulia Latysheva; 14. Natalia Yesenina; 15. Olga Dolgikh	Catherine Zeta-Jones → ✱ +3: 16. Lilia Zamulina; 17. Maria Skibina; 18. Alyona Ter-Osipova
Season break: 12 June episode was pre-empted in observance of Russia Day.
5	19 June 2026	Dmitry Kharatyan, Stas Kostyushkin, Natalia Podolskaya, and Maria Zaitseva	10 → 0 ₽	8 1,000,000 ₽	Vladimir Sychyov	1. Andrey Ivanov → ✱ +1; 2. Janna Odnorog → ★ +1; 3. Mikhail Lysenko → ★ +1	→ ✱ +2: 4. Anastasia Kostromina; 5. Ekaterina Shyomina	→ ✱ +2: 6. Madina Bogotova; 7. Grigory Matyukhin	→ ★ +2: 8. Alexander Arshansky; 9. Anton Shurygin	Tatiana Kurtukova → ✱ +3: 10. Ekaterina Pochekaeva; 11. Alena Volkova; 12. Natalia Galieva	Robbie Williams → ★ +3: 13. Evgeny Dmitruk; 14. Ilya Basharatov; 15. Vladislav Grey	Aida Vedishcheva → ★ +3: 16. Kamila Zalieva; 17. Sofia Shmakova; 18. Evgenia Tolstaya
6	26 June 2026	Prokhor Chaliapin, Natasha Korolyova, Lada Dance, and Elena Vorobey	10 → 1,000,000 ₽	8	Galina Belyayeva	1. Maria Berg → ★ +1; 2. Sofia Prichikova → ✱ +1; 3. Nikita Mogilny → ★ +1	→ ✱ +2: 4. Karina Prozorova; 5. Valeriya Chornosova	→ ✱ +2: 6. Ekaterina Syribanova; 7. Ekaterina Kharitonova	→ ★ +2: 8. Alexander Tsarov; 9. Alexei Mayak	Lada Dance → ★ +3: 10. Anastasia Yerchukina; 11. Ekaterina Kormets; 12. Margarita Zakhovich	Diana Arbenina (Nochnye Snaipery) → ✱ +3: 13. Anna Kurzhinskaya; 14. Nafisha Nabiullina; 15. Kristina Isakh	Jim Carrey → ★ +3: 16. Ruslan Chabanov; 17. Sergei Sedlov; 18. Rinat Iskhakov

== Reception ==
Legend:
Highest rated episode
Lowest rated episode

No.	Title	Air date	Timeslot (MSK)	Grp. 18–54 Points				OVA Points			
No.	Title	Air date	Timeslot (MSK)	Rank	Rating	Share	Coverage	Rank	Rating	Share	Coverage
1	"Pelageya, Philipp Kirkorov, Aleksandr Panayotov, and Soso Pavliashvili"	15 May 2026	Friday, 21:30	61	1%	7.6%	3.3%	11	2.8%	14.5%	7.4%
2	"Valeriya, Iosif Prigozhin, Khabib Sharipov, and Klava Koka"	22 May 2026	Friday, 21:30	54	1%	7.4%	2.9%	15	2.4%	13%	6.4%
3	"Nonna Grishayeva, Natalia Podolskaya, Vladimir Presnyakov Jr., and Aglaya Shilovskaya"	29 May 2026	Friday, 21:30	75	1%	7%	3.3%	17	2.5%	12.7%	7%
4	"Nadezhda Babkina, Alexander Buinov, Denis Klyaver, and Ekaterina Skulkina"	5 June 2026	Friday, 21:30	34	1.1%	8.6%	3.3%	10	2.5%	13.8%	7%
5	"Dmitry Kharatyan, Stas Kostyushkin, Natalia Podolskaya, and Maria Zaitseva"	19 June 2026	Friday, 21:30	55	1.1%	7.2%	3.1%	11	2.6%	12.3%	6.8%
6	"Prokhor Chaliapin, Natasha Korolyova, Lada Dance, and Elena Vorobey"	26 June 2026	Friday, 21:30	92	0.9%	6.2%	2.9%	15	2.3%	12%	6.2%

Source: MediaScope
