= Catch Me If You Can (game show) =

Russian television game show

- Genre: Game show
- Created by: Sergey Kordo; Maria Simonyan; Sergey Shirokov
- Based on: I Can See Your Voice (original South Korean programme and format); Ya vizhu tvoy golos (original Russian adaptation); Giọng ải giọng ai (Vietnamese adaptation and battle format)
- Presented by: Vladimir Markony
- Country of origin: Russia
- Original language: Russian
- No. of seasons: 3
- No. of episodes: 20

Production
- Camera setup: Multi-camera
- Production company: Good Team Productions

Original release
- Network: Rossiya-1
- Release: 24 May 2024 – 26 June 2026

Related
- I Can See Your Voice franchise

Catch Me If You Can (Russian: Поймай меня, если сможешь, romanized: Poymay menya, esli smozhesh') is a Russian television mystery music game show, featuring its format where a team of guest artists attempt to identify good and bad singers through batches of mystery singers. It first aired on Rossiya-1 on 24 May 2024.

Instead of following the original South Korean rules, the series implemented its own "invasion format", a variation of the "battle format" that resembles from Giọng ải giọng ai. Being a "replacement" to the original counterpart Ya vizhu tvoy golos during wartime with Ukraine, the series designated as a unofficial adaptation that also technically included to the I Can See Your Voice franchise.

== Gameplay ==
The game is played in two phases, featuring two opposing teams — a team of four guest artists (known as "stars") and a team of mystery singers performing in batches (known as "invaders"). (Note: Gameplay notes: The number of mystery singers are set to 19, with 18 being part of team "invaders" and one "dark horse".; Also, an "invader" or a "dark horse" mystery singer can perform freely without accompanying guest artist(s) for a duet; these were introduced in the original South Korean 8th and 10th seasons.)

=== Rounds ===
==== Lip sync phase ====
Each mystery singer performs a lip sync to a song; good singers mime to a recording of their own, while bad singers mime to a backing track by another vocalist. After the "stage of truth" performances, they are now allowed to talk freely.

If the guest artists guessed the mystery singer right, they get points depending on batch, otherwise the mystery singers did the same points have if they guessed wrong.

1. Solo batches (1 pt)
  Each mystery singer individually performs a lip sync. At the end of each round, the guest artists are deliberated to predict whether a mystery singer is good or bad.
2. Showdown batches (2 pts)
  A pair of mystery singers, donning in their "work attires", perform a lip sync of their own through a showdown. Afterward, the guest artists are deliberated to predict which one of the mystery singers in a single batch is bad (until the following one below).
3. Trio batches (3 pts)
  Divided into three groups of three mystery singers impersonating by a designated artist, each of them have to perform a lip sync of their own.

==== Dark horse ====
A "surprise" mystery singer dubbed the "dark horse" (Russian: Темная лошадка) is appeared on the "stage of truth"; the highest-scoring team or both of two (if the game ends in a tie) would have do the same mechanic as the lip sync solo phase. The winning team is determined on two different conclusions:

- If either guest artists or mystery singers guessed the "dark horse" right, they win 1,000,000 ₽; if either guessed them wrong, their money is given to the opposing team instead. As for the mystery singers, that same money is distributed into 18 players, with ≈56,000 ₽ each.
- If both teams guessed the "dark horse" right, that same money is split and would receive 500,000 ₽ each, with ≈28,000 ₽ per player on the mystery singers' side.

== Production ==
As part of CJ ENM's multi-country licensing deals for I Can See Your Voice dated back November 2020, VGTRK formally acquired the rights to produce their own local adaptation as Ya vizhu tvoy golos (Russian: Я вижу твой голос), which debuted on 14 May 2021. In January 2024, a post by Andy Goldred as part of upcoming programmes for the 2024–25 television season initially announced that VGTRK would revive the original counterpart after a three-year hiatus by renewing into second season, but instead they opted to produce a "breakaway" game show of their own without the involvement of CJ ENM and/or Fremantle.

== Broadcast history ==
Catch Me If You Can debuted on 24 May 2024.

A post from Vse Kastingi in September 2024 announced the auditions for a then-upcoming second season, which was subsequently confirmed by VGTRK and began airing on 16 May 2025. In the closing remarks of its finale, host Markony also did the similar approach for an upcoming third season that commenced on 25 August 2025, and then premiered on 15 May 2026.

== Series overview ==
Series	Episodes	Originally released	
Series	Episodes	First released	Last released
1	7	24 May 2024	5 July 2024
2	7	16 May 2025	4 July 2025
3	6	15 May 2026	26 June 2026

In a span of 20 games, five of them had won from the "stars", 14 from the "invaders", and one game ended in a draw.

== Episodes ==
=== Season 1 (2024) ===
List of season 1 episodes
No. overall	No. in season	Guest artists	Player order (Note: It refers to the guest artist(s) that have played in according to their first game; returning guest artists (which also include foreigners or former good singers, with their names displaying in italics) are not counted.: As the unofficial adaptation of Ya vizhu tvoy golos, player order begins at 9, with 8th guest artist being Ani Lorak. (Note: Foreign guest artists: Azerbaijan — Larisa Dolina and Yevgeny Petrosyan; Belarus — Elena Vorobey and Natalia Podolskaya; Bulgaria — Philipp Kirkorov (Note: Highlights: Crossovers from the original Russian counterpart: s1: ST and Ani Lorak; s2: Philipp Kirkorov and Alexey Chumakov; Mystery singers returning as a member of team "stars": s2: Maria Mironova); Georgia — Soso Pavliashvili; Germany — Anna Kovalchuk; Kazakhstan — Lera Kudryavtseva; Ukraine — Natasha Korolyova, Aleksandr Panayotov, Alena Sviridova, Ani Lorak, Stas Kostyushkin, Lyubov Uspenskaya, Nonna Grishayeva, Klara Novikova, Aleksander Serov, and Gosha Kutsenko; Uzbekistan — Alexey Chumakov and Dmitry Kharatyan))	Dark horse	Original release date	RUS r/s/c points (national)
1	1	Nadezhda Babkina, Alexander Buinov, Larisa Dolina, and ST	9–12	Ernest Mackevičius	24 May 2024	2.7%/13.5%/7.7%
2	2	Masha Rasputina, Maksim Dunayevsky, Natalia Medvedeva, and Valeriya	13–16	Alexander Dobrovinsky	31 May 2024	2.7%/13.8%/7.6%
3	3	Anna Ardova, Aleksandr Panayotov, Natasha Korolyova, and Sergey Sosedov	17–20	Tamara Globa	7 June 2024	2.6%/13.3%/7%
4	4	Dmitry Kharatyan, Alexandra Revenko, Alena Sviridova, and Elena Vorobey	21–24	Svetlana Khorkina	14 June 2024	2.9%/13.7%/7.4%
5	5	Ivan Agapov, Mikhail Politseymako, Yulia Savicheva, and Anna Semenovich	25–28	Evgeny Papunaishvili	21 June 2024	2.9%/14.6%/7.4%
6	6	Tatiana Bulanova, Vanya Dmitrienko, Ani Lorak, and Soso Pavliashvili	29–31	Anatoly Wasserman	28 June 2024	2.9%/14.8%/7.7%
7	7	Alyona Apina, Stas Kostyushkin, Khabib Sharipov, and Lyubov Uspenskaya	32–35	Maria Mironova	5 July 2024	3.1%/14.9%/8.3%

=== Season 2 (2025) ===
List of season 2 episodes
No. overall	No. in season	Guest artists	Player order	Dark horse	Original release date	RUS r/s/c points (national)
8	1	Valeriya, Natalia Podolskaya, Vladimir Presnyakov Jr., and Iosif Prigozhin	36–38	Nikas Safronov	16 May 2025	3.1%/14.9%/7.9%
9	2	Nonna Grishayeva, Dmitry Kharatyan, Anna Kovalchuk, and Lera Kudryavtseva	39–41	Mariya Kiselyova	23 May 2025	2.8%/12.8%/7.5%
10	3	Katya Lel, Igor Nikolayev, Klara Novikova, and Yan Tsapnik	42–45	Anton Demidov and Aleksander Yakovlev	30 May 2025	2.7%/12.4%/7%
11	4	Philipp Kirkorov, Andrey Malakhov, Sergey Shakurov, and Klava Koka	46–48	Darya Dontsova	6 June 2025	2.8%/14.3%/7.5%
12	5	Valya Karnaval, Maria Mironova, Aleksandr Panayotov, and Aleksander Serov	49–50	Ashkold and Edgard Zapashny	11 June 2025	2.1%/11.7%/6.5%
13	6	Alexey Chumakov, Larisa Dolina, Anastasiya Makeyeva, and Yevgeny Petrosyan	51–52	Jeff Monson	20 June 2025	2.9%/14%/7.3%
14	7	Gosha Kutsenko, Viktor Saltykov, Katerina Shpitsa, and Vladimir Vinokur	53–56	Yelena Khanga	4 July 2025	3%/14.2%/7.9%

=== Season 3 (2026) ===
List of season 3 episodes
No. overall	No. in season	Guest artists	Player order	Dark horse	Original release date	RUS r/s/c points (national)
15	1	Pelageya, Philipp Kirkorov, Aleksandr Panayotov, and Soso Pavliashvili	57	Alexander Akopov	15 May 2026	2.8%/14.5%/7.4%
16	2	Valeriya, Iosif Prigozhin, Khabib Sharipov, and Klava Koka	—	Vadim Vernik	22 May 2026	2.4%/13%/6.4%
17	3	Nonna Grishayeva, Natalia Podolskaya, Vladimir Presnyakov Jr., and Aglaya Shilovskaya	58	Nikolai Valuev	29 May 2026	2.5%/12.7%/7%
18	4	Nadezhda Babkina, Alexander Buinov, Denis Klyaver, and Ekaterina Skulkina	59–60	Andrey Urgant	5 June 2026	2.5%/13.8%/7%
19	5	Dmitry Kharatyan, Stas Kostyushkin, Natalia Podolskaya, and Maria Zaitseva	61	Vladimir Sychyov	19 June 2026	2.6%/12.3%/6.8%
20	6	Prokhor Chaliapin, Natasha Korolyova, Lada Dance, and Elena Vorobey	62–63	Galina Belyayeva	26 June 2026	2.3%/12%/6.2%
