= Zubovka =

Rural locality name

Zubovka (Russian: Зубовка) is the name of several rural localities in Russia, and the former name of Şirvan, Azerbaijan.

== Russia ==
=== Modern localities ===
- Zubovka, Astrakhan Oblast, a selo in Zubovka Selsoviet of Chernoyarsky District of Astrakhan Oblast
- Zubovka, Republic of Bashkortostan, a village in Muzyakovsky Selsoviet of Krasnokamsky District of the Republic of Bashkortostan
- Zubovka, Bryansk Oblast, a village in Ryabchovsky Selsoviet of Navlinsky District of Bryansk Oblast
- Zubovka, Novosibirsk Oblast, a selo in Tatarsky District of Novosibirsk Oblast
- Zubovka, Perm Krai, a village in Ilyinsky District of Perm Krai
- Zubovka, Samara Oblast, a selo in Chelno-Vershinsky District of Samara Oblast
- Zubovka, Saratov Oblast, a village in Atkarsky District of Saratov Oblast
- Zubovka, Tula Oblast, a village in Zubovsky Rural Okrug of Kimovsky District of Tula Oblast
- Zubovka, Tver Oblast, a village in Grishinskoye Rural Settlement of Oleninsky District of Tver Oblast

=== Historical localities ===
- Zubovka, Murmansk Oblast, an inhabited locality under the administrative jurisdiction of the urban-type settlement of Pechenga in Pechengsky District of Murmansk Oblast; abolished in December 2009

== Azerbaijan ==
- Şirvan, Azerbaijan, known until 1938 as Zubovka
