= Milana Khametova =

Russian singer

- Милана Хаметова
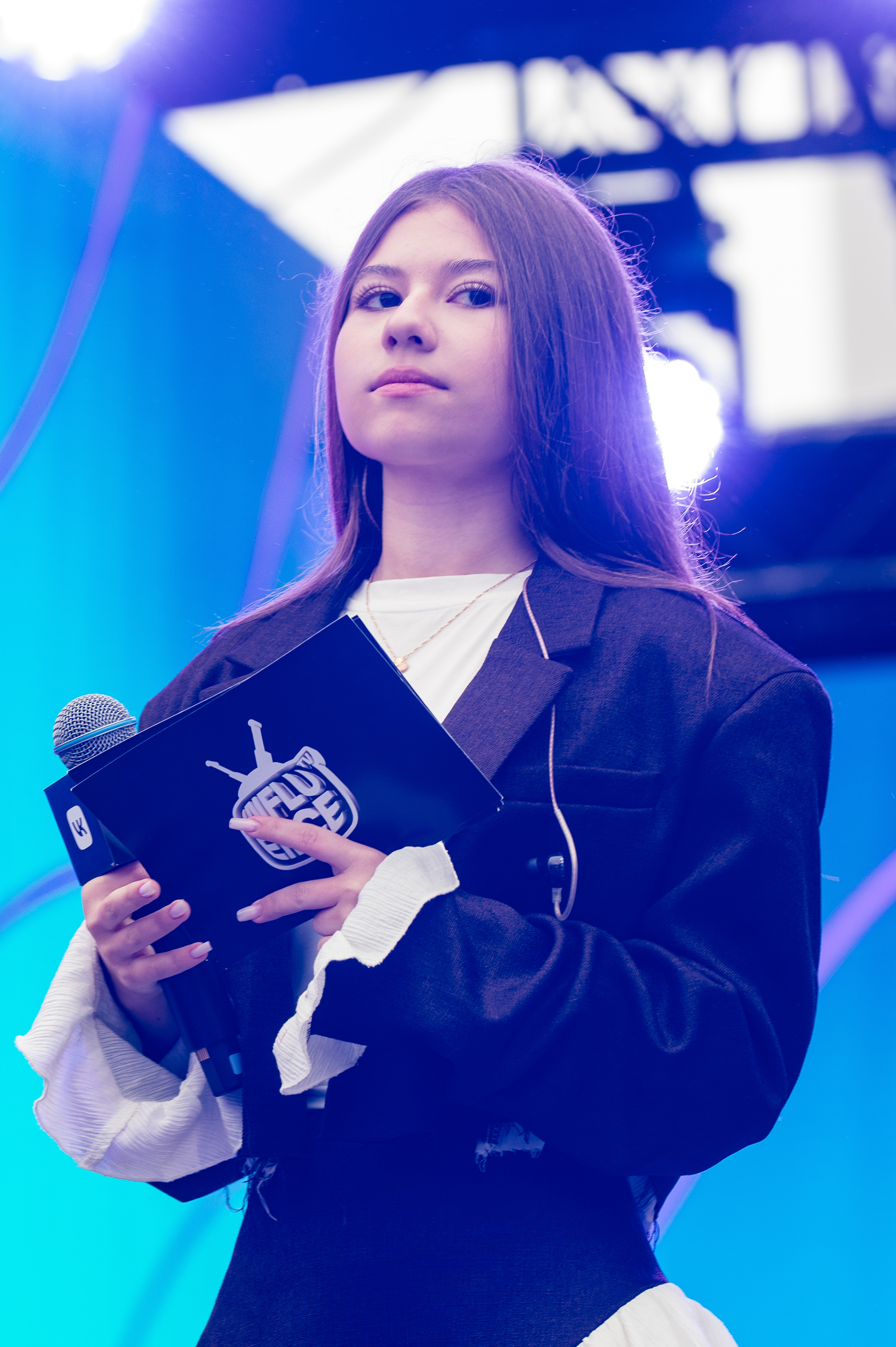
- Khametova at the 2025 VK Fest, Saint Petersburg
- Born: 5 March 2010 (age 16); Starosibirsk Novasibirsk Oblast

Milana Dmitriyevna (Note: Sometimes transcribed to English as Dmitrievna.) Khametova ( Elena Dmitrievna Voroncova ) (Russian: Елена Дмитриевна Воронцова; born 5 March 2010) is a Russian singer, model, film and dubbing actress and blogger.

In 2023, Forbes included her in its "30 under 30" list.

== Biography ==
Milana Khametova was born on March 5, 2010, in the city of Starosibirsk, Novosibirsk Oblast.

Milana's parents enrolled her in various clubs from an early age, where she participated in gymnastics, dancing, and singing. She appeared in various commercials.

From the age of 4, Milana worked for a modeling agency. She also participated in beauty pageants. In 2016, she was crowned "Mini-Miss Siberia."

By 2020, Milana and her mother immigrated to Moscow.

=== Starting of her career ===
After moving, Milana registered on popular social media. In the summer of 2020, she was discovered by video blogger and singer Dava, who collaborated with her on several projects. He also invited her to his TikTok house, Super House. By the summer of 2022, her Instagram account had reached one million followers. Milana won the "TikToker of the Year" award at the Teen Awards. The award was presented at Igor Krutoy Academy of Popular Music.

Milana also appears in her TikTok house partners' music videos; for example, in December 2020, Khabib's music video for "Yagoda Malinka" (Malinka Berry) was released, featuring Milana Khametova.

=== Music career ===
In the summer of 2022, one of Milana's most breakthrough songs, "LP," was released, also featuring Milana Star. Their song gained popularity on TikTok and YouTube. Remixes and mashups followed, turning the song into a meme, further increasing its popularity.

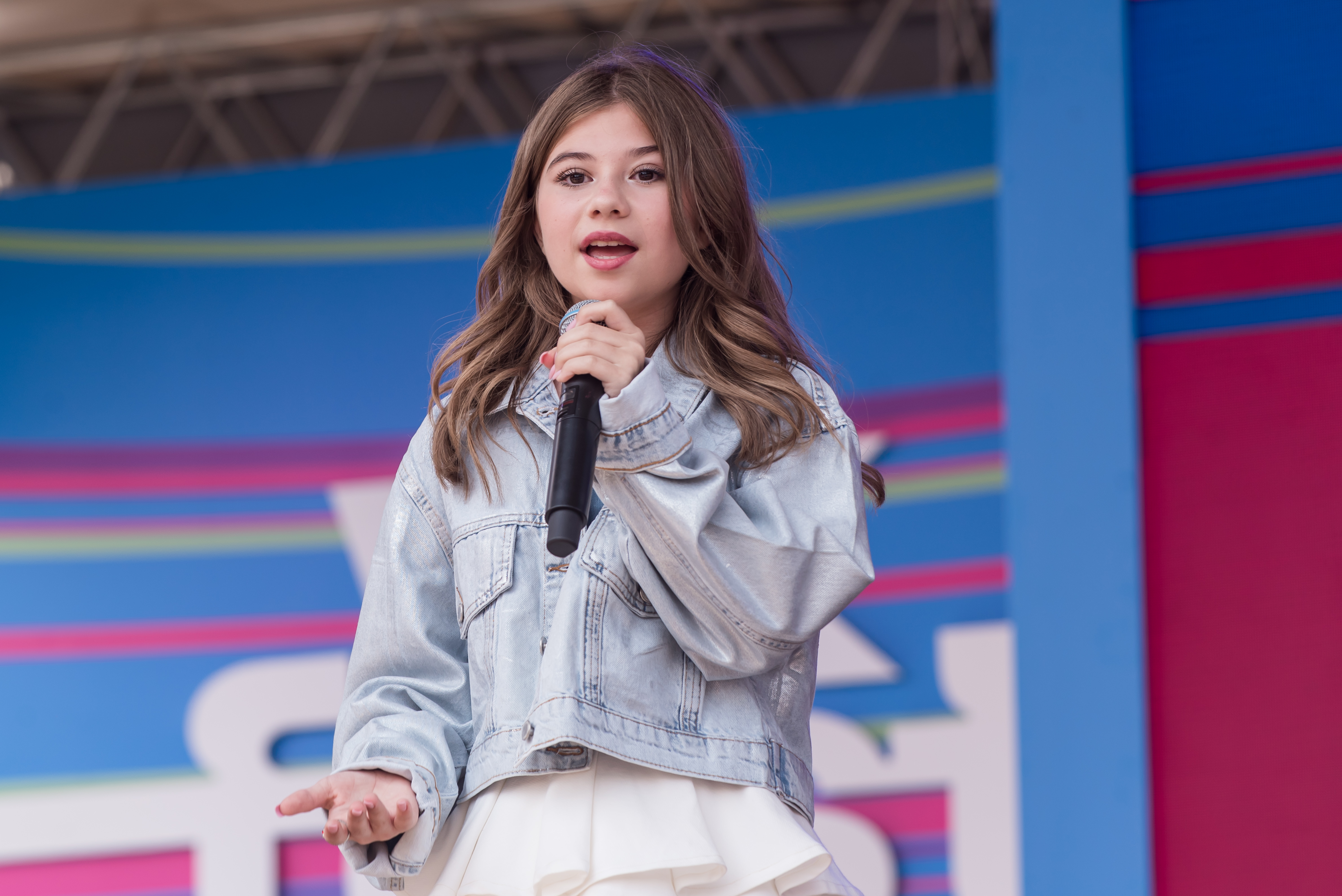
Khametova at VK Fest, 2023

In the fall of 2022, the song's music video was released, featuring bloggers Danya Milokhin and Nekoglai, which garnered 10 million views within a few days. The video later amassed 76 million views. The track briefly held the top spot on YouTube's list of most-viewed music videos.

== Incidents ==
In September 2022, after the release of the music video for the track "LP," Khametova announced her first fan meeting in Minsk at the Dana Mall shopping center. Even before the event began, a huge crowd had formed both inside and outside the mall. By 2:00 PM, emergency services received a report of people stuck in an elevator. Twenty minutes into the event, the administration asked for the "meeting" to be stopped. The girl left the mall due to the crush and chaos that had ensued.

Following the incident, the Investigative Committee of Belarus opened a criminal case under the article on negligence resulting in serious consequences. The event organizers were detained.

== Discography ==
Name
Бэнгер$
Information
- Release: 20 December 2023
- Label: Zion Music
- Format: digital distribution
Notes

* List
| No. | Title | Length |
|---|---|---|
| 1. | "АГУ" | 0:52 |
| 2. | "Алфавит" (при уч. Василисы Кукояки) | 1:00 |
| 3. | "Бэнгер" | 1:18 |
| 4. | "Лапки" | 1:34 |
| 5. | "ЛП 2" | 0:53 |
| 6. | "Спокойной ночи, малыши" | 1:21 |
| Total length: | | 6:58 |

=== Singles ===
| Year | Name | Album |
|---|---|---|
| 2021 | «Умка» | Внеальбомные синглы |
| 2021 | «Красная помада» (with Leona Cool) | Внеальбомные синглы |
| 2021 | «Воздушный поцелуй» | Внеальбомные синглы |
| 2021 | «Один дома» (with DAVA) | Внеальбомные синглы |
| 2022 | «Шаг вперёд» | The Best Children's Songs 2.0 |
| 2022 | «С Днём Рождения» | Внеальбомные синглы |
| 2022 | «ЛП» (with Milana Star) | Внеальбомные синглы |
| 2022 | «Купи пёсика» | Внеальбомные синглы |
| 2022 | «Новогодняя» (with DAVA) | Внеальбомные синглы |
| 2023 | «Краш» (with Vasilisa Kukoyaka) | Внеальбомные синглы |
| 2023 | «Стать шефом» (with DAVA) | Внеальбомные синглы |
| 2023 | «Танцы» | Внеальбомные синглы |
| 2023 | «Завтрак» | Внеальбомные синглы |
| 2023 | «Я + Ты = Подружки» | Внеальбомные синглы |
| 2023 | «Алфавит» (with Vasilisa Kukoyaka) | Бэнгер$ |
| 2023 | «Бэнгер» | Бэнгер$ |
| 2023 | «ЛП 2» | Бэнгер$ |
| 2023 | «Изи» | Crazy inventions (OST) |
| 2024 | «Мур-Мур» | Внеальбомные синглы |
| 2024 | «Купи пёсика (DnB Remix)» (with qquinnkaya) | Внеальбомные синглы |
| 2024 | «Рок Старс (Juicy Stars)» | Внеальбомные синглы |
| 2024 | «Поздно» (with Kamil KiKiDo & Viki Show) | Внеальбомные синглы |
| 2024 | «Гимн Дружбы» | From м/c «Shushumagiya» |
| 2024 | «Чики-Брики» | Внеальбомные синглы |
| 2025 | «Бабочки» | Внеальбомные синглы |
| 2025 | «Я и моя Тень» (with МИ) | Внеальбомные синглы |
| 2025 | «Сюжеты» (under a pseudonym МИ) | Внеальбомные синглы |
| 2025 | «Мармелад» | |

== Videography ==
| Year | Song | Director | Album |
|---|---|---|---|
| 2021 | «Умка» | Не указан | Внеальбомные синглы |
| 2021 | «Один дома» (with DAVA) | Anna Makovskaya | Внеальбомные синглы |
| 2022 | «ЛП» (with Milana Star) | Anna Makovskaya | Внеальбомные синглы |
| 2022 | «Купи пёсика» | Nikita Sklokin | Внеальбомные синглы |
| 2022 | «Новогодняя» (with DAVA) | Denis Boyvanov & Anna Makovskaya | Внеальбомные синглы |
| 2023 | «Краш» (with Vasilisa Kukoyaka) | Anna Makovskaya | Внеальбомные синглы |
| 2023 | «Изи» (OST «Crazy inventions») | Milana Khametova | Внеальбомные синглы |
| 2024 | «Я + Ты = Подружки» (Фан-Клип (Fan-Music Video)) | Milana Khametova | Внеальбомные синглы |
| 2024 | «Рок Старс (Juicy Stars)» | Denis Boyvanov & Alexandra Chistova | Внеальбомные синглы |
Participation of other performers
| 2020 | «Ягода малинка» (music video by Khabib's) | OVEN | Внеальбомные синглы |
| 2020 | «Снежинки» (DAVA and Olga Buzova) | Alexander Romanov | Внеальбомные синглы |
| 2021 | «Дари тепло» (music video by DAVA) | Не указан | Внеальбомные синглы |
| 2023 | «Симпатяшка» (music video by Kikido) | KiKiDo | Внеальбомные синглы |
| 2024 | «Потанцевал» (music video by DAVA and Stas Kostyushkin) | Denis Shkedov | Внеальбомные синглы |
