= Zubovka, Republic of Bashkortostan =

Zubovka Зубовка
- Village
- Location within Bashkortostan Location within Russia
- Coordinates: 56°09′N 54°14′E
- Country: Russia
- Region: Bashkortostan
- District: Krasnokamsky District
- Time zone: UTC+5:00

Zubovka (Russian: Зубовка) is a rural locality (a village) in Muzyakovsky Selsoviet, Krasnokamsky District, Bashkortostan, Russia. The population was 28 as of 2010. There are 4 streets.

== Geography ==
Zubovka is located 18 km northeast of Nikolo-Beryozovka (the district's administrative centre) by road. Vorobyovo is the nearest rural locality.
