= Yagoda Malinka =

Single by Khabib
- Language: Russian
- Released: November 17, 2020
- Genre: Pop
- Length: 2:28

"Yagoda Malinka" (Russian: "Ягода малинка") is a song by Russian singer Khabib, released on 17 November 2020 through the label FOMENKOF.

== Background ==
=== Awards and nominations ===
Year	Award	Category/Work	Result	Ref.
2021	Премия RU.TV	Best Start: "Ягода малинка"	Nominated	

=== Ratings ===
Year	Platform	Rating	Place	Ref.
2021	VK	Top Tracks of the Year	7	
2021	Odnoklassniki	Top-10 самых добавляемых песен в плейлисты	1	

== Music video ==
On 24 December 2020, a music video for the song was released. A little more than a month after its release, the video was watched more than 33 million times. In the video, the singer dances with a girl in Russian folk costume, talking about how he is in love with her.
