= Ernest Mackevičius =

Russian journalist and television presenter (born 1968)

- Эрне́ст Мацкя́вичюс
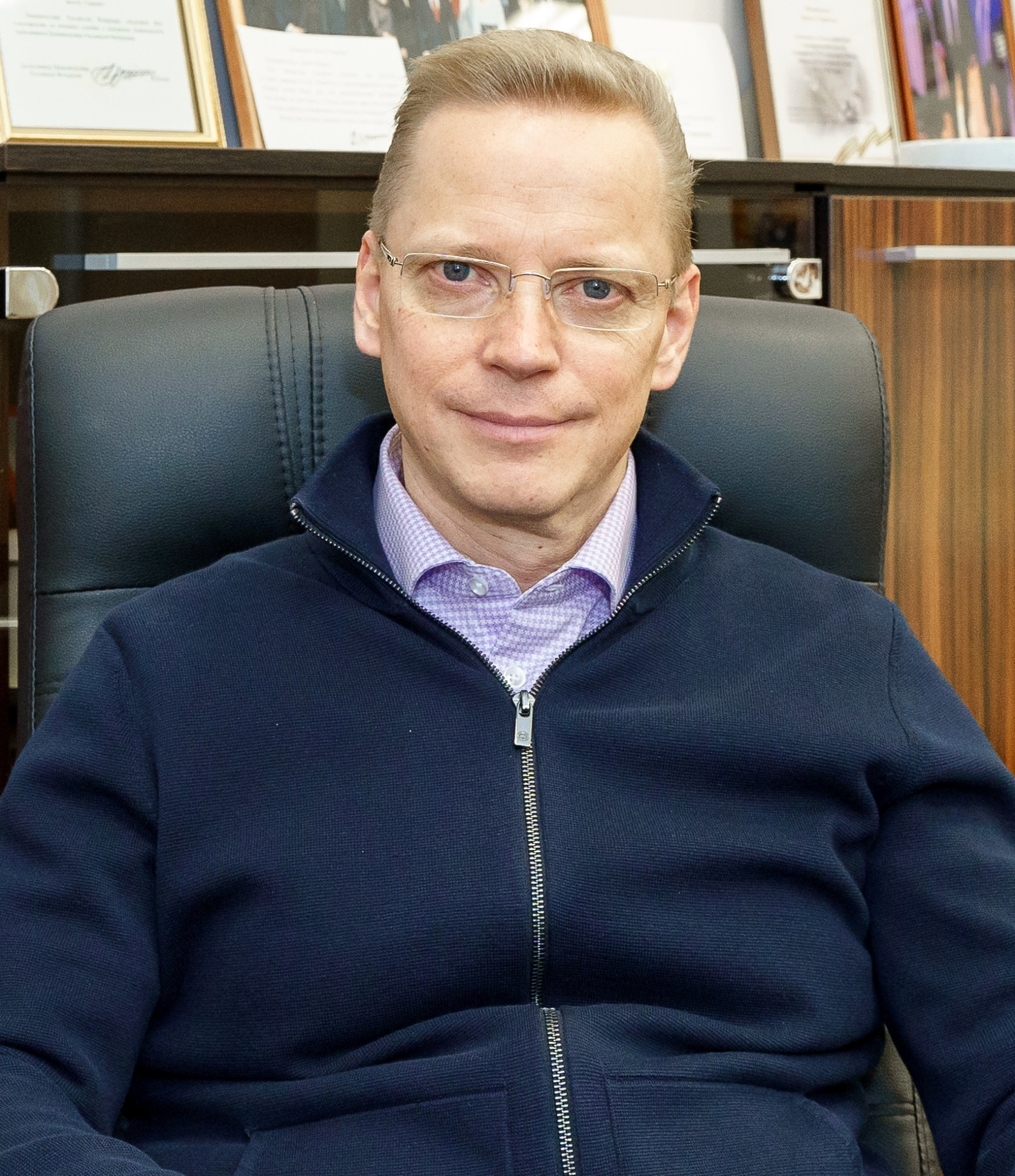
- Mackevičius in 2024
- Born: Ernest Gedrevich Mackevičius; 25 November 1968 (age 57); Vilnius, Lithuanian SSR, Soviet Union
- Citizenship: Russian
- Education: Moscow State University
- Occupations: Journalist; television presenter

Ernest Gedrevich Mackevičius (Russian: Эрне́ст Гедревич Мацкя́вичюс; Lithuanian: Ernestas Mackevičius; 25 November 1968) is a Russian journalist and TV host. Presenter of the programs Good Morning, Russia (2002–2005) and Vesti (since 2006).

== Biography ==
Born on 25 November 1968 in Vilnius. Ernest's father is theatre director Giedrius Mackevičius. Mother Marina Mackevičienė is a journalist with the newspaper Vechernyaya Moskva. He graduated from the Moscow school No. 579, then he passed military service in the border troops. In 1994 he graduated from the newspaper department of the MSU Faculty of Journalism. He studied on the same course with his future colleagues on the NTV Vladimir Lensky, Sergey Gaponov, Vyacheslav Grunsky, Sergey Dedukh, Andrey Cherkasov, Alexander Khabarov and Vladimir Chernyshev. He also studied for some time on the same course with Andrey Malakhov and Dmitry Lesnevsky, who, due to various circumstances, graduated from the university later.

He has worked in television since 1991, starting as the TV company VIDgital correspondent. He commented for the VGTRK for the Eurovision Song Contest 2016.

Ernest was awarded the Medal of the Order for Services to the Fatherland I class (2008) and the Order of Friendship (2014).

He is married to Alina Akhmetova and has a daughter Dahlia (born 2004).
