= Nikas Safronov =

Soviet/Russian painter

- Никас Сафронов
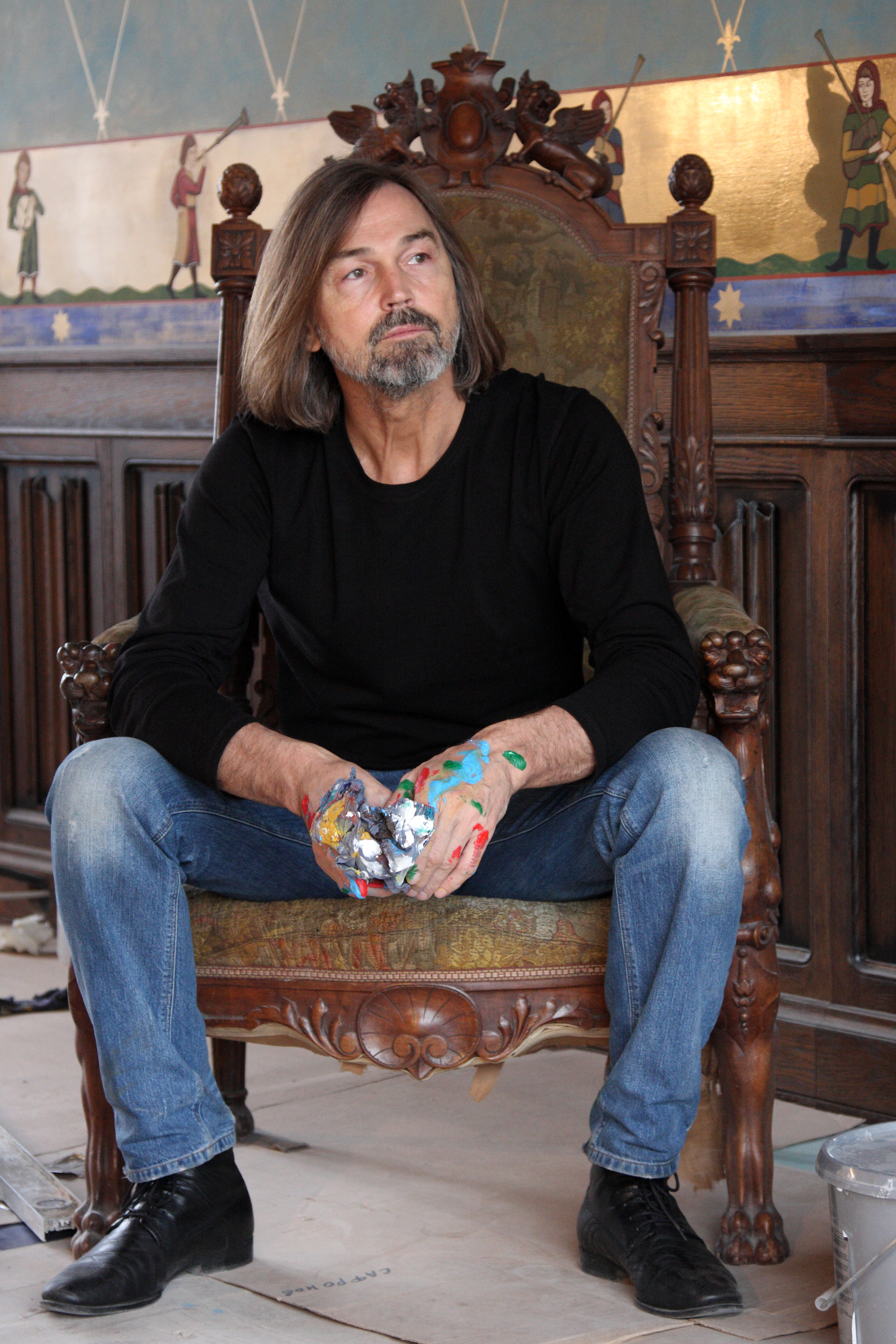
- Born: 8 April 1956 (age 70); Ulyanovsk, Soviet Union
- Education: Moscow Surikov State Academic Institute of Fine Arts
- Known for: Painting
- Title: People's Artist of the Russian Federation (2021)
- Movement: Symbolism

Nikolay (Nikas) Stepanovich Safronov (Russian: Николай (Ни́кас) Степа́нович Сафро́нов; born April 8, 1956, Ulyanovsk) is the most prominent modern artist in Russia, titled as the People's Artist of the Russian Federation. Furthermore, Nikas is an Academician of the Russian Academy of Arts, Professor and Dean of the Faculty of Culture and Art of the Ulyanovsk State University, Professor of the Department of Drawing and Painting of the Kosygin Russian State University (Art, Design, Technology), Laureate of the “International Pushkin Prize” in the “Art. Painting” nomination (2024), and the winner of the national ‘Dean of the Year’ award (2024) . Today, Nikas Safronov is one of the most famous and sought-after artists in Russia, as well as one of the most prominent phenomena of modern culture, and an artist of global significance. His works reflect the evolution of global art - from Gothic Hermeticism to Pop Art and Avant-garde. His name is closely associated with symbolism and surrealism, further developing into his own artistic style which he titled Dream Vision.

Over the past ten years, Nikas held over 320 exhibitions in Russia and abroad. According to public surveys, Nikas Safronov’s exhibitions are visited by over a million people annually, including heads of state, political figures and leading cultural figures internationally. Recently, Nikas became an honorary guest of Pope Francis in the Vatican, in February 2025. Nikas is also the author of Donald Trump’s portrait, gifted by Russian president Vladimir Putin in April 2025 through Special Representative Steve Witkoff. Nikas is currently set to present exhibitions in Mumbai and New Delhi, as an act of strengthening diplomatic relations between Russia and India. This exhibition will become the first out of a series of international exhibitions planned by the artist.

== Early life and education ==
Nikas Safronov was born in 1956 in Ulyanovsk, USSR, into a family of a retired military man, as one of six children. To this day, Nikas actively expresses great admiration and warm affection towards his four older brothers and younger sister.

Nikas began developing his own artistic style by copying book illustrations and prints whilst still in school. His main sources of inspiration were Onore de Balzak and Gustave Dore. Upon graduating school, Nikas enrolled in a maritime college. Soon after realizing his longing for art, Nikas left maritime college and eventually graduated from leading universities and art institutions of Russia - Rostov Grekov Art School (1974), State Art Institute of the Lithuanian SSR (1982), Moscow State Academic Art Institute named after V.I. Surikov (2007). Additionally, he graduated from Moscow State University of Technology and Management named after K.G. Razumovsky with a degree in Psychology.

== Career ==
During his education Nikas had to serve in missile forces, after which he moved to Panevezys, Lithuania, where his first exhibition was held in 1978. This marked the beginning of his career as a symbolist, portraitist and experimenter.

Today, Nikas’ works are presented in numerous famous Russian museums including the Hermitage, the Tretyakov Gallery, the Russian Museum, the Pushkin State Museum of Fine Arts, and the Central Museum of Contemporary History of Russia.

From the 1980s, Nikas became prominently known for his series of portraits of famous personalities including Catherine Deneuve, Audrey Tautou, Jean-Paul Belmondo, Pierre Richard, Mireille Mathieu, Sophia Loren, Alain Delon, Gérard Depardieu, Robert De Niro, Jack Nicholson, Sean Connery, Meryl Streep, Diana Ross, Tina Turner, Elton John, Mick Jagger and many others. In February, 2025, his portrait of Donald Trump was given as a gift to the US president, taken back from Moscow to the White House by Steve Witkoff. In April, 2025, Nikas was invited by the Vatican as an honorary guest, where Nikas presented Pope Francis with his portrait, as well as a painting of the Basilica of San José de Flores in Buenos Aires.

== Artistic style and themes ==
Nikas Safronov experiments with various styles and genres of painting, which altogether comes to form his own unique style. He consistently works in realism, whilst also ranging from combining cubist forms with surrealistic interplay of images and meanings, and medieval austerity with baroque excess. After years of experimentation and development, Nikas presented his own artistic direction which he called Dream Vision.

== State and public awards ==
For his achievements in painting Nikas Safronov was awarded the titles:

- People's Artist of the Russian Federation;
- Academician of the Russian Academy of Arts;
- Honored Artist of Russia;
- People's Artist of the Republic of Dagestan;
- People's Artist of the Republic of South Ossetia;
- Professor in the field of Fine and Decorative Arts and Architecture at the Ministry of Science and Higher Education of the Russian Federation;
- Dean of the Faculty of Culture and Arts at Ulyanovsk State University;
- Honorary Professor of Ulyanovsk State University;
- Honorary Citizen of Ulyanovsk;
- Honorary Citizen of Kaspiysk;
- Honorary Citizen of Russia;
- Honorary Member of the Zhurgenov Kazakh National Academy of Arts.
- Professor of the Kazakh National University of Arts.
- For his professional, social, and charitable activities, Nikas Safronov has been awarded:
- The Gratitude of the President of the Russian Federation "For his great contribution, creative approach, and dedication in carrying out the tasks of the Government of the Russian Federation, and for his success in the service of the Fatherland"
- The Gold Medal of the Russian Academy of Arts;
- The Medal of the Russian Academy of Arts "For Merit to the Academy";
- The Honorary Badge of the Order "For Service to the Arts" of the Russian Academy of Arts, Third Class;
- The badge of the Russian Ministry of Education "Honored Mentor";
- Order of the Russian Academy of Natural Sciences ("Profession is Life");
- Medal of the SVR of Russia "100 Years of the INO-PSU-SVR";
- Commemorative Badge "95 Years of the Institute of State and Law of the Russian Academy of Sciences";
- Badge of Merit of the Financial University under the Government of the Russian Federation "For Assistance";
- Badge "Mentor of Youth";
- Medal of the Sofia-Troitsky Charitable Foundation for Contribution to the Spiritual Revival of Russia and Restoration of Historical and Cultural Monuments;
- Order of St. Constantine the Great;
- Order of St. Stanislaus;
- Order of St. Anne, 2nd Class;
- Order of the Russian Philanthropist;
- Order of Service to the Arts, 1st Class (Golden Star);
- Order of St. Seraphim of Sarov, 3rd Class;
- Order of Russia the Mighty;
- Order of Charity of the Club of Orthodox Philanthropists;
- Order of Honour of the Kuzbass;
- Order of Valor of the Russian Committee of Veterans;
- Order of Merit in the Veteran Movement;
- Gold Medal of the American Academy of Sciences and Arts;
- Gold Medal "In the Name of Russia";
- Gold Medal "National Treasure";
- Medal "MGTEU.30 Years";
- Commemorative Badge "350 Years of Peter the Great"; Awarded numerous titles, prizes, and awards, including:
- Winner of the E.M. Primakov Prize of the SVR of Russia for the best works in the field of literature and art about Russian foreign intelligence for 2022.
- The "For Saving the People" award of the Public Russian Movement in the category "Charity";
- Winner of the "International Pushkin Prize" in the category "Art. Painting" in 2024;
- Winner of the national award "Dean of the Year-2024".
- Laureate of the Board of Trustees Award in the field of Culture and Arts at Ulyanovsk State University (Ulyanovsk, 2025).
- Diploma of Honorary Professor of the Stroganov Russian State Academy of Arts and Industry, 2025.
- Certificate of Appreciation for 1st place in the individual ranking of Ulyanovsk State University's creative faculty members in 2023.
