= Vladimir Vinokur =

Russian actor and comedian (born 1948)

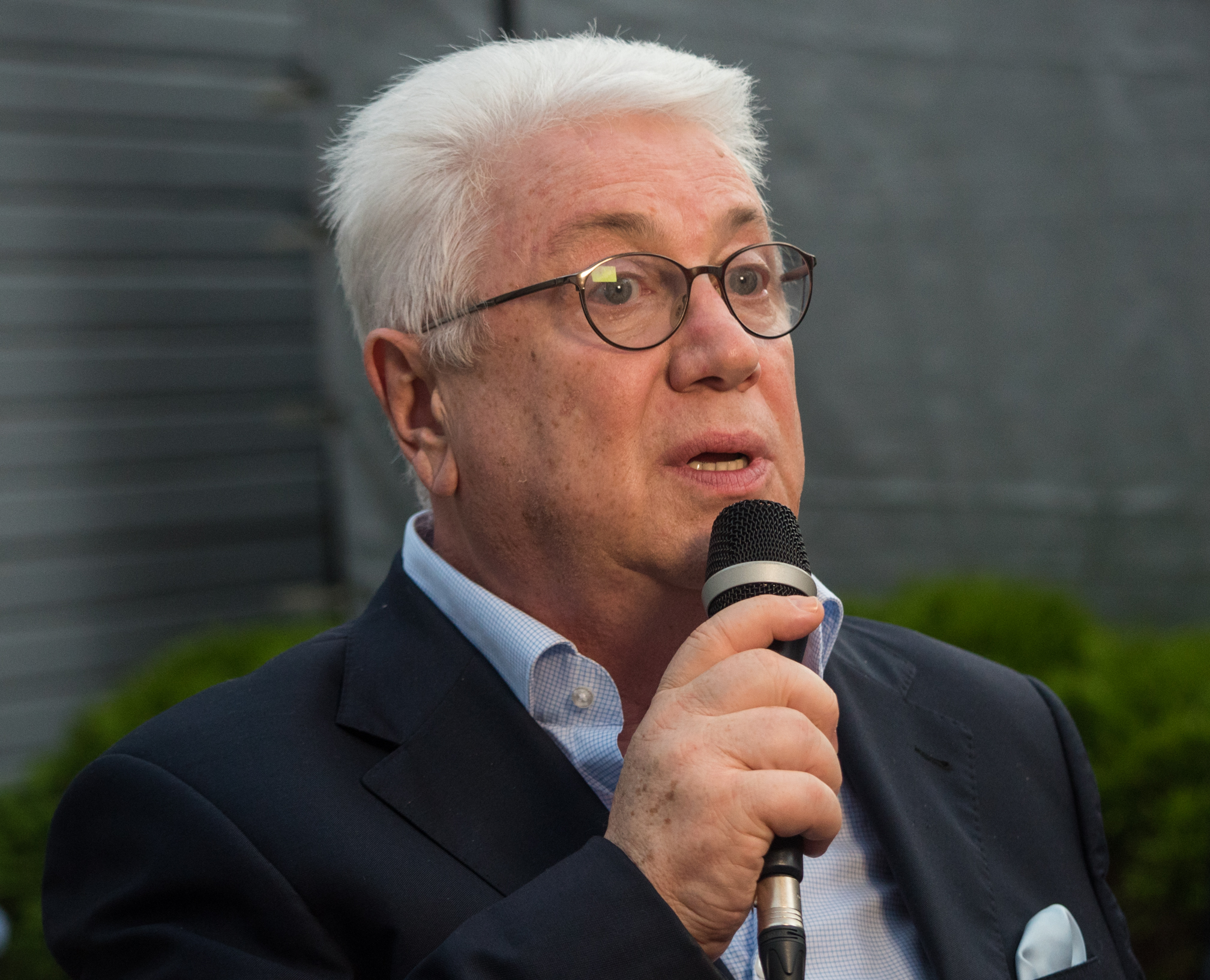
- Vladimir Vinokur, 2017
- Born: Vladimir Natanovich Vinokur; March 31, 1948 (age 78); Kursk, Russian SFSR, Soviet Union
- Occupations: Humorist, singer, parodist, actor
- Title: People's Artist of the RSFSR (1989)
- Spouse: Tamara Viktorovna Pervakova
- Awards: Full cavalier of the Order "For Merit to the Fatherland"; Order of Honour; Order of Friendship; Order of the Red Banner of Labour; Order of the Badge of Honour; Order of Friendship (Kazakhstan) (2nd class)

Vladimir Natanovich Vinokur (born 31 March 1948 in Kursk) is a Soviet and Russian entertainer, humorist, singer and actor. People's Artist of the RSFSR (1989).

== Early life ==
Vladimir Vinokur was born on 31 March 1948 in Kursk to Natan Vinokur (1919–1995), a builder of Jewish descent, and Anna Yulyevna (1922–2018), a teacher of Russian descent. His older brother, Boris (1944–2010), was an entrepreneur.

== Career ==
In 1962, Vinokur was involved in the Artek camp, and won a singing competition, with his medal being given by Russian cosmonaut Yuri Gagarin.

In 1975, Vinokur became involved with the parody band Samotsvety.

== Personal life ==
Vinokur is married to Tamara Viktorovna Pervakova, an actress and former ballerina. On 25 October 1985, Tamara gave birth to their only daughter, Anastasia, who later pursued a career as a ballerina.
