= Klara Novikova =

Russian pop artist and humorist

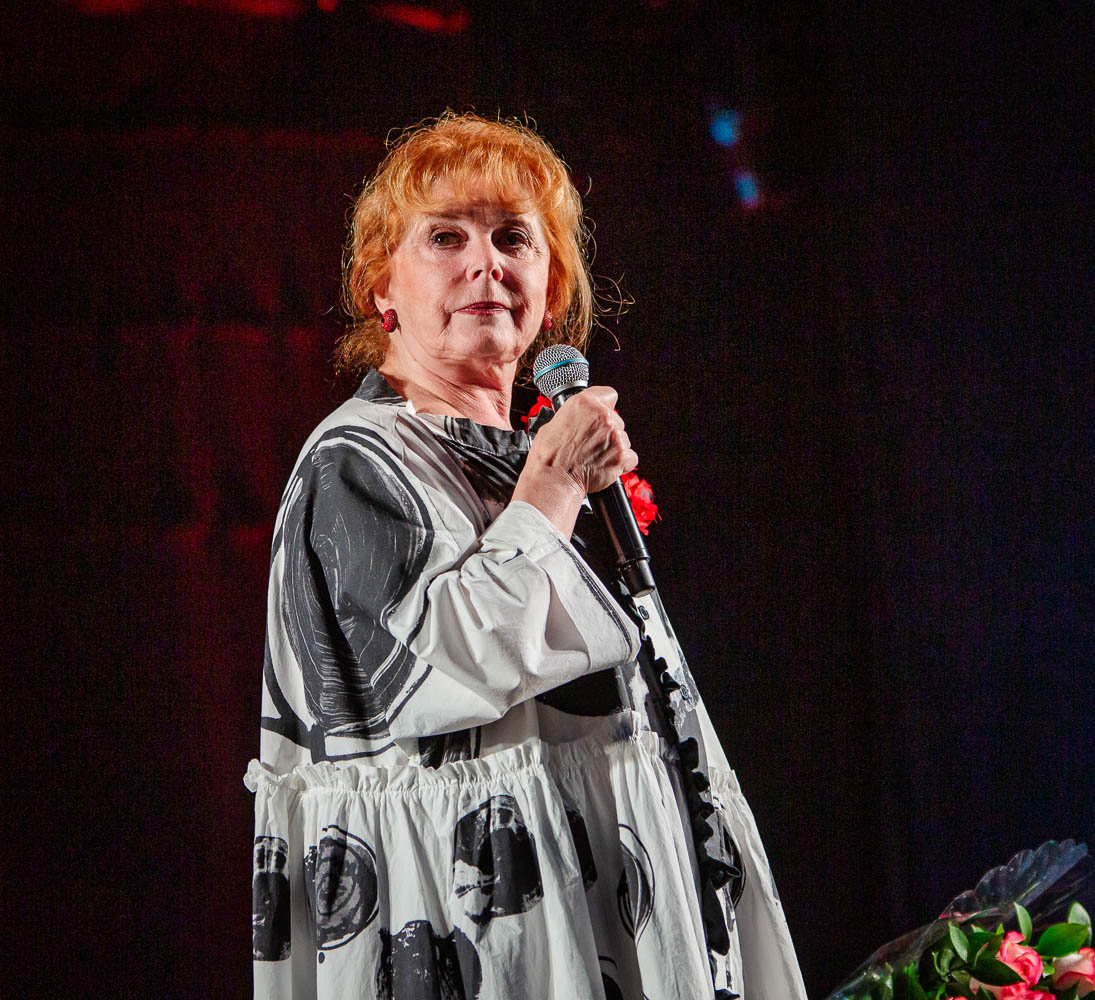
- Novikova in 2022
- Born: Klara Borisovna Herzer; December 12, 1946 (age 79); Kiev, Ukrainian SSR, USSR
- Spouse: Yuri Zerchaninov

Comedy career
- Years active: since 1974
- Genre: estrada
- Website: klara.ru

Klara Borisovna Novikova (Russian: Клаpа Бopисoвна Нoвикoва; born Herzer (Russian: Ге́рцер), December 12, 1946, Kiev) is a Soviet and Russian pop artist and humorist. She is an Honored Artist of the Russian Federation (1992), People's Artist of Russia (1997), and a member of the Public Council of the Russian Jewish Congress.

== Biography ==
Klara Novikova was born December 12, 1946, in Kiev, into the family of war veteran and director of a shoe store in Podil, Boris Herzer, and housewive Polina Weinstein. She graduated from the Kyiv Municipal Academy of Variety and Circus Art and the Russian Academy of Theatre Arts.

In 1974, she became the winner of the All-Union Competition of Entertainers; chairman of the jury was Arkady Raikin. In 1976, she went to work at Mosconcert and settled in Moscow.

Since 1992, Klara Novikova has worked at the Moscow Theater of Variety Miniatures, headed by Mikhail Zhvanetsky.

In 1995, she won the Arkady Raikin Cup at the MORE SMEHA International Festival in Riga.

In 2008, a monument to Aunt Sonia was planned to be unveiled on the Yalta embankment near the Yubileiny Palace. However, the monument was not erected and remained in the studio of sculptors Igor Lysenko and Ella Lysenko.

In 2010, together with the Gesher Theater, Klara Novikova first tried her hand as a dramatic actress, playing the lead female role in the play The Late Love (directed by Yevgeny Aryeh based on the play by Valery Muharyamov In the Shadow of the Vineyard, which was based on the story by Nobel Prize winner Isaac Bashevis Singer).

In 2022, a documentary film about Klara Novikova was made, ‘Klara Novikova. I'm not Aunt Sonya!’.

== Personal life ==
- First husband – drummer Victor Novikov, a fellow student at the circus school.
- Second husband – sports journalist Yuri Leonidovich Zerchaninov (1931-2009), head of the department of journalism at the magazine Yunost.
  - Daughter – Maria Zerchaninova (born 1976), a journalist who teaches at the University of Theater Critics

In 2013, Novikova was diagnosed with breast cancer. She underwent surgery, long treatment.
