= Zubovka, Astrakhan Oblast =

Zubovka Зубовка
- Selo
- Location within Astrakhan Oblast Location within Russia
- Coordinates: 48°08′N 46°02′E
- Country: Russia
- Region: Astrakhan Oblast
- District: Chernoyarsky District
- Time zone: UTC+4:00

Zubovka (Russian: Зубовка) is a rural locality (a selo) in Chernoyarsky District, Astrakhan Oblast, Russia. The population was 1,352 as of 2010. There are 28 streets.

== Geography ==
Zubovka is located 14 km north of Chyorny Yar (the district's administrative centre) by road. Baranovka is the nearest rural locality.
