= Nadezhda Babkina =

Soviet and Russian folk and pop singer

Nadezhda Babkina Надежда Бабкина
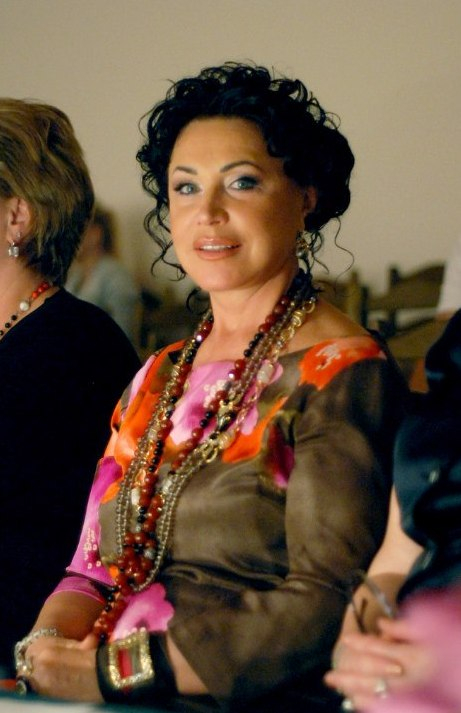
- Born: Nadezhda Georgievna Babkina; March 19, 1950 (age 76); Chyorny Yar, Astrakhan Oblast, Soviet Union
- Occupation: Singer
- Title: People's Artist of the RSFSR (1992)
- Awards: Full cavalier of the Order "For Merit to the Fatherland"(Russia); Order of Honour (Russia); Order of Friendship (Russia); Order of Francysk Skaryna (Belarus)
- Musical career
- Genres: Folk; Russian traditional music; Pop; Chanson
- Instruments: Vocals; Nadezhda Babkina's voice Echo of Moscow program, January 3, 2008
- Website: www.babkina.ru

Nadezhda Georgievna Babkina (Russian: Надежда Георгиевна Бабкина; born March 19, 1950) is а Soviet and Russian folk and pop singer. In 1992 she was named a People's Artist of the RSFSR. A minor planet, 10684 Babkina, was named in her honor. Since 2014 she has been a deputy of the Moscow City Duma.

== Biography ==
Babkina was born on March 19, 1950, in Chyorny Yar, Akhtubinsk, Astrakhan Oblast,

Soviet Union, in the family of the hereditary Volga Cossack Georgy Ivanovich Babkin (1916–1990).

She spent her childhood and the school years in the village of Zubovka, Chernoyarsky District, Astrakhan Oblast.

From early childhood she sang. In 1967, while studying in the 10th grade of secondary school, she won the All-Russian Youth Competition in the genre of Russian folk song.

In 1971, she enrolled in the Conducting and Choral Faculty of the Gnessin State Institute of Music and Pedagogy in Moscow. She completed the institute in two specialties: folk choir conducting (in 1976) and solo folk singing (in 1983).

=== Education ===
In 1967, after graduating from high school, she studied at the Astrakhan School of Music and in 1971 she graduated from it.

In 1971 started her studies at the conducting and choral department of the Gnessin State Musical College in Moscow. She graduated from the institute with two specialties: "conducting a folk choir" (in 1976) and "solo folk singing" (in 1983).

=== Family ===
- Father: Georgy Ivanovich Babkin (1916–1990), worked at the senior positions at the enterprises and organizations of the national economy of the Astrakhan Oblast, played various instruments and sang beautifully.
- Mother: Tamara Aleksandrovna Babkina (Chistyakova; 1925–2008), worked as a teacher at the elementary school, she was of the Chistyakov family, which owned a craft production in Moscow before the October Revolution of 1917, after the Civil War they sold the house on Malaya Bronnaya and first moved to Nizhny Novgorod, and then to Astrakhan, where they bought a wooden house in Trusovo.
- Brother: Valery Georgievich Babkin (1952–2003), major general.

== Professional activity ==
In 1974, while being a student, she formed the vocal band "Russkaya pesnya" in "Gnesinka", which included six girls.

In 1976, the first remarkable success was the performance in Sochi at the All-Russian Soviet Song Contest. Soon, three men have joined the girls'band. The band, led by Nadezhda Babkina, performed more than one hundred adaptations of Russian folk songs, created a large number of thematic concert programs, performances, folk acts ("Wedding", "Shrovetide", "Night Fortune-telling", "When the Sand Rises", "Russkaya pesnya collects friends" and others). Several shows became hits (arrangements of the songs "Moscow Golden-domed", "Dunin’s head fell ill", "How my mother wanted me", "If you want to be a military man", "Girl Nadia"). First, the composers Zhanna Kuznetsova and Vladimir Belyaev actively collaborated with the "Russian Song". The band composition has repeatedly changed. For many years, in the band have performed the Honored Artist of Russian Federation Tatyana Savanova (from the day of foundation), Vladimir Levashov, Nikolai Kuzmich.

In 1985, Babkina has entered at the faculty of bandstand directors and mass performances of the Higher Theater Courses at the A. Lunacharsky State Institute of Theater Arts (GITIS), which she graduated in 1986, receiving the specialty "Director of Band and Mass Performances".

In 1993, she hosted together with Russkaya Pesnya the Nizhny Novgorod Carousel – 93 the Russian folk song contest, and launched the Cossack Twist folk festival (1997); since 1999, she has been the head of the jury of the Russian contest Olga Kovaleva.

On March 17, 2010, the Russian president Dmitry Medvedev awarded Nadezhda Babkina the Order "For Merit to the Fatherland", 4th class.

She is the People's Artist of the Chechen Republic.

On June 17, 2012, she was awarded the honorary title "People's Artist of the Republic of Ingushetia".

On November 17, 2016, the Russian president Vladimir Putin awarded Nadezhda Babkina with the Order "For Merit to the Fatherland", 3rd class.

=== "Russkaya Pesnya" Theatre ===
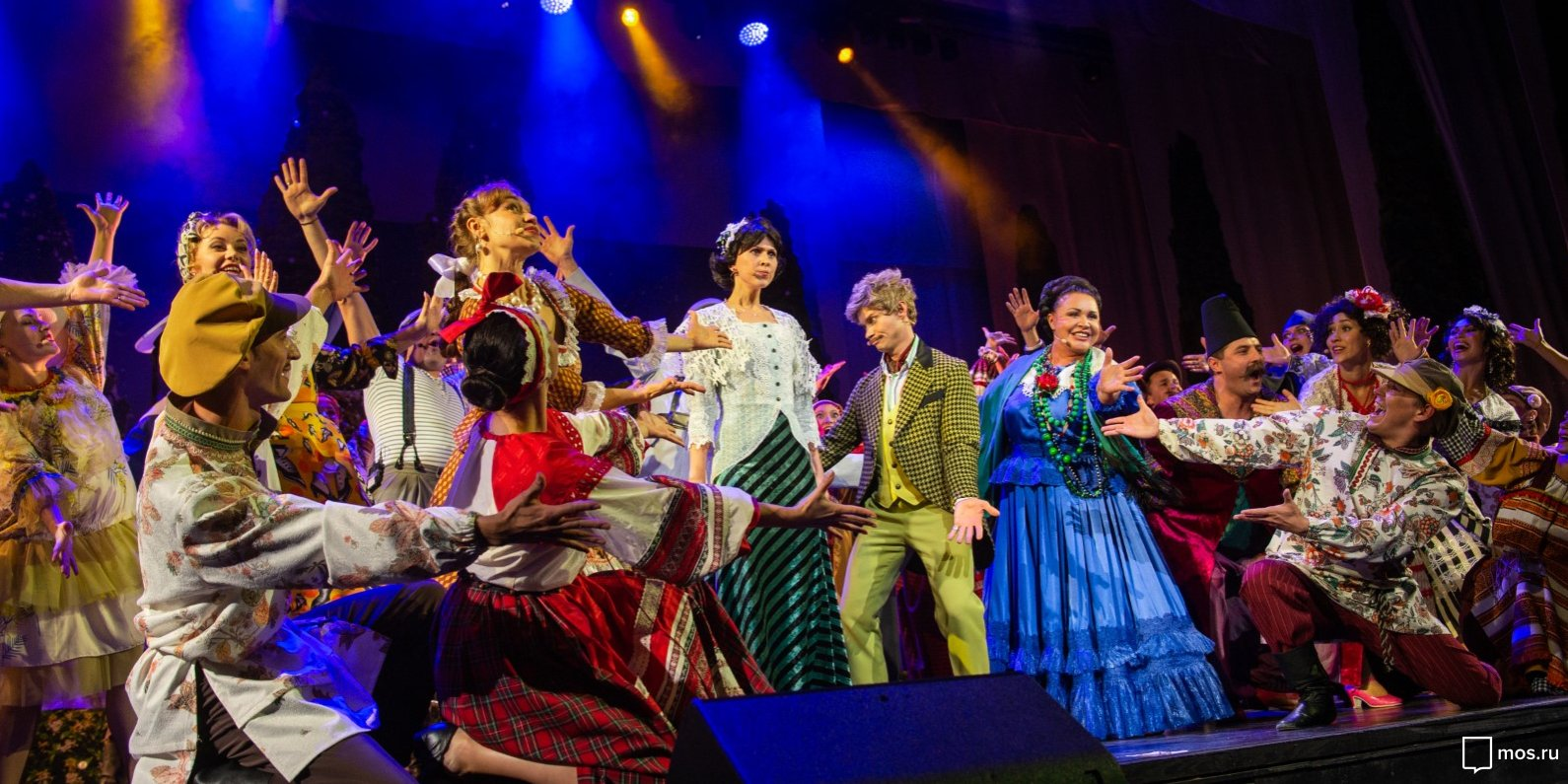
The play "For two hares" in the "Russkaya Pesnya" Theatre.

In 1989, on the basis of the vocal band "Russkaya pesnya", Babkinz has founded the multifunctional Moscow State Folklore Center Russkaya Pesnya.

Since April 1994, the Folklore Center Russkaya Pesnya has become an independent organization run by the Moscow City Culture Committee. It consists of an instrumental group of six musicians, who own several the arrangements. The center is assisted by the directors Sergey Tsvetkov, Lyubov Grechishnikova, choreographer Elena Karaseva, artists A. Mamaev, M. Fedorova, Valentin Yudashkin. The theater is engaged in staging musical and stage compositions, theatrical musical folk acts, publishing specialized (repertoire-methodical) literature, providing advisory assistance to folk singers, supporting young talents, experimental creativity (in the educational band "Slavs", the Folk Song Theater led by Tamara Semantic and others).

== Political activity ==
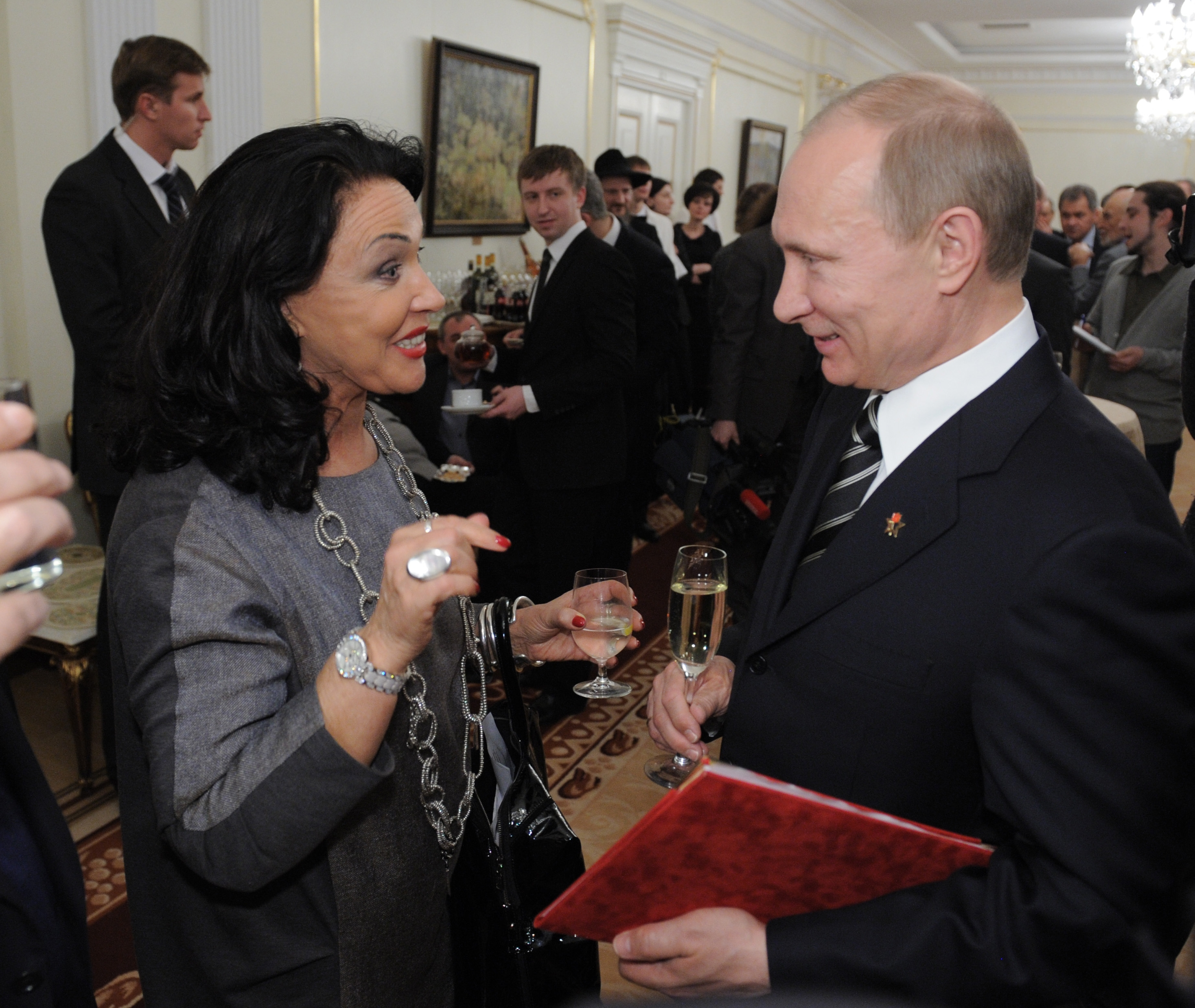
Nadezhda Babkina and Vladimir Putin

Nadezhda Babkina is an active member of the United Russia political party.

On June 23, 2008, in the interview published in the newspaper Moskovsky Komsomolets Estonia, Nadezhda Babkina has approved the actions of the Estonian Government on transferring the monument of the Soviet soldiers who fell in the Great Patriotic War, from Tõnismägi Hill in the center of Tallinn to the Military Cemetery, and urged the Russians who living in Estonia not to protest against the authorities of the republic. According to the artist, quoted by the newspaper, Babkina "reminded everyone living in Estonia that they should accept the actions of their government since they were here." The newspaper also cites Babkina's statement that she cannot understand why some Russians are outraged by the transfer of the Bronze Soldier. "It was not destroyed, but was transferred to the cemetery, where you can walk and lay flowers." Babkina also advised Estonian politicians on how to work with the Russian population of the country.

On January 28, 2012, at a meeting in Yekaterinburg, she supported the candidacy of Vladimir Putin.

On February 6, 2012, she was officially registered as a confidant of the candidate for President of the Russian Federation and of Prime Minister in effect Vladimir Putin.

On March 11, 2014, she signed a Collective appeal to the Russian public on behalf of the Worker of Culture figures of Russia in support of the President's position in Ukraine and Crimea.

On September 15, 2014, she participated in the Moscow City Duma elections in the constituency No. 6 (Golovinsky, Levoberezhny, Khovrino districts, and part of Western Degunino), where she won the majority of votes. As an MP, she succeeded in the opening of children's music studios in the schools of her district.

=== Sanctions ===
In 2004, Babkina was included on the list of persons declared persona non grata in Azerbaijan for visiting the Nagorno-Karabakh Republic, where she performed a concert.

In May 2017, the Security Service of Ukraine banned Babkina from entering Ukraine because of her performances in Crimea.

On 19 October 2022, she was added to Ukraine's sanctions lists.

In February 2023 Canada sanctioned Nadezhda Babkina for being involved in Russian propaganda and spreading misinformation relating to the Russian invasion of Ukraine.

== Personal life ==
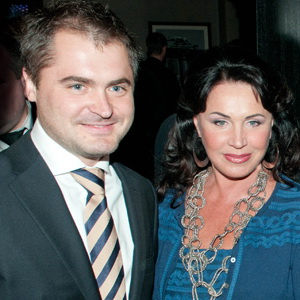
Nadezhda Babkina and Evgeny Gor (Gorshechkov) were at the fifth anniversary of the Let They Talk, September 10, 2010.

- The first husband (1974–1991): Vladimir Evgenievich Zasedatelev (September 18, 1947 – May 24, 2012), a drummer, played in VIA "Leysya, Pesnya", in VIA "Samotsvety", in VIA "Red Poppies", in the late 1980s he worked in the "Spectrum" band of Lev Leshchenko, fell in love with backing vocalist Albina Levchenko, whom he married and until his death, worked in the Presidential Symphony Orchestra conducted by Pavel Ovsyannikov, was buried in the old Pyatnitskoye Cemetery in Moscow, next to his parents.
- Son: Danila Vladimirovich Babkin (until August 20, 2019 – Zasedatelev) (born January 15, 1975), a lawyer, PhD in law, the owner of a law firm, serves as a bell ringer of the Church of Our Savior Not Made by Hands in Moscow, married since 2007 to Tatyana.
- Grandson: George Danilovich Babkin (until August 20, 2019, Zasedatelev) (born March 18, 2010).
- Granddaughter: Vera Danilovna Babkina (until August 20, 2019, Zasedateleva) (born August 14, 2013).
- Granddaughter: Marfa Danilovna Babkina (until August 20, 2019, Zasedateleva) (born April 24, 2015).
- Unofficial husband: Evgeny Aleksandrovich Gorshechkov (Gor) (born March 31, 1980, Izhevsk), singer, son of Mikhail Petrovich Gorshechkov (music teacher) and Nadezhda Viktorovna Gorshechkova, one of the presidential assistants; graduated from Udmurt State University, faculty of Romano-Germanic philology; he is a translator, English teacher, philologist. He studied in the pop vocal studio, receiving a diploma in 2002. He met Nadezhda Babkina in 2003.

== Awards ==
- Lenin Komsomol Prize (1978)
- People's Artist of the RSFSR (January 3, 1992)—"for the great merits in music"
- The award of the Russian Ministry of Internal Affairs (1998)
- Gold medal "For scientific work" of the International Academy of Sciences of Information, Information Processes and Technologies (1998)
- The Order of Honor (1999)—"for services to the state, a great contribution to strengthening friendship and cooperation between peoples, many years of fruitful activity in the field of culture and art"
- Honorary Worker of Culture of Kuzbass (2004)
- The Order of Friendship (2005) – for merits in the field of culture and art, many years of fruitful activity
- The Order of Saint Stanislaus (2006)
- The Order of Francysk Skaryna (Belarus) (April 10, 2006)—"for the great personal contribution to the development of Belarusian-Russian cultural ties, the strengthening of friendship and cooperation between the peoples of Belarus and Russia"
- People's Artist of the Republic of Karelia (May 24, 2007)—"for achievements in the field of national culture, a great contribution to the development and promotion of song and theater art, active concert activity"
- People's Artist of the Chechen Republic (March 10, 2010)—"for outstanding contribution to the development of musical art, creative activity, which has received recognition and fame in the Chechen Republic"

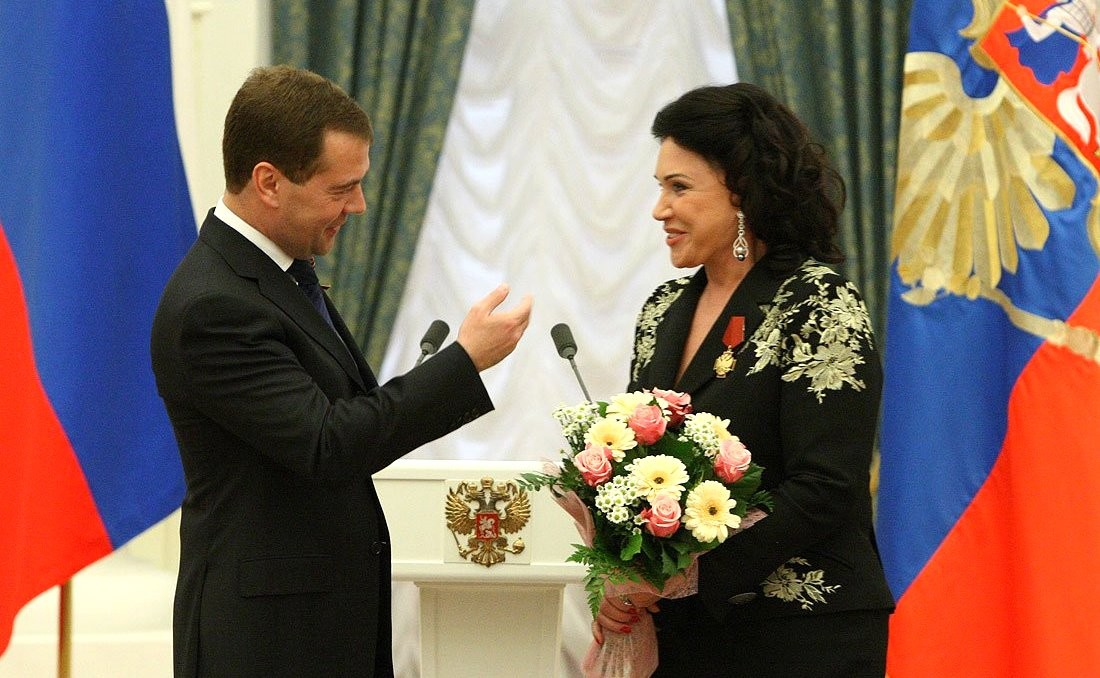
With Dmitry Medvedev on May 6, 2010

- The Order "For Merit to the Fatherland" IV degree (March 17, 2010)—"for the great contribution to the development of domestic musical art and many years of creative activity"
- The Medal of the Order "For Merit to the Astrakhan Region" (March 17, 2010)—"for the great contribution to the preservation and development of Russian national musical culture"
- The Order of the International Union of Charitable Organizations "For the revival of the traditions of charity and philanthropy" (2010)
- Honorary title "People's Artist of the Republic of Ingushetia" (June 17, 2012)—"for outstanding services in the field of musical art and in connection with the celebration of the 20th anniversary of the founding of the Republic of Ingushetia"
- The star name on the Avenue of Stars of the Slavic Bazaar in Vitebsk (2014)
- Union State Prize (2014)
- Honorary citizen of the Kemerovo Region (January 28, 2015)—"for the great personal contribution to the development and enrichment of the song heritage of domestic culture, significant merits glorifying the great power and strength of the Russian performing school, dedication and loyalty to art, strengthening cultural ties of the Russian regions and unique talent"
- The Medal "For Works for the Good of the Land of Yaroslavl" of the I degree (March 3, 2015)—"for a great personal contribution to the development of the Yaroslavl Region, contributing to its cultural and social well-being".
- Honorary commemorative badge Order of the Grand Duchess Rev. Martyr Elizabeth Feodorovna (June 4, 2015, Imperial Orthodox Palestinian Society)
- Commemorative medal "185 years to Baykov Andrei Matveevich" (April 1, 2016)
- Golden sign "For Merit to the City of Kemerovo" (August 17, 2016)
- The Order For Merit to the Fatherland of III degree (November 17, 2016), "for a great contribution to the development of national culture and art, many years of creative activity".
- Anniversary medal "75 years of the Kemerovo region" (March 5, 2018)

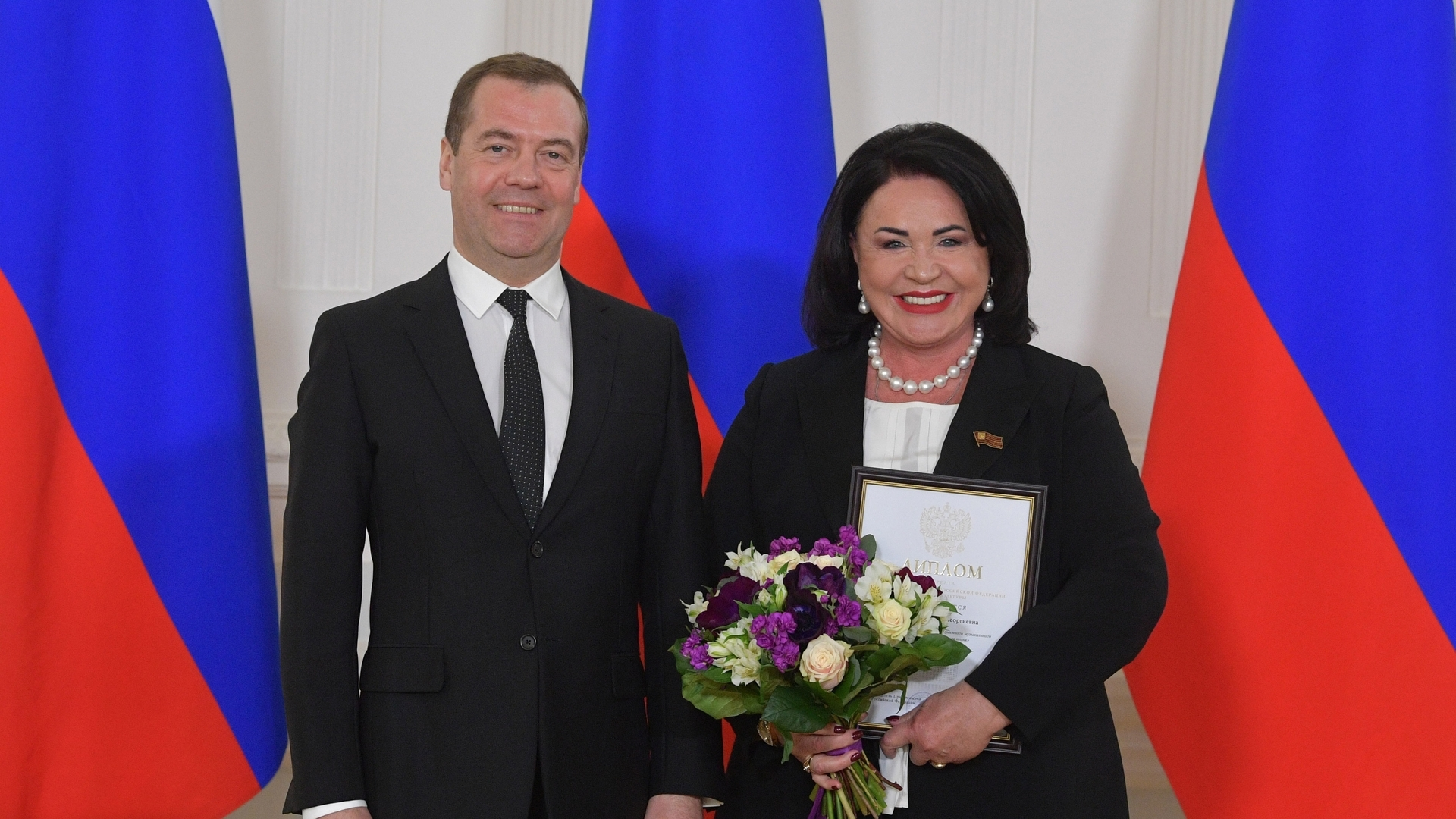
With Dmitry Medvedev, March 21, 2019

- 2018 Government Prize of the Russian Federation in the field of culture (January 28, 2019)—"for the creation of the Moscow State Musical Theater of Folklore 'Russkaya Pesnya'"
