= Elena Vorobey =

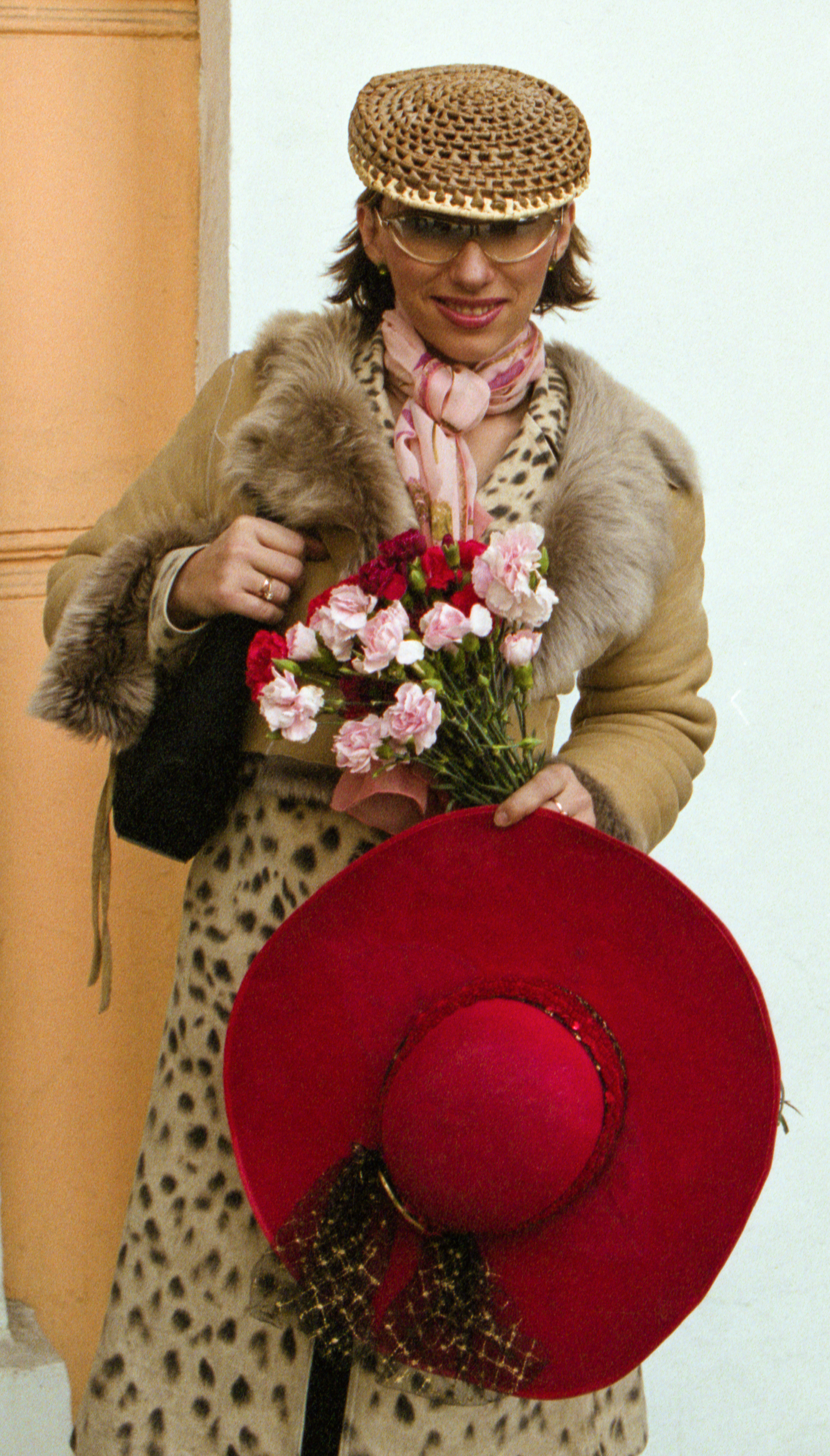
Vorobey in 2002

Elena Yakovlevna Vorobey (Russian: Елена Яковлевна Воробей; born 5 June 1967 in Brest, Belarus) is a Russian actress and stand-up comedian.

In 2012 she was awarded the title of Merited Artist of the Russian Federation.

In 2017, Elena Vorobey was barred from entering the territory of Ukraine.
