= Ya vizhu tvoy golos =

Russian television game show

- Russian: Я вижу твой голос
- Literally: I Can See Your Voice
- Genre: Game show
- Based on: I Can See Your Voice by CJ ENM
- Directed by: Sergey Shirokov
- Presented by: Vladimir Markony
- Starring: Nikolai Fomenko; Larisa Rubalskaya; Olga Shelest; ST
- Country of origin: Russia
- Original language: Russian
- No. of episodes: 8

Production
- Camera setup: Multi-camera
- Production company: Studio WMedia

Original release
- Network: Rossiya-1
- Release: 14 May – 9 July 2021

Related
- I Can See Your Voice franchise; Catch Me If You Can

Ya vizhu tvoy golos (Russian: Я вижу твой голос) is a Russian television mystery music game show based on the South Korean programme of the same title, featuring its format where the guest artist and contestant(s) attempt to eliminate bad singers from the group, until the last mystery singer remains for a duet performance. It premiered on Rossiya-1 on 14 May 2021.

== Gameplay ==
=== Format ===
Over the course of four rounds, the guest artist and contestant(s) must attempt to eliminate bad singers from a group of six "mystery singers", identified only by their occupation or alias, without ever hearing them perform live. They are assisted by clues regarding the singers' backgrounds, style of performance, and observations from a celebrity panel. At the end of a game, the last remaining mystery singer is revealed as either good or bad by means of a duet between them and one of the guest artists. (Note: Gameplay note: The number of contestants are set to one (for the rest of episodes) or a group of two (ep. 5).)

If the last remaining mystery singer is good, the contestant(s) win 1,000,000 ₽; this is also applied to the winning bad singer selected by them.

=== Rounds ===
1. First impression (Russian: Первое впечатление)
  The guest artist and contestant(s) are given some time to observe and examine each mystery singer based on their appearance.
2. Phonogram (Russian: Фонограмма)
  Each mystery singer performs a lip sync to a song; good singers mime to a recording of their own, while bad singers mime to a backing track by another vocalist.
3. Phone hacking (Russian: Взлом телефона)
  The guest artist and contestant(s) are presented with a video package containing possible clues by one of the mystery singers.
4. Interrogation (Russian: Допрос)
  The guest artist and contestant(s) may ask questions to the remaining mystery singers. Good singers are required to give truthful responses, while the bad singers must lie.

== Production ==
VGTRK formally acquired the rights to produce a Russian adaptation of I Can See Your Voice, as part of CJ ENM's dealing with Fremantle in November 2020, with Studio WMedia assigning on production duties.

Filming of the show took place at Mosfilm Cinema Theatre in Moscow; due to the COVID-19 pandemic, health and safety protocols are also implemented.

Besides from the main programme, a virtual karaoke contest was also conducted in collaborations with Novoye Radio and TikTok.

== Episodes ==
=== Guest artists ===
Legend:
Good singer
Bad singer
— The contestant(s) won the money.
— The winning bad singer stole the money.

Episode		Guest artist (Note: Players' notes: For the returning guest artists (who also include foreigners and former good singers), names are displayed in italics.; For the mixed groups, names who identified as bad singers are displayed in italics.)	Contestant(s)	Mystery singers (In their respective numbers and aliases)					
#	Date	Guest artist	Contestant(s)	Elimination order					Winner
#	Date	Guest artist	Contestant(s)	First impression	Phonogram		Phone hacking	Interrogation	Winner
1	14 May 2021	Philipp Kirkorov (Note: Foreign guest artists: Azerbaijan — Jony; Belarus — Diana Arbenina (Nochnye Snaipery); Bulgaria — Philipp Kirkorov; Georgia — Valery Meladze; Ukraine — Ani Lorak; Uzbekistan — Alexey Chumakov)	Maria Baslova → 1,000,000 ₽	3. Dmitry Bibin; (Disco Dancer)	1. Anastasia Kosareva; (Environmentalist)	6. Alexey Efremov; (Messenger)	2. Nikolai Revenko; (Romanian Translator)	4. Irina Ignatyuk; (Pianist)	5. Liza Pushko; Musical Group Mother
2	21 May 2021	Valery Meladze	Mikhail Tsurtsumia → 1,000,000 ₽	1. Ivan Filichkin; (Ballroom Dancer)	3. Sergey Mozgov; (Figure Skating Coach)	6. Evgeny Balashov; (Taxi Driver)	4. Artur Vasilev; (Parodist)	5. Olga Kovalyova; (Wedding Receptionist)	2. Ksenia Rudenko; Ex-Rockstar
3	28 May 2021	Diana Arbenina (Nochnye Snaipery)	Maria Shkolovaya → 0 ₽	3. Vasily Bozhgua; (Bass Guitarist)	1. Dmitry Lyamin; (Model)	4. Elizabeta Sharipova; (Student)	5. Maria Guchi; (Runaway Bride)	6. Maria Matveeva; (Illusionist's Assistant)	2. Azat Salimov; Graffiti Artist
4	4 June 2021	Jony	Maria Gritskhina → 1,000,000 ₽	4. Anna Bulgak; (Jockey)	1. Vasily Shevchenko; (Huntsman)	2. Nikolai Sinev; (OB Gynecologist)	3. Anastasia Vasilyeva; (Mentor)	6. Ekaterina Dobryakova; (Wig Master)	5. Maxim Maminov; Basketball Player
5	11 June 2021	Alexey Chumakov	Anna Makhlina and Dmitry Oleinik → 1,000,000 ₽	3. Dmitry Shabaev; (Producer)	2. Ekaterina Kuzina; (Bench Press Champion)	5. Helena Ambogo; (Nanny)	6. Darina Zhelyazkova; (Civil Engineer)	1. Dmitry Mitin; (Robbie Williams's Fan)	4. Alexey Polyakov; Collector
6	18 June 2021	Sergey Lazarev	Ekaterina Dedyurina → 0 ₽	4. Galina Krasnova; (Prom Queen)	5. Maxim Bobkov; (Waiter)	3. Dmitry Savlovich; (Librarian)	6. Maria Sobolenko; (Manicurist)	2. Nicole-Marie Knaus; (Young Mom)	1. Monica Gromushkina; Mime Artist
7	25 June 2021	Sergey Mazayev (Moral Codex)	Ivan Khafizov → 1,000,000 ₽	1. Alexey Tavleev; (Barista)	6. Valeria Mityureva; (Lady Violet)	2. Ksenia Rudenko; (Actress)	3. Anisa Murtayeva; (Blogger)	4. Sergei Parvitsky; (Farmer)	5. Maxim Bagba; Ice Hockey Player
8	9 July 2021	Ani Lorak	Sergei Skorobogatov → 1,000,000 ₽	3. Daria Dubovitskaya; (Bookkeeper)	1. Oleg Kolvakh; (Acrobat)	4. Mikhail Konstantinov; (Ensemble Soloist)	5. Anna Nebolsina; (Populist)	2. Ivan Makhrushev; (Baker)	6. Isabella Tretyakova; Poetess

=== Panelists ===
Legend:
Regular panelist
Additional panelist
Guest panelist

Apps		Panelists in attendance (Sorted by first appearance, with episode designations)
g#	p#	Panelists in attendance (Sorted by first appearance, with episode designations)
8	1	ST (1–8)
5	2	Nikolai Fomenko (1–2, 4–6); Larisa Rubalskaya (1–3, 6, 8)
4	1	Olga Shelest (2, 5–7)
2	6	Aglaya Shilovskaya (1, 3); Alexey Chumakov (Note: Panelists' note: Foreign attendees: Larisa Dolina (AZE); Diana Arbenina (Nochnye Snaipery) (BLR); Valery Meladze (GEO); Anna Sedokova (UKR); and Alexey Chumakov (UZB)) (2, 7); Valery Meladze (4–5); Timur Rodriguez and Anna Sedokova (4, 8); Glukoza (6–7)
1	5	Dmitry Guberniev (1); Maxim Leonidov and Andrey Malakhov (3); Larisa Dolina (5); Diana Arbenina (Nochnye Snaipery) (7)

== Reception ==
Legend:
Highest rated episode
Lowest rated episode

No.	Title	Air date	Timeslot (MSK)	Grp. 18–54 Points				OVA Points			
No.	Title	Air date	Timeslot (MSK)	Rank	Rating	Share	Density	Rank	Rating	Share	Density
1	"Philipp Kirkorov"	14 May 2021	Friday, 21:00	39	1.5%	7.4%	5.4%	19	2.8%	10.7%	9.8%
2	"Valery Meladze"	21 May 2021	Friday, 21:00	67	1.2%	6.8%	4.3%	26	2.4%	10.1%	8.4%
3	"Diana Arbenina"	28 May 2021	Friday, 21:00	54	1.4%	7.4%	4.5%	22	2.7%	10.8%	8.1%
4	"Jony"	4 June 2021	Friday, 21:00	66	1.3%	6.7%	4.4%	29	2.3%	9.3%	7.7%
5	"Alexey Chumakov"	11 June 2021	Friday, 21:00	52	1.4%	6.6%	4.4%	26	2.4%	9.3%	8%
6	"Sergey Lazarev"	18 June 2021	Friday, 22:00	80	1.2%	7.1%	3.8%	42	2.3%	11%	7.1%
7	"Sergey Mazayev"	25 June 2021	Friday, 21:00	44	1.4%	7.5%	4.8%	27	2.5%	10.3%	8.5%
8	"Ani Lorak"	9 July 2021	Friday, 21:00	93	1%	5.7%	3.7%	24	2.3%	9.8%	7.7%

Source: MediaScope
