= Khabib (singer) =

Russian singer (born 1990)

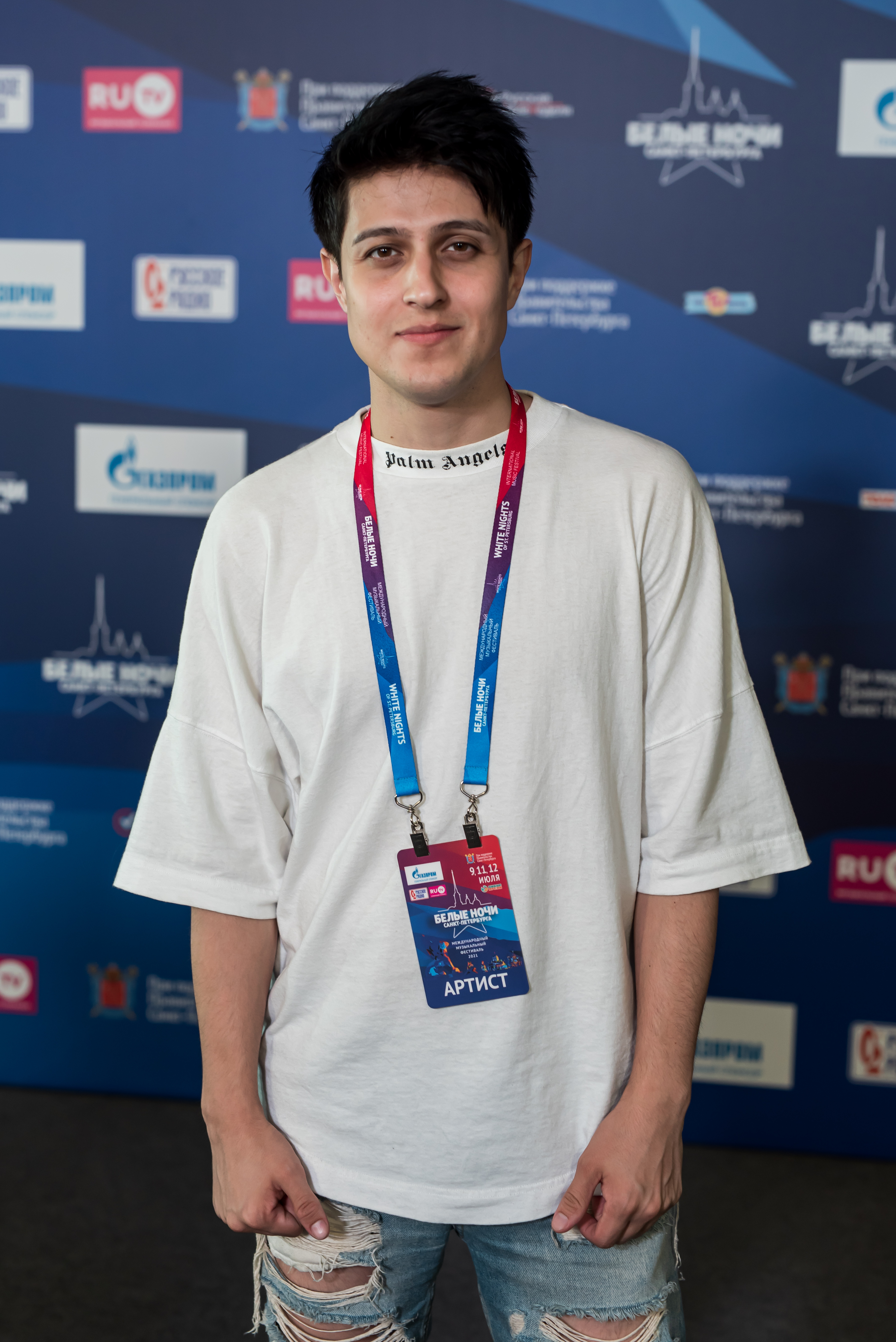

Background information
- Also known as: Khabib
- Born: Khabib-Rahman Sabirovich Sharipov; Хабиб-Рахман Сабирович Шарипов; June 1, 1990 (age 36); Kazan, Tatar ASSR, Russian SFSR, Soviet Union
- Years active: 2017-present

Khabib-Rahman Sabirovich Sharipov (Russian: Хабиб-Рахман Сабирович Шарипов; Tatar: Хәбиб-Рахман Сабир Улы Шәрипов; born 1 June 1990, Kazan, Tatar ASSR, USSR), better known under the mononym Khabib (Russian: Хабиб), is a Russian singer and vlogger. He is best known for his 2020 song "Yagoda Malinka".

== Biography ==
He previously served in the MVD as an expert in forensic science in the MVD's forensic department. He rose to the rank of police captain.

In January 2022, Khabib was banned from entering Lithuania due to his concerts in Crimea. He cannot visit the country until January 21, 2027. As a result, a concert planned for January in Lithuania was cancelled, and the singer was not allowed to fly to Vilnius after passing through passport control.

== Awards ==
Year	Award	Category/work	Result	Refs
2021	Премия RU.TV	Best start: "Yagoda Malinka"	Nominated	
2021	Премия МУЗ-ТВ	Breakthrough of the year	Nominated	
2022	Премия RU.TV	Music blogger	Won	
2023	Golden Gramophone Award	Award for the song "Ой какая ты"	Won	
2024	Golden Gramophone Award	Award for the song "Мёд" with Artur Pirozhkov	Won	
