= Alexander Buinov =

Soviet-Russian musician (born 1950)

Alexander Buinov PAR
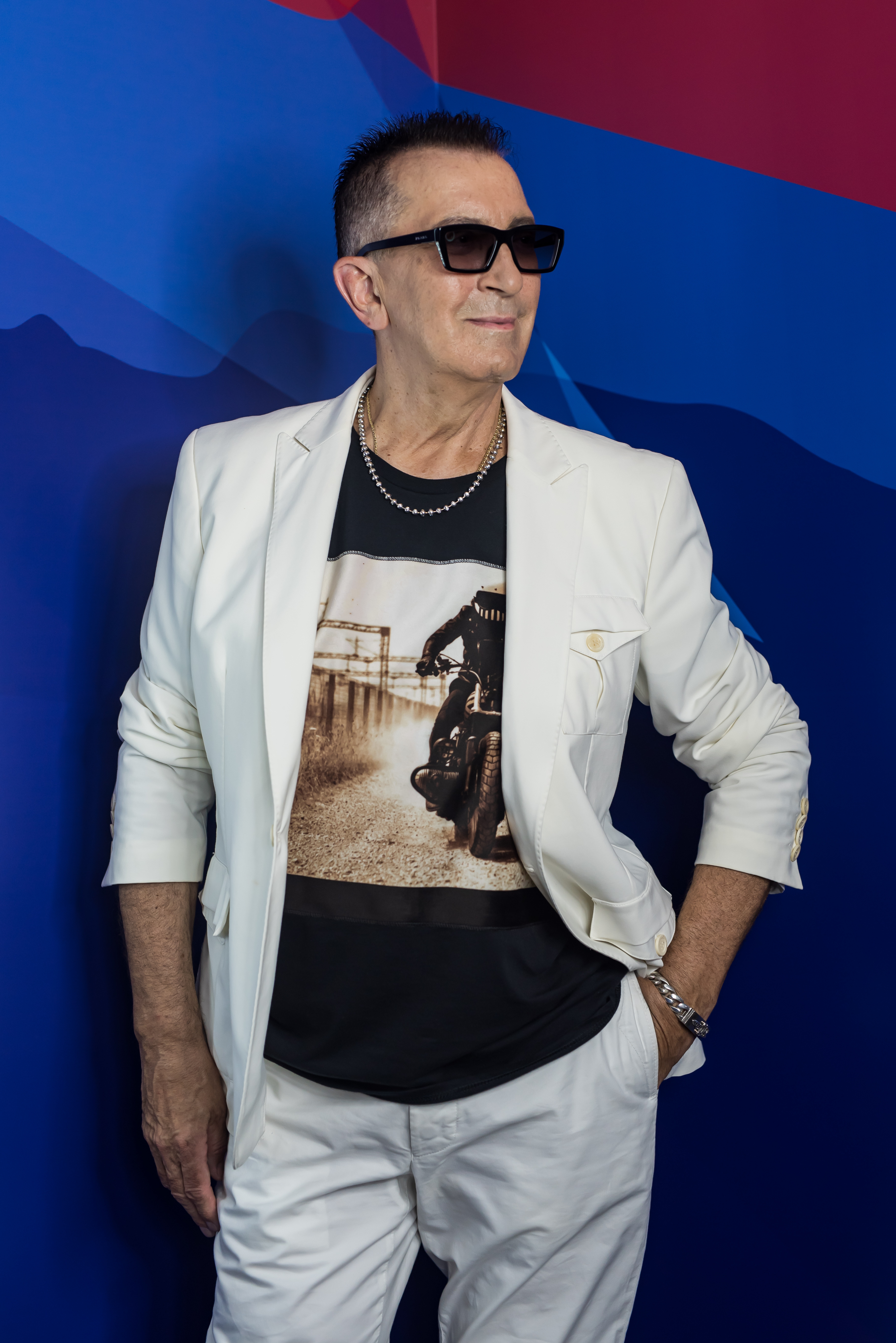
- Buinov in 2021
- Born: Alexander Nikolaevich Buinov; 24 March 1950 (age 76); Moscow, RSFSR, Soviet Union
- Occupations: Singer, actor
- Title: People's Artist of Russia (2010)
- Political party: United Russia
- Awards: Order of Honour
- Website: www.buinov.ru

Alexander Nikolaevich Buinov (Russian: Александр Николаевич Буйнов, born 24 March 1950) is a Russian singer, songwriter and keyboardist. He is best known for his tenure with Vesyolye Rebyata between 1973 and 1989, before starting his solo career.

In the English-speaking world, he is known for his song "VDV – s neba privet" (VDV: Greetings from the Sky), which sings the praises of the Russian Airborne Troops, or VDV ("Vozdushno-desantnye voyska Rossii"; Russian script: Воздушно-десантные войска России, ВДВ; "Air-landing Forces"), a military branch of the Armed Forces of the Russian Federation. After the 2022 Russian invasion of Ukraine, a number of parody videos have surfaced on the Internet with the apparent music of his VDV – s neba privet, but subtitled with English lyrics mocking Russia.

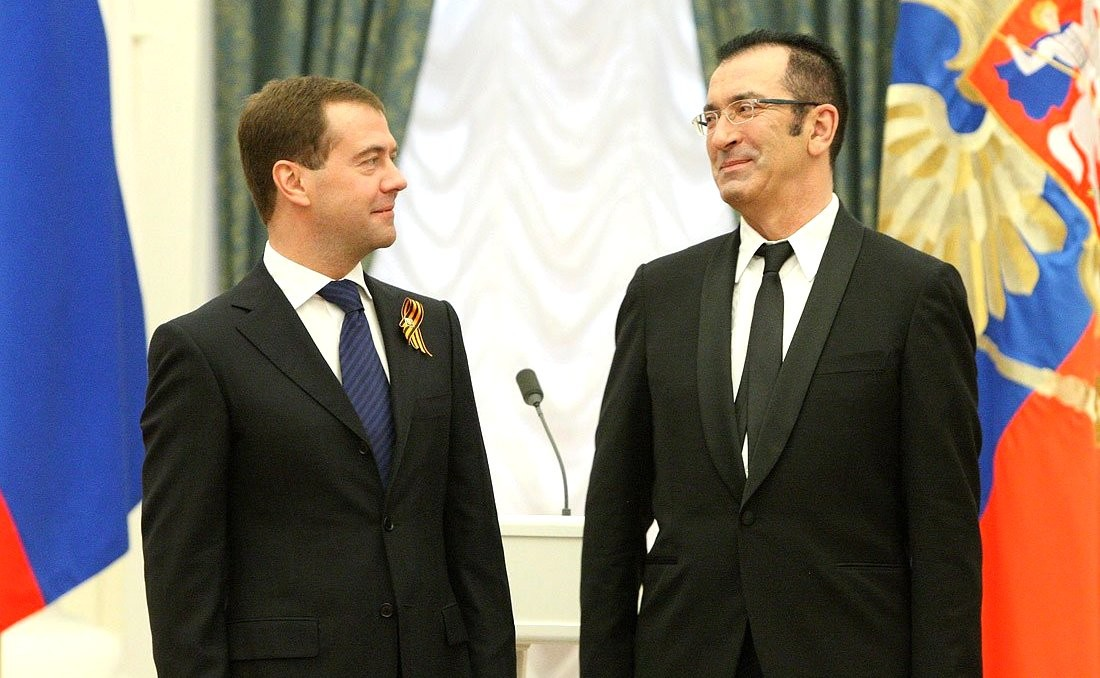
With Russian President Dmitry Medvedev on presentation of title People's Artist of the Russian Federation, 6 May 2010

Buinov was included on a 2019 list of blacklisted people banned from performing in Ukraine due to his links to the Putin government.

== Public activity ==
On 28 June 2005, Buynov signed the "Letter in Support of the Verdict against the Former Yukos Executives". In February 2011, he stated that he was ashamed of having done so.

For me, Khodorkovsky was like some unknown Ivanov-Petrov-Sidorov — an outsider. I was far removed from both the economic situation and politics. Consider it a case of "there are fools in the world". In this case, I was one of them.

— Alexander Buynov in an interview with Radio Liberty, 4 February 2011

He is a member of the United Russia political party and a member of the political council of the party's Moscow organization.

In 2017, on City Day, he visited Donetsk, where he gave a concert. Afterwards, in an interview, he said that he had "closed Ukraine to [himself] for many years — until the government changes".

In 2018, he served as an authorized representative of Moscow mayoral candidate Sergei Sobyanin.

For several years, he was a member of the Public Council of the Main Directorate of the Ministry of Internal Affairs of Russia for Moscow Oblast.

In September 2020, he appeared in the music video "Lyubimuyu ne otdayut" ("The Beloved Is Not Given Away"), which was intended to support Belarusian president Alexander Lukashenko during the mass protests in Belarus against the falsification of the election results, though his representative subsequently stated that Buinov had not known that the lyrics of the song supported Lukashenko.

In 2022, he supported the Russian invasion of Ukraine, stating that "there has been a war against Luhansk and Donetsk since 2014". He also stated that he had wanted to participate in the Russian invasion as a volunteer, and took part in concerts in support of Russian aggression.

On 18 March 2022, he performed at the Yubileyny Sports Palace at the "Za Rossiyu!" rally-concert marking the anniversary of the annexation of Crimea. On 21 August 2022, he participated in a concert celebrating Russian Flag Day in Kherson, which was occupied by Russian forces.
