= Irena Ponaroshku =

Russian TV host, journalist and blogger (born 1982)

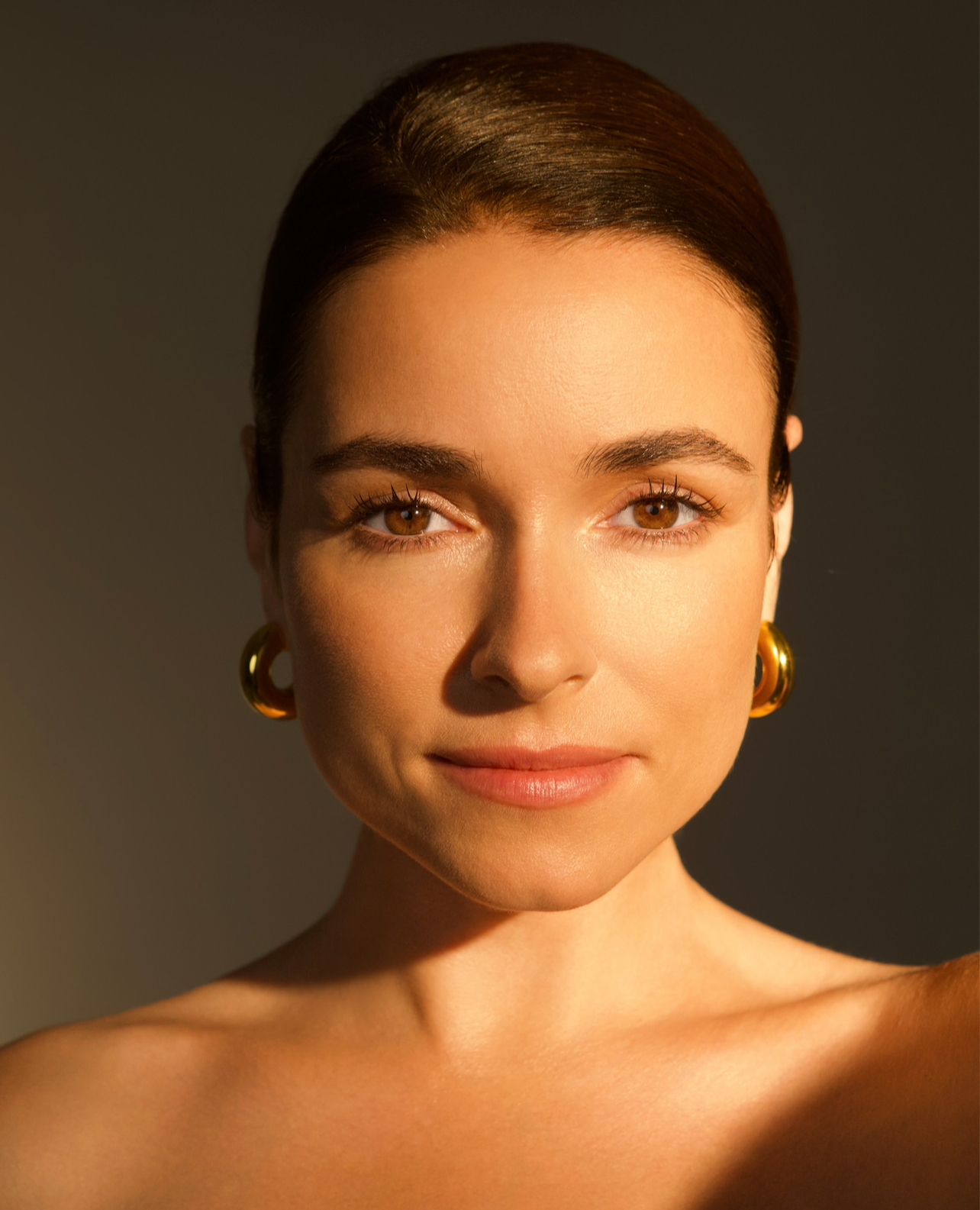
- Born: Irina Vladimirovna Filippova; October 14, 1982 (age 43); Moscow, RSFSR, USSR
- Occupations: TV host, journalist, blogger

Irena Ponaroshku (real name – Irina Vladimirovna Filippova; born October 14, 1982, in Moscow) (Russian: Ирена Понарошку) is a Russian media personality, TV host, journalist, blogger, former VJ on MTV Russia, Evening Urgant TV show presenter, Vogue Russia columnist.

== Biography ==
Irena was born in Moscow in 1982 to Vladimir Mikhailovich Filippov, former Minister of Education of the Russian Federation, and Natalia Sergeevna Filippova, who worked as a teacher of algebra and geometry for 20 years.

At the beginning of her TV career Irena claimed that she was the daughter of the bass guitar player of the Polish group “Czerwone Gitary” Janek Ponaroshku, whose family fled Poland for the Soviet Union in 1989 following the rise of the Solidarity movement.

In 2005 Ponaroshku jokingly insisted on this version: “Yes, this is not a pseudonym! It is a Polish-Hungarian surname, like Zanavesku and other heroes of jokes about Stierlitz! I inherited it from my father. He is a musician ... ”.

Ponaroshku is a cum laude graduate of the Faculty of Economics of the Peoples' Friendship University of Russia with a degree in marketing, English and French.

== Career ==
In 1999 Irena started working on the MTV Russia channel as an assistant producer, then she was a casting editor, program editor and at the age of 20 she became the host of Total Show. Later Irena hosted Night Flirt, Russian top 10, Ponaroshku Clinic, Ponaroshku Crazy News and other shows on MTV Russia. At the same time she also hosted Morning on TNT on TNT TV channel and Star On-line on Zvezda TV channel.

In April 2013, she left MTV Russia, which stopped broadcasting a month later.

In different years Irena hosted Big City and Infomania on STS TV channel, shows on Europa Plus TV and Mama TV channel, as well as On Health: Ponaroshku and Seriously on TV-3 TV channel.

In November 2009 Ponaroshku became the winner of the 100 Sexiest Women of the Country competition voted number one in the list by readers of the Russian edition of Maxim magazine.

In January 2012, Ponaroshku started an account on Instagram, which gained more than 2 million followers.

From 2006 to 2017 Irena wrote a satirical column in the weekly magazine OK!. From 2008 to 2014 she worked as a columnist for men's magazine Maxim. Since January 2018 Ponaroshku is a columnist in Vogue Russia.

Since October 2017 she hosts TV Channel SPA in the Evening Urgant show.

== Personal life ==
From December 2010 until 2020, Irena was married to a Russian DJ List, a Hare Krishna. Ponaroshku gave birth to a son on March 31, 2011.

Irena practices and actively promotes yoga, healthy lifestyle, sound nutrition and eco-friendly behaviour.
