= Infomania (disambiguation) =

Infomania is a feeling of being overwhelmed by digital information.

Informania may also refer to:

- InfoMania, the American TV series on Current TV
- Infomania (Russian TV series), a news programme broadcast in Russia on STS channel
