= Julia Mikhalkova =

Russian actress and TV presenter (born 1983)

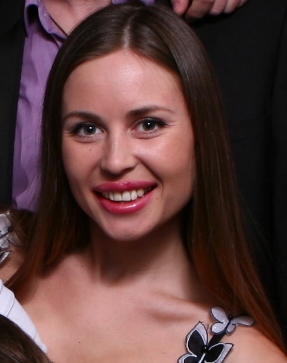
Mikhalkova in 2011

Julia Yevgenyevna Mikhalkova (Russian: Юлия Евгеньевна Михалкова; born July 12, 1983, in Verkhnyaya Pyshma) is a Russian actress and TV presenter.

== Biography ==
Mikhalkova was born July 12, 1983, in the town of Verkhnyaya Pyshma, Sverdlovsk Oblast. She studied at the secondary school number 2. While still a student in grade 10 school, Julia began working on a local TV station in the position of a leading youth news.

After high school, she entered the faculty of the Ural State Pedagogical University, Yekaterinburg (specialty - a teacher of Russian language and literature). From the first course Julia became a member of the university KVN team, which participated in the Premier League. After two years of study at the Pedagogical University, she entered the Yekaterinburg State Theater Institute (Actress Drama Theater, Film and Television), where she graduated in 2008.

In 2005, the program has become the leading programs on 'Fourth Channel' Yekaterinburg TV, later began to lead the forecast. Since 2009, the actress comedy show Ural Dumplings on STS channel.

In 2016, she put forward her candidacy for the primaries vote of United Russia to participate in the elections of deputies of the State Duma, following which she took third place.

She was invited to the Kremlin for the inauguration of President of the Russian Federation Vladimir Putin on May 7, 2018.

In 2020, she supported the constitutional amendments submitted by Vladimir Putin to a nationwide vote and appeared in a campaign video.

In 2022, Mikhalkova expressed support for the Russian invasion of Ukraine.

== Filmography ==
Year	Title	Role	Notes
2008	Serebro	Vogulka	
2010	In Love and Unarmed	bride	
2011	Morzhovka	Alyonka	
2011	Unreal Story	girl	
2012	Cool Guys	Viola	TV series
