= Britain's Brainiest =

- Also known as: Britain's Brainiest Kid
- Genre: Game show
- Created by: David Briggs; Colman Hutchinson
- Presented by: Carol Vorderman; Tess Daly (2002: Kids Heats)
- Theme music composer: Matthew Strachan
- Country of origin: United Kingdom
- Original language: English
- No. of series: 2
- No. of episodes: 18

Production
- Production location: Elstree Studios (Shenley Road)
- Running time: 30–90 minutes
- Production company: Celador Productions

Original release
- Network: ITV
- Release: 9 August 2001 – 31 December 2002

Britain's Brainiest is a British television quiz show produced by Celador Productions and aired on ITV. The show originally aired as a one-off special as Britain's Brainiest Kid on 9 August 2001, hosted by Carol Vorderman. An adult series ran from 2 January to 6 February 2002 and a subsequent kids series aired from 9 to 31 December 2002.

== Format ==
=== 2001 special ===
The original featured four different rounds:

- A set of 12 multiple choice questions, whittling down the number of male contestants from 12 to 3.
- A set of 12 multiple choice questions, whittling down the number of female contestants from 12 to 3.
- A subject-based round, where contestants answered questions on two subjects, this halved the number of competitors to 3.
- A final round, where the remaining 3 contestants were tested on their own specialist subject and that of their fellow finalists

The winner of the original special was Laura Hibbert of North Yorkshire, whose specialist subject was Charles Dickens.

Alex "Brains" Marshall was runner up. Marshall's specialist subject was the United Arab Emirates. Richard "Helium" Thomas came third. His specialist subject was the Plantagenets.

=== 2002 adult series ===
Following the success of the one-off special, a full adult series was commissioned and aired at the beginning of 2002. 12 contestants that shared the same occupation (e.g. taxi drivers, estate agents) competed in each episode.

The format was largely the same from the 2001 special, with some changes. Only a single set of 12 multiple choice questions were played in the first round, with the best six contestants advancing to the subject-based round. Also, after the mammoth tie-breaker in the 2001 special, any ties for qualifying positions after the first two rounds were broken by a tie-breaker game called 'Missing Link', where the contestants were given two words and had to work out which word in between would connect them. The contestant(s) who solved it in the fastest time remained in the game.

Another game that was also introduced in this series was 'Codebreaker', which was used to determine the order of play in the second and final rounds. Contestants had to crack a numbered code that spelt out a word with a clue to help them, those who cracked it in the fastest time got to play first in the round that followed.

=== 2002 kids series ===
The show was resurrected at the end of 2002 for a full kids series, with ten half-hour heats and qualification to a 90-minute grand final show. The heats were shown across a two-week period in a weekday teatime slot, presented by Tess Daly, and the grand final was shown on New Year's Eve 2002 and hosted by Carol Vorderman again.

The winner of the 2002 series was Christopher Guerin, from Birmingham (specialist subject: Thomas Becket). He went on to receive three master's degrees including one at the University of Cambridge, and as of 2023 is a maths teacher and assistant secondary school principal.

== International versions ==
Legend: Currently airing No longer airing Upcoming or returning version

Country	Name	Host	Channel	Year aired	Status
Armenia	Ամենախելացին; Amenakhelatsin	Nazeni Hovhannisyan	Armenia TV	14 March 2015 – 24 December 2017	No longer airing
Armenia	Ամենախելացին; Amenakhelatsin	Nazeni Hovhannisyan	Armenia TV	17 March 2019 – 22 June 2019	No longer airing
Australia	Australia's Brainiest	Anna Coren (2004); Samuel Shaed	Seven Network	5 November 2004 – 2006	No longer airing
Australia	Australia's Brainiest	Sandra Sully (2005–2006); Samuel Shaed	Network Ten	5 November 2004 – 2006	No longer airing
Azerbaijan	Əlaçı	Leyla Aliyeva (2015–2018)	AzTV	19 October 2015 – present	Currently airing
Azerbaijan	Əlaçı	İlahə Şixlinskaya (2018–present)	AzTV	19 October 2015 – present	Currently airing
Azerbaijan	Əlaçı	İlahə Şixlinskaya (2018–present)	AzTV	19 October 2015 – present	Currently airing
Azerbaijan	Əlaçı	İlahə Şixlinskaya (2018–present)	İctimai Television	19 October 2015 – present	Currently airing
Belgium (In Dutch)	Het Verstand Van Vlaanderen	Koen Wauters (2004–2005)	Vtm	2004–2008	No longer airing
Belgium (In Dutch)	Het Verstand Van Vlaanderen	Rani De Coninck (2006–2008)	Vtm	2004–2008	No longer airing
Belgium (In French)	Le Grand Concours	Alain Simons	RTL-TVI	23 March 2002	No longer airing
Belgium (In French)	Le Grand Concours	Sandrine Dans	RTL-TVI	23 March 2002	No longer airing
Denmark	Danmarks Klogeste Barn	Thomas Mygind	TV Danmark	31 August 2005	No longer airing
France	Le Grand Concours	Carole Rousseau (2002–2018)	TF1	23 March 2002 – present	Currently airing
France	Le Grand Concours	Laurence Boccolini (2018–2020)	TF1	23 March 2002 – present	Currently airing
France	Le Grand Concours	Alessandra Sublet (2021–2022)	TF1	23 March 2002 – present	Currently airing
France	Le Grand Concours	Arthur (2022–present)	TF1	23 March 2002 – present	Currently airing
France	Le Grand Concours des animateurs	Carole Rousseau (2003–2018); Laurence Boccolini (2018–2020); Alessandra Sublet (2021–2022); Arthur (2022)	TF1	11 February 2003 – 15 January 2022	No longer airing
Finland	Valiojoukko	Satu Ruotsalainen	MTV3	11 September 2004 – 18 December 2004	No longer airing
Georgia	ყველაზე ჭკვიანი Yvelaze chkviani	Nino Khoshtaria	Rustavi 2	2004–2013	No longer airing
Germany	Deutschlands klügste	Sonja Zietlow	RTL Television	22 December 2001 – 2003	No longer airing
Germany	Deutschlands klügste	Bärbel Schäfer	RTL II	22 March 2011	No longer airing
Greece	Ο Πιο Εξυπνος; O Pio Exypnos	Antonis Kafetzopoulos	Mega Channel	26 January 2004 – May 2004	No longer airing
Italy	Il migliore - Sfida d'intelligenza	Mike Bongiorno	Rete 4	4 May 2006 – 24 May 2007	No longer airing
Japan	Brainiest (ブレイニスト)	Yoko Oshita	TV Asahi	7 January 2012	No longer airing
Lebanon	مين بيعرف; Min Byaarif	Nadia Bsat	mtv	15 March 2016 – present	Currently airing
New Zealand	New Zealand's Brainiest Kid	Bernadine Oliver-Kerby	TVNZ	February – March 2006	No longer airing
Poland	Dzieciaki z klasą	Martyna Wojciechowska	TVN	29 March 2004 – 7 June 2004	No longer airing
Poland	Dzieciaki z klasą	Martyna Wojciechowska	TVN	6 March 2005 – 5 June 2005	No longer airing
Portugal	Mentes Brilhantes	Bárbara Guimarães	SIC	6 October 2002 – 17 November 2002	No longer airing
Russia	Самый умный Sami‘y umni‘y	Tina Kandelaki	STS	8 March 2003 – 31 December 2012	No longer airing
Singapore	Singapore's Brainiest	Cheryl Fox	MediaCorp Channel 5	2003–2005	No longer airing
Sweden	Sveriges smartaste barn	Sofia Wistam	TV3	2007	No longer airing
Sweden	Sveriges smartaste barn	Roger Nordin	TV3	2009	No longer airing
Turkey	Bilen Parmak Kaldırsın	Cemil Büyükdöğerli	TRT Çocuk	20 March 2009	No longer airing
Ukraine	Найрозумніший Дорослі ігри Nayrozumnishy'y Dorosli igry	Paulo Skorohodko	1+1	24 August 2008 – 28 December 2008	No longer airing
Ukraine	Самый умный Sami‘y umni‘y	Tina Kandelaki	1+1	8 March 2003 – 31 December 2012	No longer airing
Ukraine	Самый умный Sami‘y umni‘y	Tina Kandelaki	Inter	8 March 2003 – 31 December 2012	No longer airing
Ukraine	Самый умный Sami‘y umni‘y	Ludmila Dobrovolska	Ukrayina	10 March 2013 – 17 June 2013	No longer airing
Vietnam (National version)	Chinh phục - Vietnam's Brainiest Kid	Nguyễn Thanh Vân; An Huy Trần	VTV6	4 December 2013 – 14 January 2015 (season 1–2); 25 October 2017 – 31 January 2018 (season 3)	No longer airing
Vietnam (National version)	Chinh phục - Vietnam's Brainiest Kid	Nguyễn Thanh Vân; An Huy Trần	VTV3	4 December 2013 – 14 January 2015 (season 1–2); 25 October 2017 – 31 January 2018 (season 3)	No longer airing
Vietnam (Southern Regional version)	Tìm người thông minh	Phương Thảo	HTV7	1 March 2008 – September 2008	No longer airing
