= Brainiest =

Brainiest may refer to:

- Australia's Brainiest, a television game show series produced in Australia
- Britain's Brainiest Kid, a British television quiz show
