= Vladimir Filippov =

Vladimir Filippov may refer to:

- Vladimir Filippov (architect) (born 1950), Russian architect
- Vladimir Filippov (politician) (born 1951), Russian academic and former Minister of Education
- Vladimir Filippov (footballer) (born 1968), Russian footballer
- Vladimir Filippov (basketball), Russian basketball player
