= Dieudonné Gnammankou =

Beninese historian and translator (born 1963)

- Born: 1963 (age 62–63); Côte d'Ivoire
- Education: Patrice Lumumba University, EHESS Paris, INALCO-Langues O Paris France.
- Occupations: Historian, translator, Publisher

Dieudonné Gnammankou (born 1963) is a Beninese historian and translator.

Gnammankou was born in 1963 in Côte d'Ivoire. He studied in the former Soviet Union, earning a Master of Arts degree (Russian Philology and Literature, Russian Language and Literature Teacher) and a degree of Russian-French translator in 1990 from the Patrice Lumumba University /People's Friendship University in Moscow (he is listed among the 20 Notable Alumni since 1960) Peoples' Friendship University of Russia; and in France, obtaining a Diplôme d'Etudes Approfondies, DEA, in Paris National Institute for Oriental Languages and Civilizations (INALCO-Langues O) in 1991. He earned a PhD in History and Civilizations in 2000 at the Paris School for Advanced Studies in the Social Sciences, École des Hautes Études en Sciences Sociales, EHESS.

Gnammankou's work has centered on African studies and the history of the African Diaspora.

In 1996, he published a seminal biography of the Russian military leader Abram Petrovich Gannibal. The Russian translation coincided with the 1999 bicentennial anniversary of the birth of the writer Alexander Pushkin, Gannibal's great-grandson. Gnammankou's research established that Gannibal was born in Logone-Birni, Central Africa, in an area bordering Lake Chad, nowadays Cameroon.

"Mr. Gnammankou’s thesis caused something of a stir in Russia, where Pushkin has the status of a god. Roots in black Africa, Mr. Gnammankou suspects, seemed less acceptable than roots in the ancient Christian kingdom of Ethiopia. Nonetheless, his book on Gannibal was translated into Russian in 1999 and was judged the best book on Pushkin that year at the Moscow Book Fair. In 2000, a documentary about Gannibal shown on Russian television included scenes shot in Logone, as well as an interview with Mr. Gnammankou." New-York Times, By Serge Schmemann, Nov. 12, 2010.

== Major works ==
- Sous la direction de Dieudonné Gnammankou et Yao Modzinou, ed. (2008). Les Africains et leurs descendants en Europe avant le XXe siècle. MAT Éditions, Toulouse.
- Ember, M.; Ember, C .; Skoggard, I., eds. (2004). "The African Diaspora in Europe"". Encyclopedia of Diasporas. New York: Kluwer Academic / Plenum Publishers.
- "Mon voyage en Russie et en Sibérie". Caravanes : Littératures à découvrir [My travels in Russia and Siberia] (in French). Paris: Phébus. 2003. (Original in Swahili 1896)
- Abraham Hanibal: L'aieul noir de Pouchkine. Paris: Présence africaine. 1996. (Translated into English) Abraham Hanibal Prince of Logone, Pushkin's African Ancestor. London: Books of Africa. 2015.
