= Tina Kandelaki =

Russian television personality

- Тина Канделаки
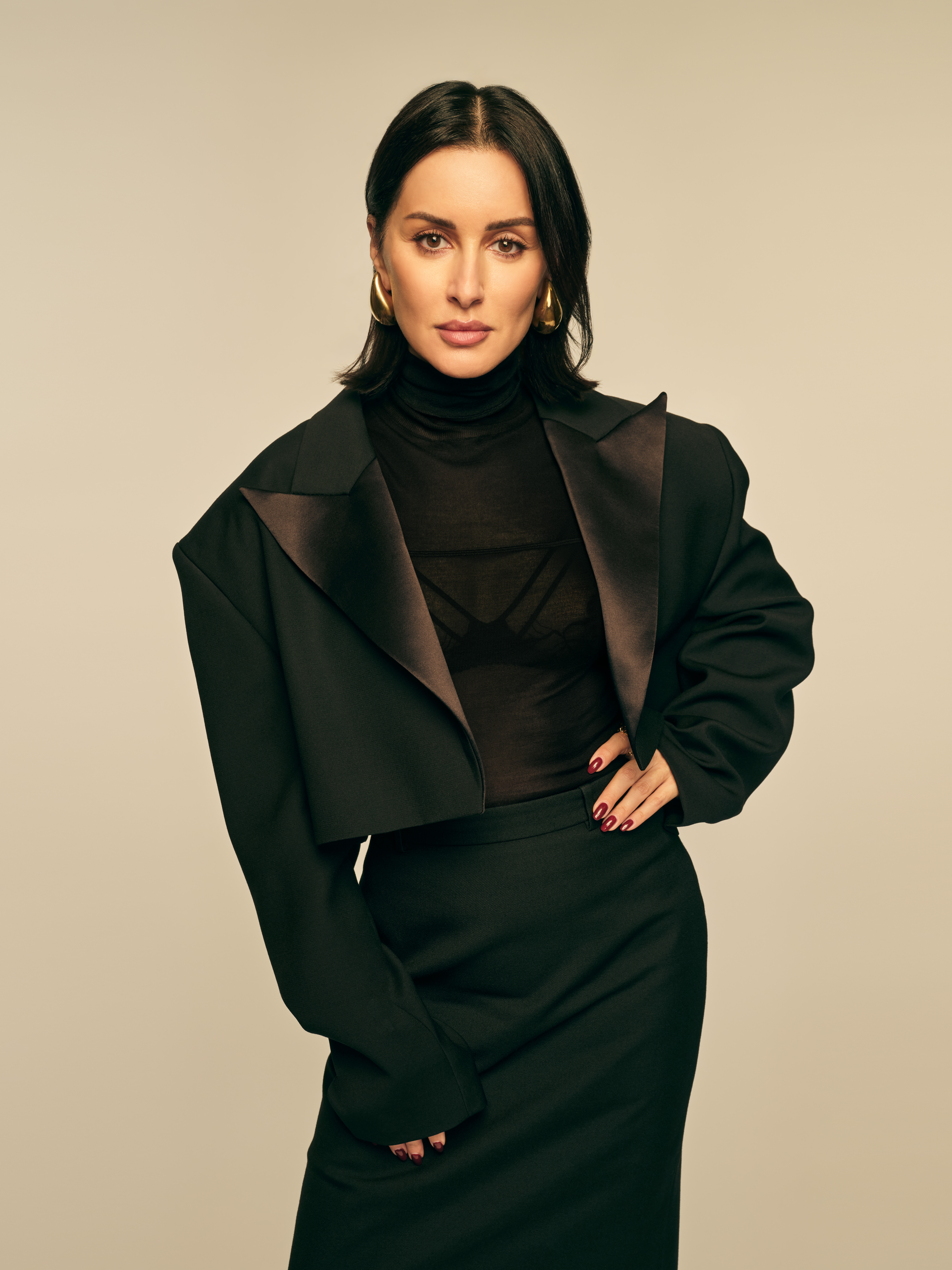
- Kandelaki in 2025
- Born: Tinatin Givievna Kandelaki; 10 November 1975 (age 50); Tbilisi, Georgian SSR, Soviet Union
- Citizenship: Russia
- Education: Russian State University for the Humanities
- Occupations: Russian journalist, presenter, producer
- Height: 1.67 m (5 ft 6 in)
- Spouses: Andrey Kondrakhin (m. 1998; div. 2010); Vasily Brovko (m. 2014)
- Children: Melania; Leonti
- Tina Kandeláki's voice recorded February 2013
- Website: www.tinakandelaki.ru

Tinatin Givievna Kandelaki (Russian: Тинати́н Ги́виевна (Ти́на) Кандела́ки, born 10 November 1975), known professionally as Tina Kandelaki, is a Russian journalist, television presenter, producer, and a co-owner of the Apostol company.

== Early life ==
Kandelaki was born on 10 November 1975 in Tbilisi, Georgian SSR, Soviet Union. Kandelaki’s father, Givi Kandelaki (1942–2009), a Georgian economist and the director of a vegetable depot in Tbilisi, moved to Moscow upon his retirement. Her father was of mixed Georgian and Greek origin. Kandelaki's mother, Elvira Kandelaki (maiden name Alakhverdova), is a narcologist of mixed Armenian and Turkish descent.

Kandelaki graduated from high school No. 64 in Tbilisi. In 1993, she enrolled at Tbilisi State University to study journalism. In 2008, she graduated from the Foreign Affairs Department of the Russian State University for the Humanities.

== Career ==
=== TV and radio ===
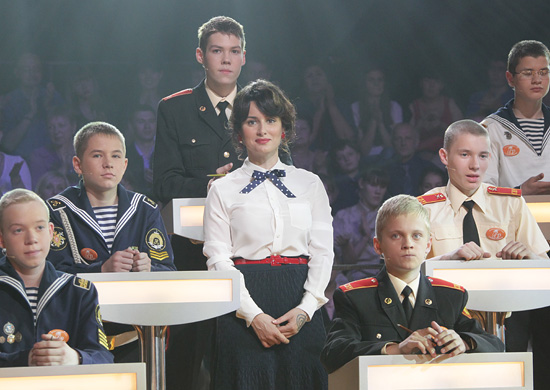
Tina Kandelaki in 2012

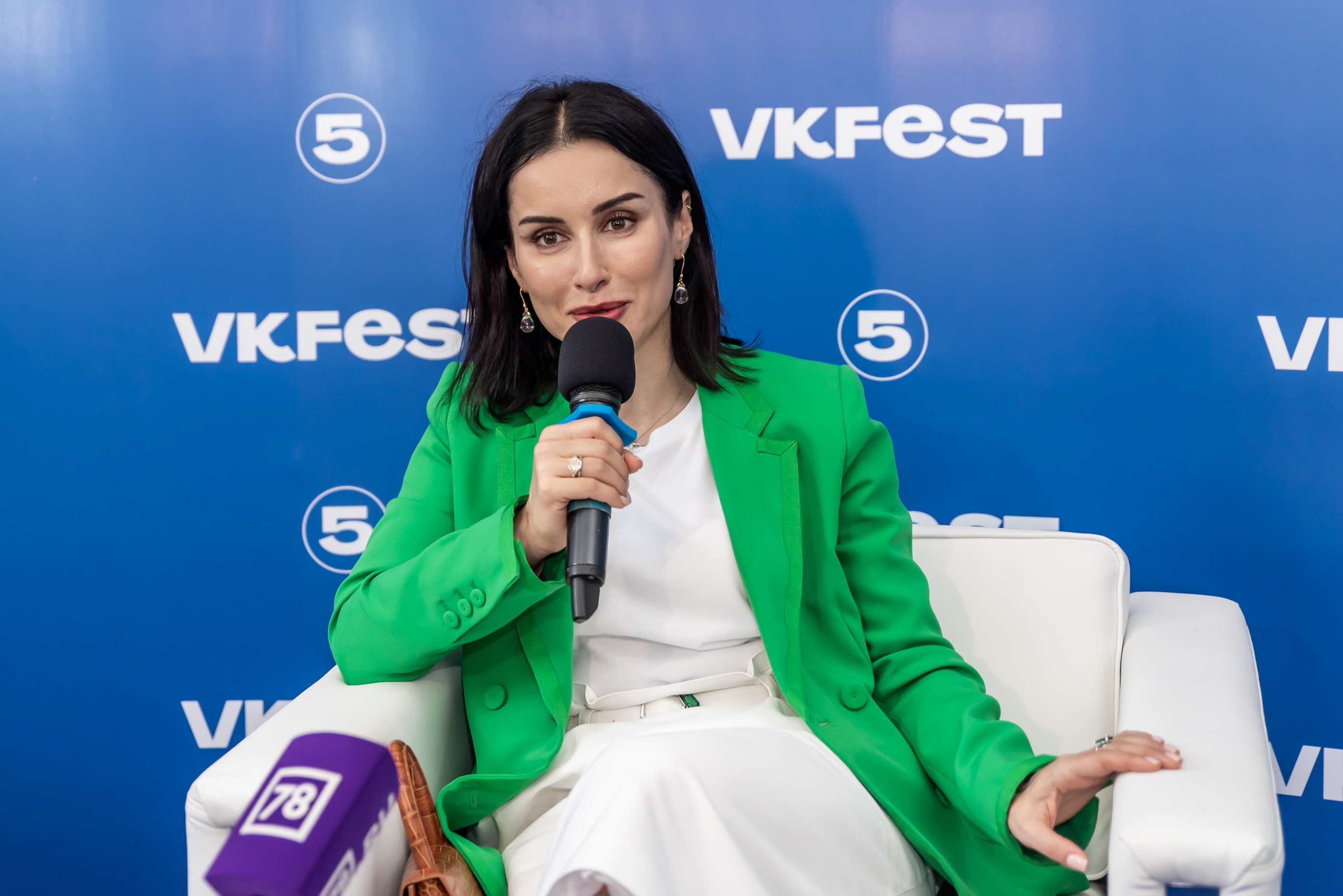
Kandelaki at VK Fest 5 in 2019

Kandelaki worked for Radio 105 in Tbilisi until 1995, when she began working for television and radio stations in Moscow, including M-radio, RDV, Silver Rain Radio, 2x2, Biz-TV, Muz-TV, Vremechko, and TV-6. In September 2002, she hosted the talk show Details on the STS channel. In February 2003, she hosted the TV show The Cleverest.

In 2006, Kandelaki, together with Sergey Dorenko, presented a weekly political program on Echo of Moscow (Russian radio station). In 2008, she hosted Unreal Politics, a show that was aired on NTV. The show started as an experimental online project. In 2009, she hosted Two Stars, a TV show on Channel One. The same year, she worked as a producer of Infomania, a TV program on STS. Also in 2009, she dubbed Juarez, one of the guinea pigs of the film G-Force produced by Walt Disney Pictures.

In 2010, she was a jury member of KVN Top-League (a TV game show). Also in 2010, she was a TV host for the show Perfect Man (STS Channel). She was also a jury member of Bolshaya Raznitsa, a parody show hosted in Odesa (Channel One Russia). From 22 September 2010, to 19 January 2011, she hosted the author's program "Alternatina" on the radio station Vesti FM, together with the chief producer of the radio station, Anatoly Kuzichev. In December 2012, the television game The Cleverest, which she had been hosting since 2003, came to an end.

From 17 February to June 2013, together with Margarita Simonyan, she hosted the political talk show "Iron Ladies" on NTV. From 17 September 2020 to 16 February 2022, she was the host of the "Special Guest" program on RTVI. On 8 September 2021, she was appointed Deputy General Director of Gazprom-Media and Managing Director of Gazprom Media Entertainment Television. On 9 February 2022, she was appointed acting director of the TNT channel.

=== Public activities ===
From 17 September to 27 December 2007, he hosted the talk show "Free Theme" on the Nor Alik TV channel and Sigma TV company.

In November 2007, Kandelaki condemned the policy of the Georgian president Mikheil Saakashvili. "A man who acted as a mouthpiece for democracy in Georgia turned out to be a medieval tyrant".

Since October 2009, Kandelaki has been a member of the Public Chamber of the Russian Federation by invitation of Russian President Dmitry Medvedev.

In 2011, Kandelaki signed "Letter 55" (a public address from public representatives against the informational undermining of public trust in the Russian judicial system), which condemned the pressure put on the judicial system during the trials against the heads of the Yukos Oil Company.

In February 2022, Kandelaki expressed support for the Russian invasion of Ukraine. On 18 March 2022, she spoke at Vladimir Putin's Moscow rally celebrating the annexation of Crimea from Ukraine and justifying Russia's full-scale invasion. In June 2022, together with her husband Vasily Brovko, she was included in the OFAC's SDN List.

In January 2024, she was banned from entering Kazakhstan over her online comments alleging that the Russian language was being discriminated against in the Central Asian country. Kandelaki had earlier criticized Kazakhstan's plan to replace the Russian names of railway stations with Kazakh ones, which caused outrage in Kazakhstan.

On 16 December 2024, she was sanctioned by the EU as

a public figure who has been using her popularity and influence in the public sphere to voice Russian propaganda and to justify the ongoing Russian war of aggression against Ukraine. She was among those who performed during the Luzhniki stadium concert of 18 March 2022 that marked the 8th anniversary of the illegal annexation of Crimea and served as a symbol of support for the ongoing war in Ukraine. After 2014, she fully supported the illegal annexation of Crimea. Moreover, she is a Deputy General Director of Gazprom Media Holding, a holding of several media outlets that spread anti-Ukrainian propaganda and justify Russian aggression against Ukraine. Several TV channels owned and governed by Gazprom Media Holding have replaced Ukrainian TV outlets on local TV frequencies previously seized forcefully by Russians after the Russian invasion of Crimea and have thus actively participated in the process of the illegal annexation of Crimea.

Therefore, Tinatin Givievna Kandelaki is responsible for, implementing, supporting or benefiting from actions or policies by the Government of the Russian Federation which undermine or threaten democracy, the rule of law, stability or security in the Union or in one or several of its Member States, in an international organisation, or in a third country, or which undermine or threaten the sovereignty or independence of one or several of its Member States, or of a third country, by planning, directing, engaging in, directly or indirectly, supporting or otherwise facilitating the use of coordinated information manipulation and interference.

== Business ==
Tina Kandelaki co-founded Apostol Media Group, a company engaged in media production and communications. Kandelaki is the owner of "Tinatin," a restaurant opened in Moscow in 2010. The recipes used in the menu of the restaurant have reportedly been passed down from Kandelaki’s mother. From May to November 2011, Kandelaki was on the board of directors of Vyatka Bank. On 29 January 2012, Kandelaki launched a political talk show with video blogger Dmitry Kamikadze called "A flight with Kamikadze," where she is the producer of the program. In March 2012, Kandelaki signed a contract with the cosmetics company Oriflame.

== Personal life ==
Kandelaki has been married to Vasily Brovko since 2014. She has two children, Leonti, 20, which she had from her previous marriage, and Melania, from her current marriage.

On 26 November 2006, Kandelaki was involved in a car accident in Nice, France. Kandelaki was the passenger of a Ferrari Enzo driven by Russian businessman and oligarch Suleyman Kerimov when the car went off-road and crashed into a tree. The cause of the car accident is unknown. Kerimov sustained serious injuries and was hospitalized, while Kandelaki was discharged just a few hours after the accident.

She does workout videos, and in January 2025, it was announced she had a third child.

== Controversy ==
Some critics in Russia questioned her stance on the conflict, asking why her 20-year-old son, Leontyi Kondrakhin, had not volunteered for military service in Ukraine.

== Filmography ==
- 2004 – Dazhe ne Dumai 2: Ten’ nezavisimosti – correspondent.
- 2004 – My Fair Nanny (Russian TV series) - cameo
- 2005 – Ne Rodis' Krasivoy (the Russian version of Ugly Betty), small cameo as a spokesperson for Zimaletto company
- 2007 – Daddy's Daughters, a small cameo
- 2009 – The Forbidden Reality, a small cameo
- 2009 – Moriachok, a music video of the Russian band Nochniye Snaiperi
- 2011 – Mama - Moskva – Sanya Sadovaya
- 2011 – Odnazhdy v Baben-Babene
- 2011 – Svetophor, cameo
- 2022 – Team M.A.T.C.H – Bella (voice)

=== Dubbing ===
- 2009 – G-Force – Juarez (Russian dub)
- 2008 – Asterix at the Olympic Games – Irina (Russian dub)
