= The Cleverest =

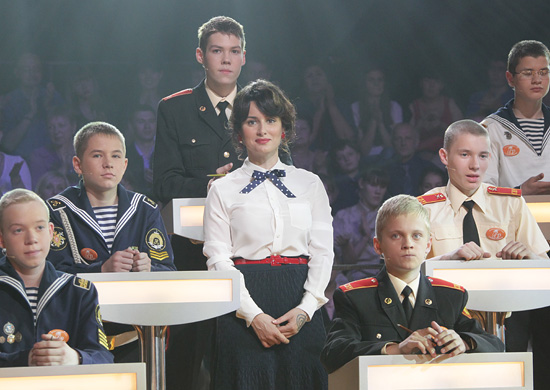
- Genre: Game show
- Based on: Britain's Brainiest Kid
- Presented by: Tina Kandelaki,(2003–12); Lyudmila Dobrovolskaya (2013)
- Composer: Matthew Strachan
- Countries of origin: Russia; Ukraine
- Original language: Russian
- No. of seasons: 14
- No. of episodes: approx. 400

Production
- Producers: Jessica Tregurtha (2003–08); Vyacheslav Murugov; Vladimir Oseledchik
- Production locations: Dovzhenko Film Studios, Kyiv (2003–08); 1, Liza Chaykina Street, Moscow (2008–12)
- Camera setup: multi-camera
- Running time: 85 minutes
- Production companies: STS (2003–12); 1+1 (2003–08); JSC Kostafilm (2008); OK-Production (2008-12)

Original release
- Network: Russia STS (2003–12); Ukraine 1+1 (2003-08); Ukraine Inter (2009-12); Ukraine Ukrayina (2013); Ukraine K1 (reruns)

Related
- Britain's Brainiest Kid

The Cleverest (Russian: Самый Умный, Ukrainian: Найрозумніший) is the Russian-Ukrainian version of the British Game show Britain's Brainiest Kid.

It was the winner of the TV contest TEFI. It was hosted by Tina Kandelaki (from 2003 to 2012), Lyudmila Dobrovolskaya (in 2013). It was first aired on March 8, 2003. The last episode aired on June 23, 2013.

== The Cleverest’s Club ==
It combines the best players of the telecast. The club credited the contestants showed most knowledge level in the current season and scored the most points. The club is divided into leagues: junior (6 and 7 grades), senior (8, 9 and 10 grades) and gold (11th grade and students). 48 persons are in each league (except for seasons when a new league grows).

== Rules ==
The game consisted of three rounds.

=== Round 1 ===
Twelve players are asked questions with four possible answers, and only one answer is correct. The goal is to answer as many questions correctly as possible. The number of questions is 18 (until summer 2004, 12 questions were asked). The six semi-finalists are determined in Round 1 (until summer 2004, three players were determined and two first rounds were with different players). Additional questions are asked if it is not possible to identify the top six players. Players who are on the main questions in round 2 have not answered them. After each additional question it is checked whether another top player is determined or not. A maximum of six additional questions can be asked.

=== Additional contest ===
If six players cannot be determined after additional questions are asked, an additional competition will take place among the players who are closest in a tournament table to making it to the next round (known as the "chase group").

Four words are given. The player must relate them to four categories, e.g. "capitals and countries":

Capital	Country
1. Moscow	А. Turkey
2. Kyiv	Б. Russia
3. Astana	В. Ukraine
4. Ankara	Г. Kazakhstan

=== The Decipherer ===
The six players with the lowest scores in Round 1 proceed to Round 2. In order to determine the correct order of the players' answers in rounds 2 and 3, "The Decipherer" will be held first.

The Decipher is the task in which players are asked to guess a word deciphered by an alphanumeric code, where each word is replaced by the corresponding number in the T9 system. The letters 'Ё', 'Й' and 'Ъ' are not used in the decipher. The sooner the contestant finishes the task, the sooner they will answer the questions in the second round, and the better their situation will be when they choose any category to play the second round. The contestant has the right to choose the game button for them in round 3.

A decipher key is as follows:

1. АБВ	2. ГДЕ	3. ЖЗИ
4. КЛМ	5. НОП	6. РСТ
7. УФХ	8. ЦЧШ	9. ЩЫЬ
	0. ЭЮЯ

=== Round 2 ===
Round 2 is a two-circle game. Each of the six players must choose a topic to answer. There are 12 topics (six topics for two circles). If the topic has been played by a player, no other player can choose it. The player has to answer the maximum number of questions correctly in one minute. One point is added for each correct answer. Up to 25 questions can be asked in one minute, so the player can score 50 points in two circles. Players need to think quickly when answering the questions.

Players choose the topic according to the results of the "Decipherer" competition. During the first circle of round 2, the host usually asks the player questions about their life and their views on all kinds of problems, probably to get to know the player better. The three players with the highest score move on to the final round.

If it is not possible to determine three top scorers, e.g. if several players share the same position leading to the final game, then the players will compete in the same additional competition as in round 1.

=== Final round ===
The “Decipherer” determines the order of the players in the third round. The player at the red desk is the first to answer, the player at the yellow desk is the second, and the player at the blue desk is the third.

The questions are placed on a tableau as follows:

1	2	3?	4	5!	6
7?	8!	9	10	11	12?
13	14?	15	16!	17	18
19!	20	21	22?	23	24!
25	26	27!	28	29?	30
31	32?	33	34	35!	36

A specific topic is chosen by each player. The cells containing questions on that topic are colored in the color of the player's table (red, yellow, or blue). There is also a category called "General Interest" (the cells of this topic are colored silver).

If player answers correctly, they score points and the square changes color to the player's button color. If they don't, the square doesn't change color and they can choose it again (but they'll be asked a different question). If the player has colored his five buttons vertically, horizontally or diagonally, he receives a bonus of five points. This bonus is only available once per game. The cells on the scoreboard are arranged so that at least five in a row contain exactly one "three-point" and one "one-point" question.

Each player is asked a total of 9 questions. The player with the highest score wins. After the third, sixth and ninth round, the scoreboard is displayed on the screen. If the leader cannot be beaten even theoretically, the game may end early. If there is no leader after 9 rounds of questions, the questions will continue as long as there are questions on the scoreboard. If there is still no winner, another contest will be held.

== Closure ==
On December 25, 2012, an administration of STS Channel announced the telecast was closed "due to the change in fiscal policy of channel".

Half a year later it was closed in Ukraine as well due to low viewership figures. Last episode was aired on June 23, 2013.

== Rules of the Season ==
Out of the 48 members of the club, a certain number of players will be eliminated based on the results of the semifinal games of the previous season (according to the ranking of the points scored) and will have to defend their membership in the qualifying matches. The number of players eliminated in the qualifiers is equal to the number of qualifiers for the next season multiplied by three. Players who were cast there also participate. Three players from each qualifier will qualify for the club. Club members participate in the semi-finals.

There are four semi-finals, which determine the composition of the players for the Super Final. Three players from each of the semi-finals qualify for the Super Final. The Super Final is the final match of the season. The winner of the Super Final is the season champion.

== Awards ==
This game won the TEFI contest in 2004 in nominating children's program.

It received the award «Teletriumph» in 2008–2009.

It won the TEFI contest in 2009 in nominating «Telecast».

== Winners of regular championships ==
- 2003 season
  - Major League: Champion George Moloschenkov (Moscow, Russia).
- Winter-spring season of 2004.
  - Junior League: Champion Marina Mintsikovskaya (Kyiv, Ukraine).
- Autumn-winter season of 2004.
  - Junior League: Champion Andrey Ovsyannikov (Mirgorod, Ukraine).
  - Major League: Georgy Moloschenkov (Moscow, Russia).
- Winter-spring season of 2005.
  - Junior League: Champion Alexander Vetchinov (Kyiv, Ukraine).
  - Major League: Dmitry Chumakov (Odesa, Ukraine).
- Autumn-winter season of 2005.
  - Junior League: Champion Andrey Ovsyannikov (Mirgorod, Ukraine).
  - Major League: Natalya Novikova (Izhevsk, Russia).
- Winter-spring season of 2006.
  - Junior League: Champion Andrey Ovsyannikov (Mirgorod, Ukraine).
  - Major League: Champion Alexey Popov (Moscow, Russia).

When this season was over the generation change happened: The Major League left, Junior became Major and new Junior League was gathered.

- Autumn-winter season of 2006.
  - Junior League: Champion Stanislav Shipachev (Kazan, Russia).
  - Major League: Champion Alexander Vetchinov (Kyiv, Ukraine).
- Winter-spring season of 2007.
  - Junior League: Champion Ruslan Samoylov (Kharkiv, Ukraine).
  - Major League: Champion Andrey Sidorenko (Yakymivka, Ukraine).
- Autumn-winter season of 2007.
  - Junior League: Champion Andrey Boyev (Kursk, Russia).
  - Major League: Champion Valeriya Lazarenko (Kyiv, Ukraine).
- Winter-spring season of 2008.
  - Junior League: Champion Andrey Boyev (Kursk, Russia).
  - Major League: Champion Darya Tarasova (Nizhny Novgorod, Russia).

When this season was over the generation change happened: The Major League left, the Junior became the Major and new Junior League was gathered.

- Autumn-winter season of 2008.
  - Junior League: Champion Alexey Malyshev (Sevastopol, Ukraine).
  - Major League: Champion Stanislav Shipachev (Kazan, Russia).
  - Gold League: Champion Nikita Torzhevsky (Nizhyn, Ukraine).

After this season the Gold League added where high school students and usual students may participate. From the moment three leagues are: two participate in a season, but the one don’t.

- Winter-spring season of 2009.
  - Junior League: Champion Anton Okorokov (Bogoroditsk, Russia).
  - Gold League: Champion Alexander Vetchinov (Kyiv, Ukraine).
- Autumn-winter season of 2009.
  - Major League: Champion Ivan Sidorov (Cheboksary, Russia).
  - Gold League: Champion Andrey Voronov (Moscow, Russia).
- Winter-spring season of 2010.
  - Junior League: Champion Denis Galiakberov (Kazan, Russia).
  - Major League: Champion Ivan Sidorov (Cheboksary, Russia).

When this season was over the generation change happened: The Major united the Gold, the Junior became the Major and new Junior League was gathered.

- Autumn-winter season of 2010.
  - Junior League: Champion Oleg Gumenyuk (Moscow, Russia).
  - Gold League: Champion Stanislav Shipachev (Kazan, Russia).
- Winter-spring season of 2011.
  - Junior League: Champion Oleg Gumenyuk (Moscow, Russia).
  - Major League: Champion Arseny Lameko (Saint-Petersburg, Russia).
- Autumn-winter season of 2011.
  - Junior League: Champion Alexandra Nosatova (Belgorod, Russia).
  - Gold League: Champion Boris Belozyorov (Volgograd, Russia).
- Winter-spring season of 2012.
  - Junior League: Champion Alexandra Nosatova (Belgorod, Russia).
  - Major League: Champion Anton Okorokov (Bogoroditsk, Russia).
- Autumn-winter season of 2012.
  - Gold League: Champion Alexander Vetchinov (Kyiv, Ukraine).

When the current season was over, then generation change and game rules happened.

- Winter-spring season of 2013 (it aired in Ukraine only).
  - Junior League: Champion Pavel Ilchuk (Krasnogorsk, Russia).

== Special editions ==
=== Participation of "The Cleverest Club" and their parents ===
There were a few special editions of ‘The Cleverest’ in program history when season shows airing:

- "The Cleverest Mom" (January, 2007).
- "The Cleverest Dad" (January, 2007).
- "The Cleverest: Romanticist’s League" (a pair game where the telecast finalists competed of 2006 season with the opposite gender partners, it aired on February 14, 2008) where winners were Violetta Skripnikova and Yury Yakovlev.
- The cleverest parents and players: "Parent’s Day" (aired on September 7, 2008, and Gaponovs team won there).
- "Together" is a pair game where the grand finalist of the Junior League and grand finalist of the Gold League competed (aired on September 6, 2009, and winners are Anton Okorokov and Andrey Yelishev).
- "Teacher’s Year": players of "The Cleverest" show are competing with their teachers (aired on September 5, 2010, and winners were Boris Belozyorov and Lilya Bukayeva).
- "The Champions Game": players that won grand finals of regular championships are competing here. It was aired on Inter on January 30, 2011, and on February 6, 2011, on STS. The winner was Valeriya Lazarenko.

=== Participation of irregular contestants ===
- A few games held in 2003 where Russian and Ukrainian teams had participated. Round 1 consisted of two parts: Twelve Russians and Ukrainians were playing by turn and three contestants of each team had moved in Round 2. After that as in the current version, three contestants moved to the final game. There were played games such as "The Cleverest Teacher" (the winner was Boris Frolov, a Ukrainian representative) as well as "The Cleverest Teacher" (the winner was Alexey Bogoslovsky, a Ukrainian representative), "The Cleverest Doctor" (the winner was Alexey Bazhenov, a Ukrainian representative) and "The Cleverest Military Man" (the record of a game was on April 12 and aired on May 9, 2003. Leonid Vladimirovich Panyushkin, a Ukrainian representative won there.
- From 2002 to 2005 the special episodes were shown in an advertising block and the cleverest man was determined among four respondents. They had to answer the questions as more as possible in 20 seconds. There were both unusual persons and celebrities. In 2005 a comic episode, where Dmitry Nagiyev and Sergey Rost’s characters of "Caution! It’s Modern!" TV series were playing, was not been aired.
- In 2007 after similar cases the known persons had participated in "Kto khochet stat' millionerom?" (Russian version of "Who Wants to Be a Millionaire?") and "The Cleverest". In September 2007 in episode 1 of "Star Wars" actors of "Kadetstvo" TV series was participated and Kirill Yemelyanov won there. Alexander Berdnikov have won in the young singers game. Mikhail Malkin have won in an expert game of "What? Where? When?". Also, there was a game where the actual and former contestants of KVN was participated. Serhii Syvokho have won there. Some time there was "?????????i????" in Ukraine, it was hosted by Pavel Skorokhodko. Tina Kandelaki who was hosted "The Cleverest" had won in episode 1 of this project.

At present both these projects where irregular persons had participated, have not been airing.

- From July 24 to September, 2011 STS channel has released co-project with the Ministry of Defense of Russia named "The Cleverest cadet". The students of six pre-university educational institutions of the Military Department has participated: institutions of Moscow, Tver, Saint-Petersburg Suvorov Military Schools, the Kronstadt Sea Cadet Corps, the Orenburg Presidential Cadet School and Boarding female pupils of Moscow region of Russian Federation.

Contestants taken first and second places in the qualifying rounds have competed in the final game to be called as "the cleverest":

- Ivan Kazayev from the Moscow Suvorov Military School took the first place, but Marat Mussov from the same place have taken the second place.
- Alexander Yegorov from the Tver Suvorov Military School took the first place, but Yegor Faller from the same place have taken the second place.
- Bogdan Khmilyar from the Saint-Petersburg Suvorov Military School took the first place, but Nikita Mikhailets from the same place have taken the second place.
- Nikolay Fomin from the Cronstadt Sea Cadet Corps have taken the first place, but Kim Smirnov from the same place have taken the second place.
- Sergey Karateyev from the Orenburg Presidential Cadet School took the first place, but Nikita Makarov from the same place took the second place.
- Anastasia Varlamova from the boarding of female pupils of the Ministry of Defense of the Russian Federation took the first place, but Anastasia Borshcheva from the same place took the second place.
- Alexander Yegorov, the pupil of the Tver Suvorov Military School, have won in the game series.

The cadet game was not been demonstrated in Ukraine.

== Chronology of show air time ==
- From March 8, 2003, the show aired in two channels: "STS" (Russia) and «1+1» (Ukraine)
  - From March 8, 2003, to May 10, 2003, game show aired at 17.30 p.m
  - From August, 2003 to January 7, 2004, game show aired on Mondays at 12.50/13.00 p.m
  - From March 6 to November 6, 2004, game show aired on Saturdays at 13.00 p.m
  - From November 13, 2004, to December 30, 2006, game show aired on Saturdays at 12.00 p.m
  - From January 14 to July 8, 2007, game show aired on Mondays at 10.00 a.m
  - From September 2 to December 30, 2007, game show aired on Mondays at 09.00 a.m
  - From January 13, 2008, to June 21, 2009, game show aired on Mondays at 09.15 p.m
  - From September 13, 2009, to December 31, 2012, game show aired on Mondays at 09.00 a.m
  - From March 10 to June 23, 2013, game show aired on the сhannel Ukraine
  - From March 10 to April 21, 2013, game show aired on Mondays at 14.00 p.m
  - From April 28 to June 23, 2013, game show aired on Mondays at 07.10 p.m

== See also ==
- Channel One (Russia) in Russia
- Inter (TV channel) in Ukraine
