= Viktor Alekseevitch Frolov =

Viktor Alekseevich Frolov (28 April 1936 — 05.03.2016) was a Russian doctor, professor, academician, pathophysiologist and medical scientist. Till his death, he was the Dean of the Medical Faculty and Head of the Department of Pathology & Pathologic Physiology of the People's Friendship University of Russia (PFUR), Moscow. He holds the degrees of Doctor of Medicine (MD), Doctor of Philosophy in Medicine (PhD), and Doctor of Medical Sciences (DMSc). He also holds the title of "Honoured Doctor of the Russian Federation". He was as well the President of the Association of Deans of all Medical Faculties of all medical schools, institutes, universities and academies of Russia.

== Selected works ==
- Frolov V.A., Drozdova G.A., Kazanskaya T.A., Bilibin D.P.: Pathologic Physiology (with the pathogenesis of diseases of tropical countries and civilization), Publishing House of PFUR, 1987, 308 pages. [Фролов В.А., Дроздова Г.А., Казанская Т.А., Билибин Д.П.: Патологическая Физиология (с патогенезом заболеваний тропического пояса и болезней цивилизаций), Москва, Издательство УДН.]
- Paukov V.S., Frolov V.A.: Elements of Theory of Cardiac Pathology, Moscow, "Meditsina", 1982, 272 pages. [Пауков В.С., Фролов В.А.: Элементы Теории Патологии Сердца, Москва, "Медицина".]
- Frolov V.A., Zotova T.Yu., Zotov A.K.: Disease as a disorder of the informational process, Publishing House of PFUR, 2006. [Фролов В.А., Зотова Т.Ю., Зотов А.К.: Болезнь, как нарушение информационного процесса, Издательство РУДН.]
- Frolov V.A.: Medical Faculty of the Russian Peoples' Friendship University is 45, Moscow, Bulletin of Peoples' Friendship University of Russia, Series Medical, Publishing house of Peoples' Friendship University of Russia, 2006, No. 2 (34), pp. 7–8. [Фролов В.А.: 45 лет медицинскому факультету Российского Университета дружбы народов, Вестник Российского Университета дружбы народов, Серия Медицинская, Москва, Издательство Российского Университета дружбы народов.]
