= Ural Pelmeni =

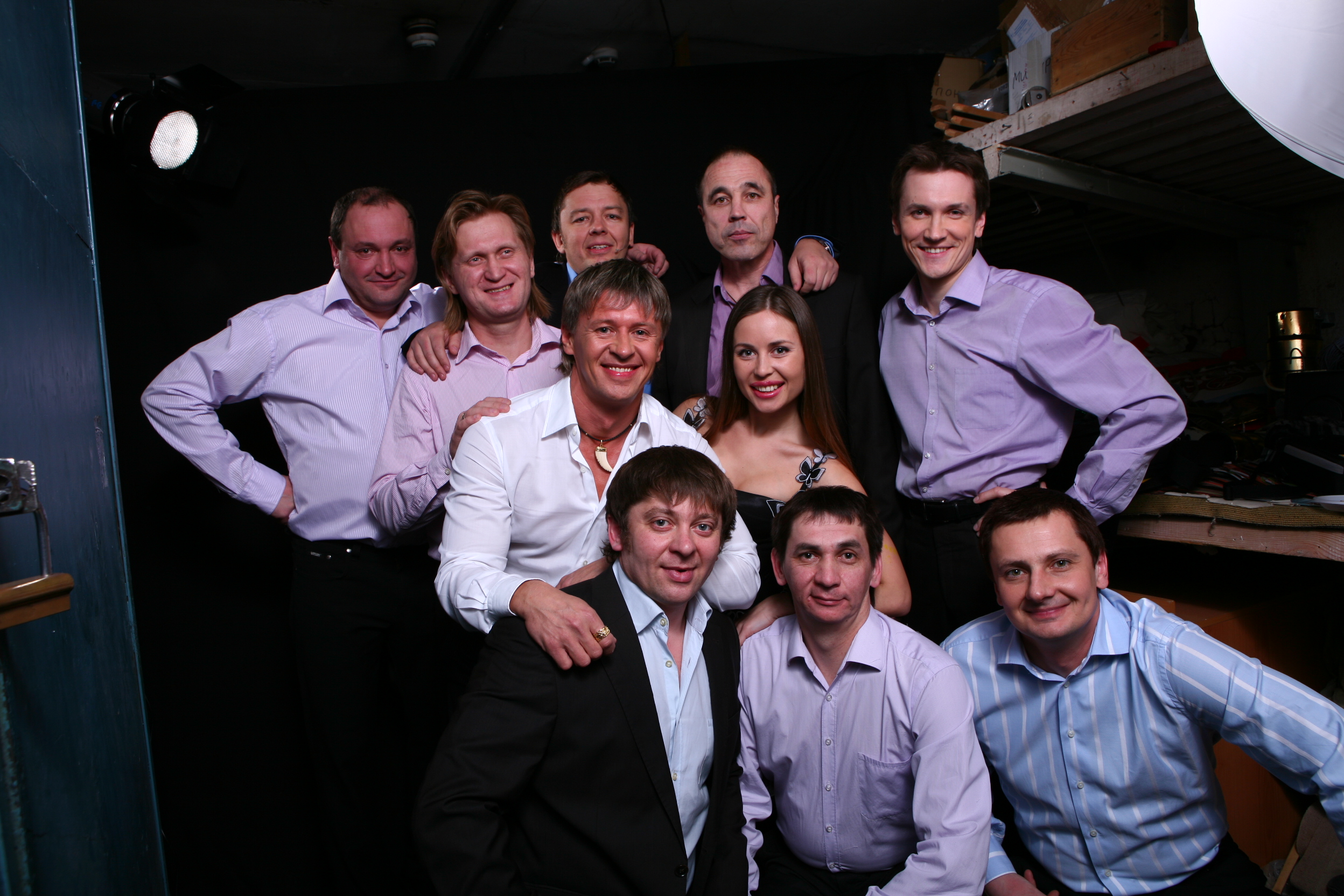
- The Ural Pelmeni collective in 2011
- Also known as: Уральские пельмени
- Directed by: Leonid Konovalov; Oleg Protasov
- Country of origin: Russia
- Original language: Russian
- No. of seasons: 15
- No. of episodes: 205

Production
- Producers: Vyacheslav Murugov; Sangadzhi Tarbaev; Sergey Netievsky; Alexander Popov
- Production locations: Moscow, Russia
- Production companies: Yellow, Black and White (until 2016); Uralskie Pelmeni Production (since 2016)

Original release
- Network: STS
- Release: October 18, 2009 – present

Ural Pelmeni (Russian: Уральские пельмени, romanized: Uralskie pelmeni) is a Russian comedy TV show broadcast by the Russian STS channel since October 18, 2009. The show is produced by the creative association "Ural Pelmeni". The show has a high TV viewing rating.

== History ==
The creative association "Ural Pelmeni" appeared in 1993 as a KVN team. It was one of the most popular KVN teams. In 2000, she became the champion of the KVN Top League.

Since October 2009, Ural Pelmeni has been producing its own humorous show of the same name on STS channel.

The creative association is also involved in the creation of other TV projects. In particular, in 2012, the team released a humorous talent show Meat Grinder ("МясорУПка") on STS channel. In 2017–2018, some members of the team participated in the humorous show Merry Evening ("Весёлый вечер") on the channel Russia-1. In 2023, the sitcom Mom will be against ("Мама будет против") was released.

== Format ==
The show "Ural Pelmeni" consists mainly of comical scenes (humor on household and social topics, rarely about politics). Comedians also perform funny songs, show parodies of famous personalities and TV shows, make interactive sessions with guests in the hall and improvisations. Sometimes invited celebrities take part in the show (for example, Aleksandr Revva, Gennady Vetrov, Igor Sarukhanov, Anfisa Chekhova, Nyusha, Yelena Malysheva and others).

Until 2016, Sergey Netievsky was the host of the show. Since 2016, Maxim Yaritsa and Artyom Pushkin have been hosting the program.

The scripts of humorous numbers are written by both the actors themselves and the screenwriters.

== Actors ==
=== Current ===
- Dmitry Sokolov - the founder of the team
- Dmitry Brekotkin
- Andrey Rozhkov - the captain of the team
- Vyacheslav Myasnikov
- Sergey Isaev
- Maxim Yaritsa
- Alexander Popov
- Sergey Ershov
- Sergey Kalugin
- Ilana Yurieva
- Ksenia Korneva
- Artyom Pushkin
- Danila Pyatkov

=== Former ===
- Sergey Netievsky
- Sergei Svetlakov
- Julia Mikhalkova
- Stefania-Mariana Gurskaya
- Roman Postovalov

== Awards ==
- In 2013, the team received the prestigious international TV award "TEFI-Commonwealth".
- TEFI 2018 — in the nomination "Humorous program/show".
- TEFI 2023 — in the nomination "Humorous program/show".
