= Abed Elrahim Abu Zakrra =

Sudanese writer, poet, and translator

Abed Elrahim Abu Zikreea
- Born: Abed Elrahim Ahmed Abed Elrahim; 1943; Tangassi El-soeq, Sudan
- Died: 16 October 1989 (aged 45–46); Moscow
- Occupations: Writer, poet, translator
- Writing career
- Period: 1960s–1980s

Abed Elrahim Abu Zakrra or AbuZikreea (Arabic: عبد الرحيم ابو ذكري, born Abed Elrahim Ahmed Abed Elrahim, 1943 – December 1989) was a Sudanese writer, poet, and translator.

== Early life ==
Abu Zakrra was born in the small village of Tangassi El-soeq in Northern, Sudan, close to Meroë town (which is different from the historical Meroë). He got his primary education in his homeland, but went to Kosti in White Nile State for his intermediate education. He also attended secondary school in Khorr Taqatt Secondary School in North Kurdufan State, Western Sudan.

== Career ==
Abu Zakrra joined the People's Friendship University of Russia in Moscow, where he received a master's degree in Russian language and literature. In 1971, he received a degree in bilingual Arabic–Russian translation. He worked as the secretary-editor (1976–1978) and supervisor in the Sudanese Culture Magazine by Arabic Al-thaqaaffa El-ssoddaneia (الثقافة السودانية), which was published in Khartoum. He worked as a temporary lecturer at Khartoum University in the art faculty. Abu Zakrra was awarded a Ph.D. in philosophy of language from Academy of Science in Moscow in 1987.

Abu Zakrra is regarded by critics as one of the prominent poets of Sudan, mostly known for his work in the 1960s and 1970s.

He died in Moscow on 16 October 1989 after burning most of his poetry and jumping from a building.

His only published poetry was in the 1960s and 1970s in many local magazines, as well as the Arab World Magazine.

== Works ==
- Travel on the Night (Arabic: الرحيل فى الليل; transliterated Alraheel fee El-lieiel) was published in 1973 by the U of K Publishing House. It is located in the Khartoum University poetry collection.
