= 2003 Peoples' Friendship University of Russia fire =

Fire in Moscow, Russia

- Date: November 24, 2003
- Time: about 2:30 a.m.
- Location: Moscow, Russia
- Deaths: 44
- Injuries: 182

The 2003 Peoples' Friendship University of Russia fire occurred at about 2:30 a.m. on November 24, in a hostel that stood among other dormitories on the campus of the Peoples' Friendship University of Russia in Moscow.

== Background ==
The hostel was housing for international students mostly from Asia, Africa and Latin America, who were waiting on medical clearances before starting classes. Many international students come to the university due to low tuition rates. It was reported that one exit was blocked and that too many people were crammed into tiny rooms. A student from Mauritius raised claims that the school accommodations were "miserable" with one of two stairwells being permanently locked. He continued that with financial assistance being low for students, many began trading goods to make money, causing an increase in baggage for students to store in the accommodations.

== Fire ==
The fire was mostly centered around the second and third floors of the hostel. An evacuated student recalled being awoken to cries of "Fire, fire!" so they ran outside, and witnessed other residents jumping from windows with dead and injured students laying in the snow. A student from Guinea spoke about how evacuees had to rescue themselves by holding mattresses as landing spots for those who jumped from windows. A press secretary for the Mayor of Moscow claimed that firemen had trouble reaching the source of the blaze as hallways and rooms were blocked with bags and boxes of belongings.

Evacuated students told reporters that dozens of fire engines were jammed into a narrow access road blocked by parked cars, causing them to reach the fire late. The blaze was extinguished some three hours after the first reports of a fire.

== Casualties ==
Three bodies were found outside, some died in hospital and another 170 were hospitalized. Many of the injured were suffering from smoke inhalation or injuries caused by the evacuation as many had jumped from high windows.

Forty-four people died in the fire. The victims were from various countries such as China, Vietnam, Bangladesh, Ecuador, Ethiopia, Afghanistan, Tajikistan, Angola, Ivory Coast, Tahiti, Morocco, Kazakhstan, the Dominican Republic, Lebanon, Peru, Lesotho, Mexico, Malaysia, Mongolia, India, Nigeria, Tanzania and Sri Lanka, and Palestinian citizens.

== Investigation ==
Education minister Vladimir Mikhailovich Filippov told reporters there were two possible causes of the tragedy, "arson or careless use of electrical appliances". African and Asian students seemed to back the belief of arson, and placed blame on the incident on far-right groups which had threatened before to raze the dormitories.

== Response ==
The Chinese Embassy in Moscow sent diplomats to the hospitals and to the site of the fire to offer consoling for those that were injured and find the exact locations of any missing or deceased students. The scene of the fire was also visited by the Mayor of Moscow Yuri Luzhkov.
