= Vladimir Filippov (politician) =

- Владимир Филиппов
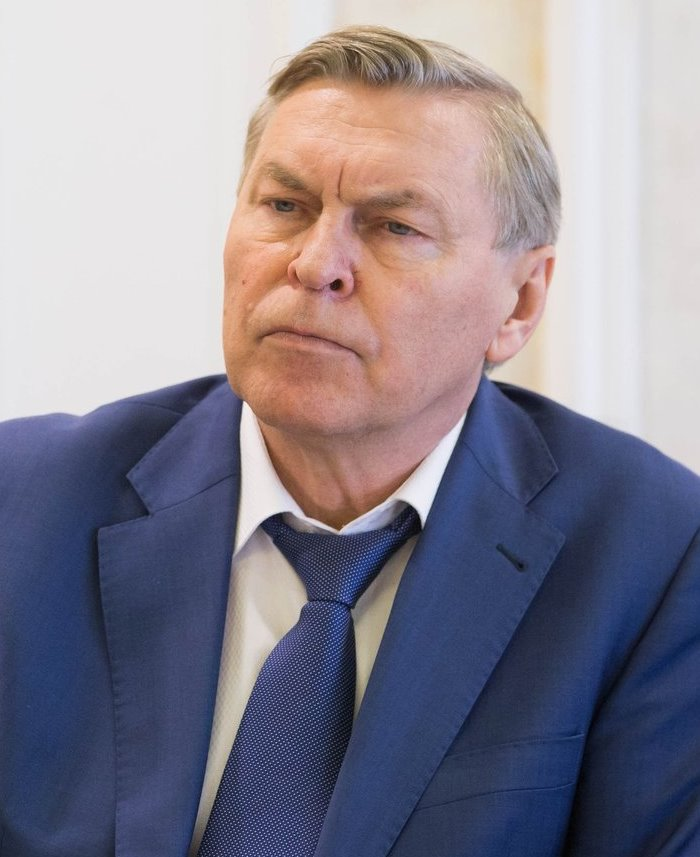
- Filippov in 2018

Minister of Education
- In office September 30, 1998 – March 9, 2004
- President: Boris Yeltsin; Vladimir Putin
- Preceded by: Alexander Tikhonov
- Succeeded by: Andrei Fursenko (as Minister of Education and Science)

President of the Peoples' Friendship University of Russia
- Incumbent
- Assumed office May 26, 2020

Personal details
- Born: 15 April 1951 (age 75) Uryupinsk, Stalingrad Oblast, Soviet Union

Vladimir Mikhailovich Filippov (Russian: Влади́мир Миха́йлович Фили́ппов; born 15 April 1951) is the President of the Peoples' Friendship University of Russia, Minister of Education of the Russian Federation in 1998–2004, Doctor in physical and mathematical sciences, professor and academician of the Russian Academy of Education.

== Biography ==
He was born on 15 April 1951 in the town of Uryupinsk, Stalingrad Region (now the Volgograd Region). In 1968 he entered Patrice Lumumba University of Peoples' Friendship. In 1973, Filippov graduated the Faculty Science (major: mathematics) and started his course of postgraduate education. In 1975–1976 he served in the USSR armed forces.

After the military service, Filippov came back to the university where he worked as an assistant lecturer of the University Union of Higher Mathematics, Chairman of the University Union of young scholars, Head of the Department of Mathematical Analysis, Dean of the Faculty Science, since June 1993 has been the Rector of Peoples' Friendship University of Russia.

In 1980 he defended his PhD thesis and later worked in the Université libre de Bruxelles. In 1986 Filippov defended the doctor's thesis in the Mathematical Institute of the USSR Academy of Sciences, specialty Mathematic analysis. A year later he obtained the scientific title Professor of the department of Mathematic Analysis.

In June 1993, Filippov was elected as the Rector of Peoples' Friendship University of Russia until 1998, when he was appointed as the Minister of education of the Russian Federation and held this post during the work of four RF Cabinets of ministers. In 1999 Federal program of the development of Russian education for 2000–2004 was adopted by the Russian Government and signed into the RF Law. It envisaged annual allocation of substantial money from the state budget for the development of Russian education in addition to the existing financing.

Upon the initiative and under the guidance of Filippov active modernization of Russian education started. In January 2000, in the Moscow Kremlin, after a 12-year break, the All-Russia Congress of 5,000 workers of education was held. Putin took part in the Congress, which determined problems and challenges of the Russian education and main ways of its reforming. The Congress approved the National Doctrine of education in the RF for the period till 2005, which was later adopted by the RF Government.

== Family ==
His wife, a graduate of the Volgograd Polytechnic Institute, works as a school teacher. Son and daughter graduated from the Economics Department of RUDN. Daughter Irina Filippova works as a TV presenter (creative pseudonym – Irena Ponaroshku).

== Filippov's role in the modernization of Russian education ==
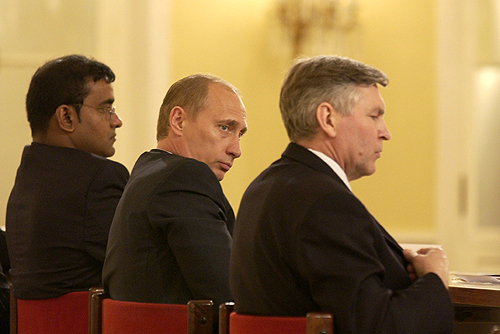
Vladimir Putin and Vladimir Filippov, 14 May 2003

In 2001, under the leadership of Filippov the program Modernization of Russian education till the year 2010 was elaborated and later considered and approved by the RF State Council with the support of Vladimir Putin and adopted by the RF Government. It envisaged (Education Review, March 2003 – Modernization of Russian education):

- informatization of school education;
- elaboration of new standards of general secondary education;
- studying foreign languages from the 2nd form; mastering two foreign languages upon completion of secondary school;
- introduction of profile education in senior classes of full secondary school;
- optimization of village schools and realization of School bus program;
- regulating school books publication to enhance their quality;
- introduction of multi-grade system of assessing students' knowledge;
- shifting salary system of secondary school staff from municipal to RF subjects level;
- elaboration of normative per capita financing of general secondary education with due consideration for specificity of upgraded and specialized schools;
- introduction of new statuses of educational institutions;
- creation of school boards in secondary schools and universities;
- improving catering arrangements in comprehensive schools;
- introduction of the Unified State Exam and organization of university enrollment on the basis of regional, university and all-Russia Olympiads;
- introduction of target enrollment in universities;
- considerable increase of financing of renovation and maintenance of hostels to enroll more students from other cities and towns;
- stratification of HEIs, separation of different categories of leading universities;
- elaboration of a new generation of standards of all levels of vocational education-basic, secondary and higher and many others.

== Scientific activities ==
Filippov is an author of more than 200 scientific and methodological publications including 30 monographs, two of which have been translated and published in the US by the American Mathematical Society. In 2006–2009 he was president of UNESCO International Organization Committee of the World Conference on higher education. At the World Conference he was elected as the president of the commission for elaboration of the final communique. In 2012 the PFUR Rector was elected as the president of the executive committee of the UNESCO Global program Education for All.

== Awards ==
Filippov has been awarded: the Order of Friendship; order of the Crown-Grand Officer (Belgium); order of Merit for the Motherland of the IV degree; order of Legion of Honor (France); order of Saint Blessed Prince Daniil of Moscow of the Russian Orthodox Church; medal in the memory of the 850th anniversary of Moscow, two acknowledgements of the RF Presidents; prize of the RF President in the field of education as well as a number of other medals, prizes and awards of foreign countries, branch ministries and institutions of the Russian Federation.
