= Patrice Lumumba Peoples' Friendship University of Russia =

Public research university in Moscow, Russia

Coordinates: 55.651°N 37.505°E

- Российский университет дружбы народов имени Патриса Лумумбы
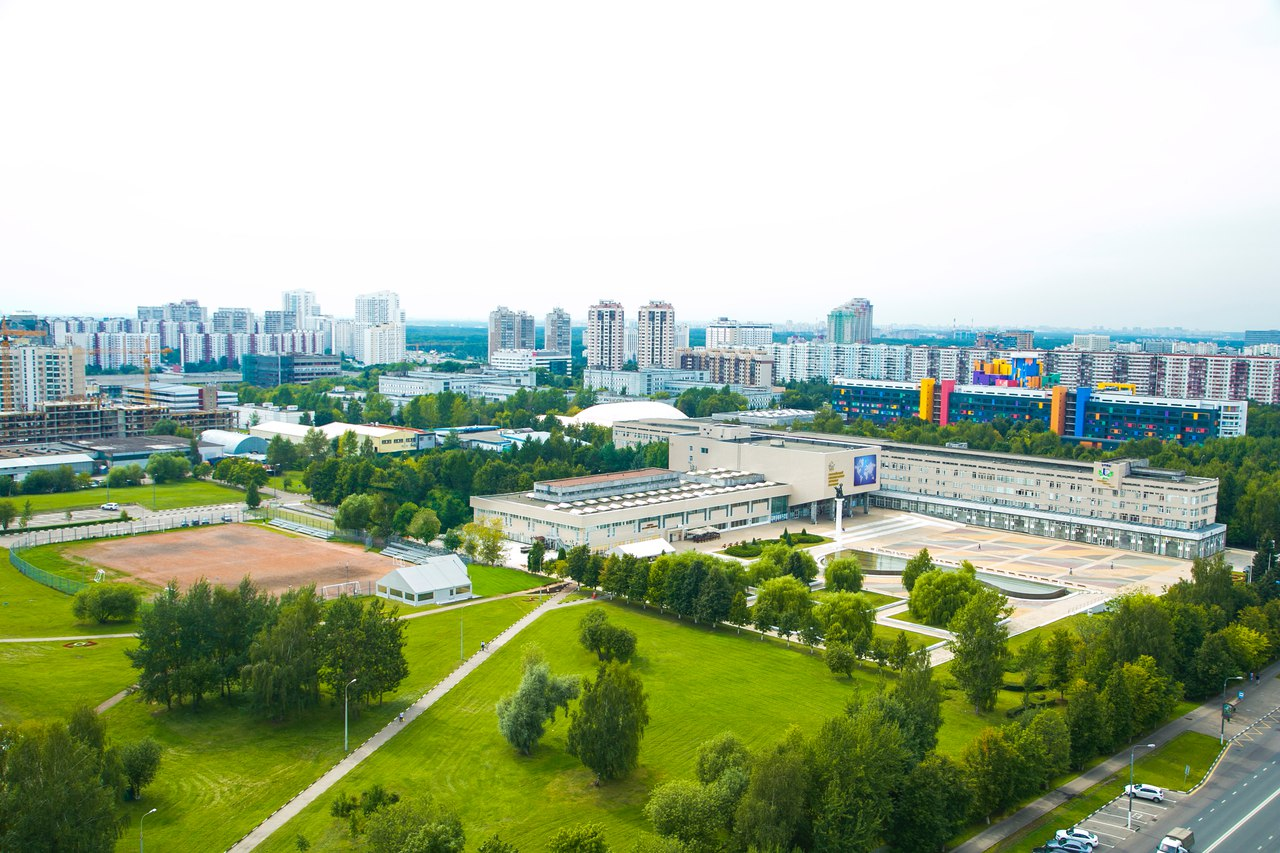
- Motto: Открой Мир в одном Университете!
- Motto in English: Discover the World in one University!
- Type: Public
- Established: 5 February 1960; 66 years ago
- Affiliations: IFPU
- President: Vladimir Filippov
- Rector: Oleg Yastrebov
- Administrative staff: 8,586
- Students: 38,484
- Undergraduates: 25,650
- Postgraduates: 11,450
- Doctoral students: 1,384
- Location: 117198, Moscow Miklukho-Maklaya str. 6, Moscow, Russia
- Campus: Urban
- Colours
- Website: https://eng.rudn.ru/

University rankings

Global – Overall
- QS World: 316 (2025)
- THE World: 601-800 (2025)
- USNWR Global: 726 (2025)

Regional – Overall
- QS Emerging Europe and Central Asia: 31 (2022)

The Patrice Lumumba Peoples' Friendship University of Russia (Russian: Российский университет дружбы народов имени Патриса Лумумбы, romanized: Rossijskij universitet družby narodov imeni Patrisa Lumumby, lit. 'Russian university of the friendship of peoples/nations named after Patrice Lumumba'), also known as RUDN University and, until 1992 and since March 2023, as Patrice Lumumba University, in honour of the Congolese politician Patrice Lumumba, is a public research university located in Moscow, Russia. It was established in 1960 by a resolution from the Central Committee of the CPSU and the Council of Ministers of the USSR to assist countries that had recently achieved independence from colonial powers. The university also acted to further Soviet foreign policy goals in nonaligned countries.

The university focused on catering to non-aligned countries, which were previously known as the "Third World". The university's main goal was to train personnel from Asia, Africa, Eastern Europe, and Latin America. RUDN University was considered the 'Oxford' of Russia in the mid-1980s due to the fame it achieved within a short period. RUDN University's stance on global issues became neutral after the end of the Cold War with the collapse of the Soviet Union. RUDN University mainly focuses on research and has partnerships with over 2,500 foreign universities and research centres.

In March 2023, the name of Patrice Lumumba was returned to the RUDN University.

Rector Oleg Alexandrovich Yastrebov signed a letter of support for the Russian invasion of Ukraine.

== History ==
=== 1960–1989 ===
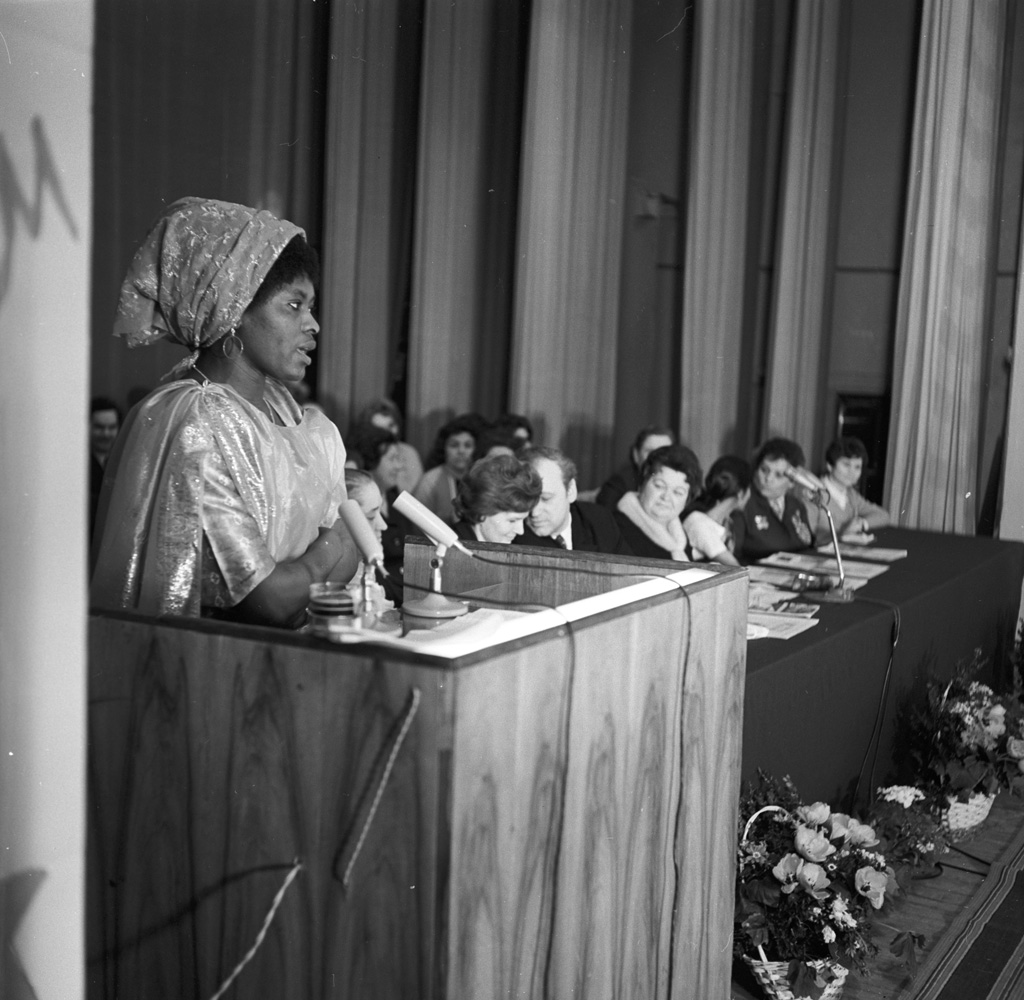
Celebration of the International Women's Day in 1972, at the Patrice Lumumba People's Friendship University. A third-year student from Sierra Leone speaks at the podium.

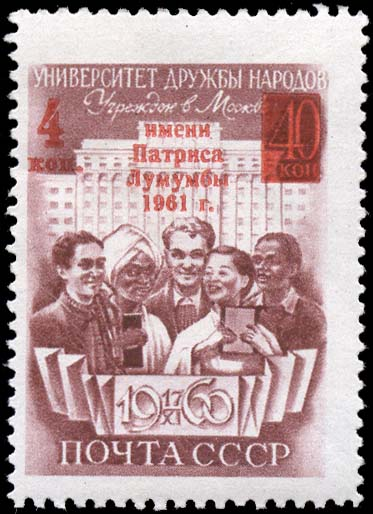
1961 Soviet stamp with overprint marking the university's name change

The university was founded on 5 February 1960. Its stated purpose was to help developing nations. Many students from developed countries also attended the university. On 22 February 1961, the university was named Patrice Lumumba University after the Congolese independence leader Patrice Lumumba, who had been killed in a coup that January. The stated purpose for establishing the university was to give young people from Asia, Africa, and Latin America, especially from low-income families, an opportunity to be educated and to become qualified specialists. The organizations mentioned as founders of the university are the All-Union Central Soviet of Trade Unions, the Soviet Afro-Asian Solidarity Committee, and the Soviet Associations Union of Friendship and Intercultural Relationship.

Sergey Vasilievich Rumiantsev, Doctor of Engineering, was the university's first Rector. He remained its Rector until 1970. In 1960, Russian language studies for international students started at the preparatory Faculty. On 1 September, Russian language studies were introduced at the six main faculties of the PFU (Engineering faculty, Faculty of History and Philology, Medical Faculty, Agricultural Faculty, Faculty of Science, Faculty of Law and Economics). The first 288 students from 47 countries graduated in 1965. Around that time, international construction teams started to appear, and the first student teams of KVN were organized.

Vladimir Frantsevich Stanis became the second Rector of the PFU. He proclaimed the "cult of knowledge" at the university, heading it from 1970 to 1993. In 1972, Stanis proceeded to extend the duration of studies, which until then were shorter, along the lines of mainstream Soviet universities. At the Faculty of Medicine, for instance, the duration of studies was extended from five to six years. By 1975, the university had more than 5,600 graduates, 4,250 people from 89 foreign countries.

=== 1990–2019 ===
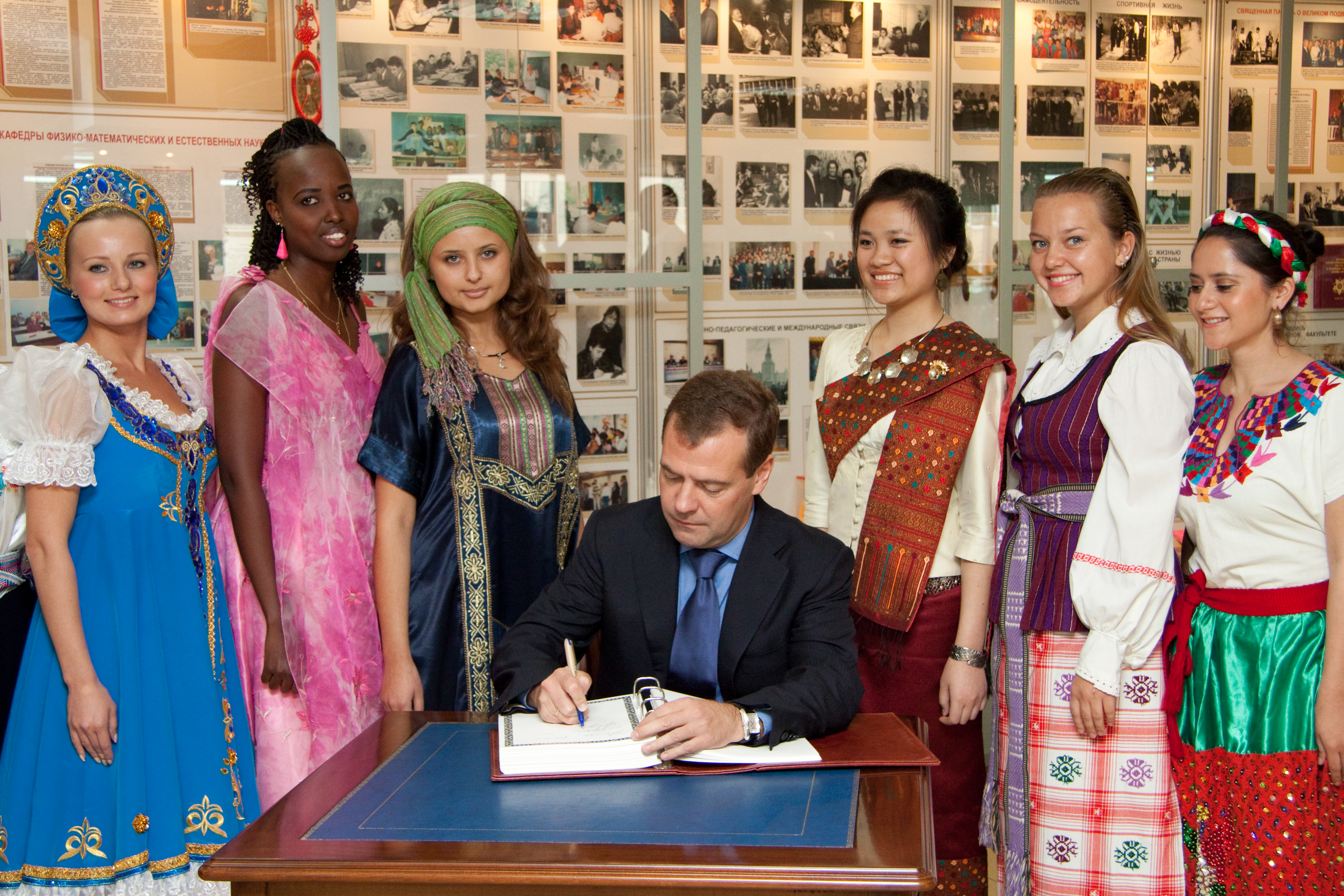
President of Russia Dmitriy Medvedev visiting, 2011

The university's name was changed to the Peoples' Friendship University of Russia on 5 February 1992 by the RF Government, the university's founder. The university's current Russian name is "Российский университет дружбы народов" which could be translated as "The Peoples' Friendship University of Russia" or, more directly, as "Russian University of the Friendship of Nations". The English-language version of the university's website, however, uses the name "RUDN University", with the acronym RUDN derived from the Russian name transliterated into English ("Rossiiskii Universitet Druzhby Narodov"). Nonetheless, it remains most common in English to use the name "Peoples' Friendship University of Russia" or the abbreviation "PFUR".

From 1993 to 1998, PFUR was headed by Vladimir Filippov, a 1973 graduate of Patrice Lumumba PFU. From 1998 to 2005, PFUR was directed by Dmitry Petrovich Bilibin, a graduate of Patrice Lumumba PFU. He was acting Rector until 2004 and was elected Rector of the university in 2004. Filippov was reelected Rector of the PFUR on 4 March 2005 and has headed the university since then. The 1990s saw the creation of new faculties and Institutes: the Ecological faculty, the Faculty of Economics, the faculty of Law, the Philological faculty, the faculty of Humanities and Social Sciences, the faculty of Refresher Training for Health Care Professionals, the Institute of Foreign Languages, the Institute of Distance Learning, the Institute of Hospitality Business and Tourism, and the Institute of Gravitation and Cosmology.

More than 77,000 graduates work in 170 countries, among them more than 5,500 holders of PhD and Doctorate degrees. Lecturers train specialists in 62 majors and lines of study. More than 29,000 graduate and postgraduate students from 140 countries studied at the university as of 2014. They represented more than 150 nations of the world. It has a team of 4,500 employees, among them 2,826 teachers. Foreign and Russian political and public figures, scholars, and scientists have become PFUR Emeritus Professors.

=== 2020–present ===
The university and 11 others from Russia were suspended from the European University Association (EUA) following support for the 2022 Russian invasion of Ukraine by its president Vladimir Mikhailovich Filippov in a statement issued by the Russian Union of Rectors (RUR) in March 2022. The EUA justified the suspension on the support expressed in the statement, stating said universities were "opposed to the European values that they committed to when joining EUA". In early March 2022, open letters were published calling for an end to the war in Ukraine on behalf of employees, students, and graduates of several Russian universities, including the Peoples' Friendship University of Russia.

== Organization ==
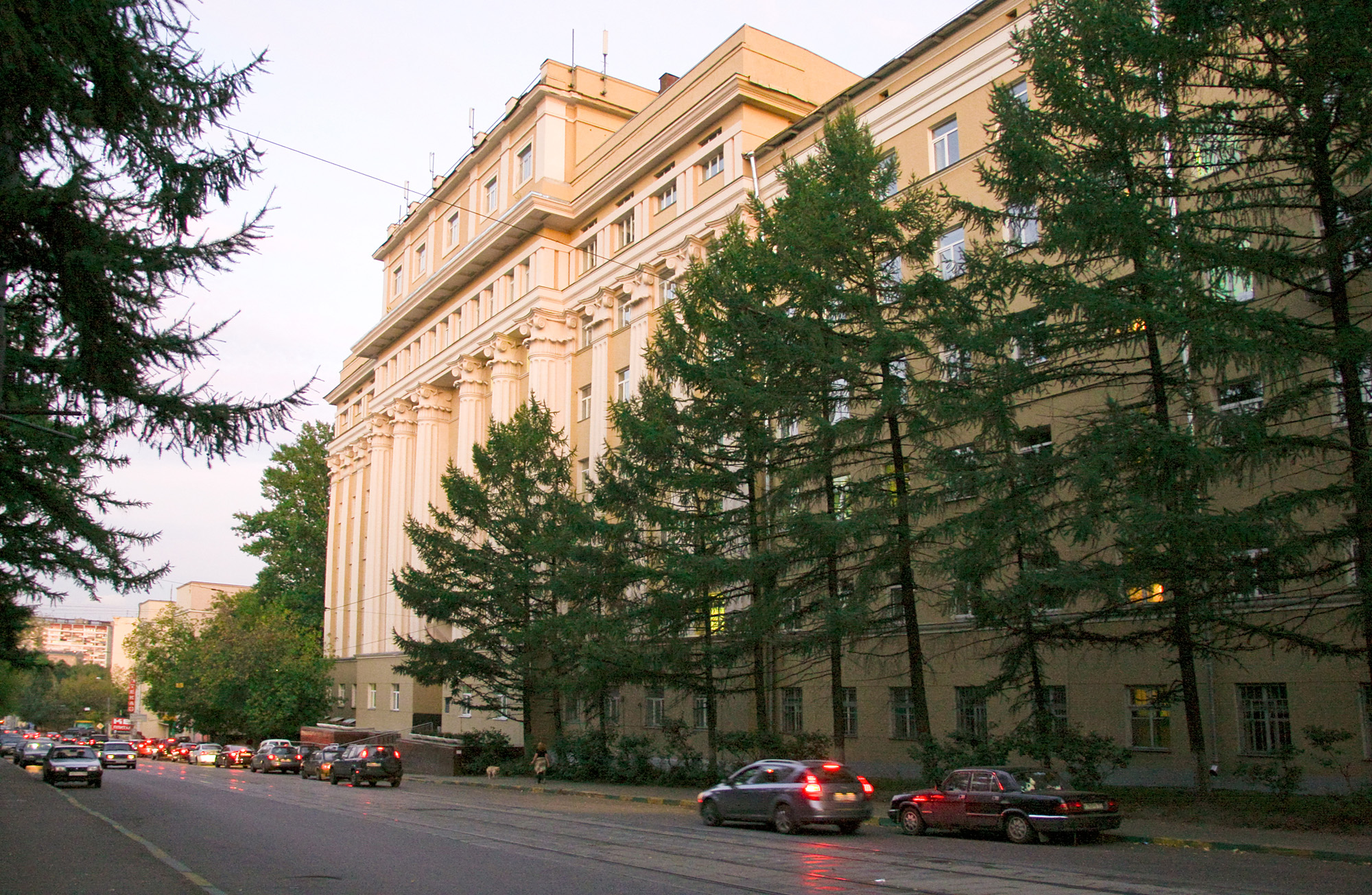
The Campus of Engineering Academy and Faculty of Science. The block at Sergo Ordzhonikidze street, 3/1 was built in 1930 and was the main house of the Military Academy of the General Staff of the Armed Forces of USSR.

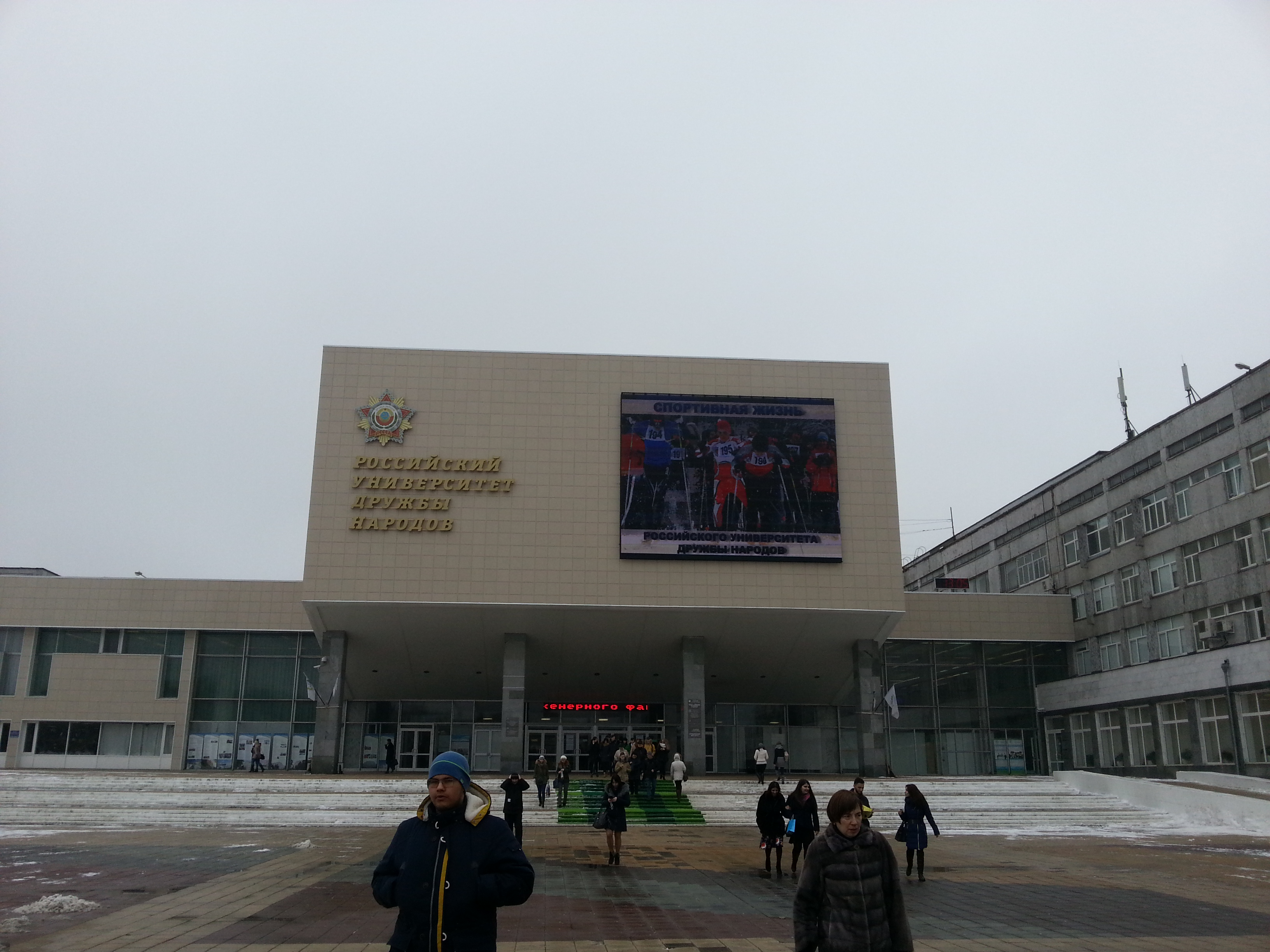
The Main building of PFUR (called Cross), 2016. The building serves the Rector, Faculty of Economics, and Institute for Law.

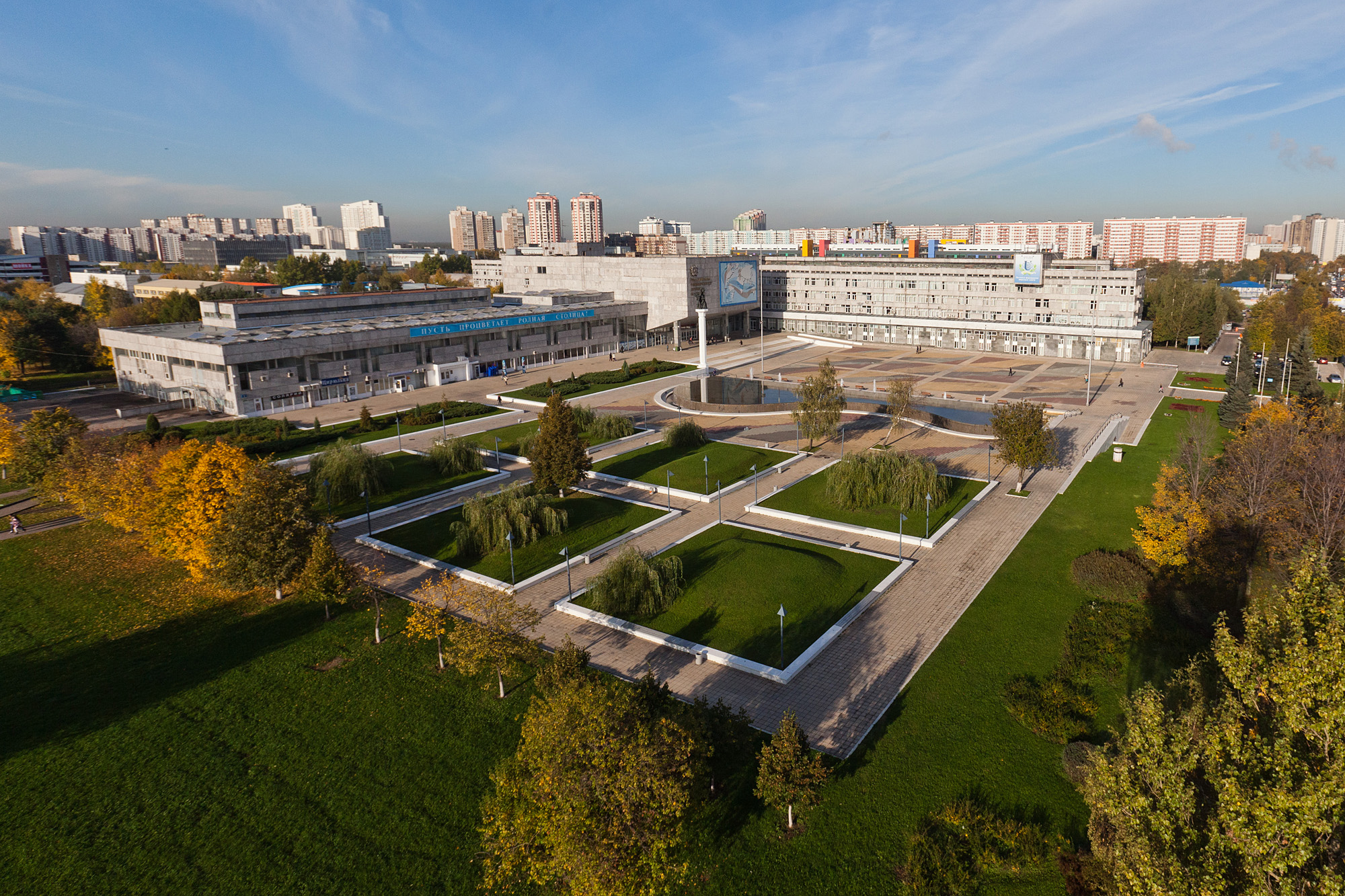
PFUR main square. It started construction in 1966 in the South-West district of Moscow.

- Agrarian Technological Institute: It was founded in 1961. It has about 1,000 students and five teaching and research departments (The Agrobiological Department; The Agricultural Engineering Department; the Department of Veterinary Medicine; the Department of Technosphere Safety; the Department of Foreign Languages). It has more than 100 teachers, among them 26 DSc (full professors) and 66 PhDs.
- Faculty of Humanitarian and social sciences: It was founded in 1996 (after the re-organization of the Historical-Philological faculty). It has more than 2,500 students and 12 departments. It has more than 250 teachers, including one corresponding member of the Russian Academy of Sciences, 22 academicians of various public academies of sciences, 66 full professors, and 118 PhDs. The faculty maintains close ties and cooperates with universities in France, Germany, Spain, the Czech Republic, the United States, Canada, China, Egypt, Syria, and Iran. PFUR students participate in academic exchange with partner universities and research centres worldwide. It helps them not only to improve their professional skills and master foreign languages but also to facilitate adaptation to the modern world.
- Engineering academy: It was founded in 1961. It has more than 2,600 students and 16 departments. It has more than 240 teachers, among them 17 corresponding members and academicians of various academies of sciences, 46 full professors, and 110 PhDs. The main aim of the Engineering faculty is to prepare specialists who, apart from their significant qualifications, could head enterprises and run businesses.
- Faculty of the Russian language and general educational disciplines: It was founded in 1960. It has more than 1,000 students and nine departments. It has about 200 teachers, seven full professors and 62 PhDs. The Faculty teaches the Russian language to international students so that they can study at PFUR's main faculties and other Russian universities. Every year more than 1,000 students from more than 140 countries study at the Faculty to continue with 62 lines of study and specialities at the main faculties. Scholars of the Faculty organize international scientific-research conferences on the problems of teaching Russian as a foreign language and interdisciplinary communication.
- Institute for Medicine: It was founded in 1961. It has more than 2,300 students and 43 departments, and two independent courses. It has 420 lecturers – 5 academicians and two corresponding members of the Russian academy of medical sciences; 24 academicians and corresponding members of social academies; 15 Honored scientists of the Russian Federation (RF), three laureates of RF State Prizes, two laureates of government State Prizes, 132 full professors and 220 PhDs. Functioning at the faculty are the Students’ scientific society which helps students become familiar with research from the beginning; the Young medical doctors’ community; the Students’ theatre Hippocrates—the lecture centre where lectures in literature, music, and history are presented. The pre-university education is provided at the Medik medical-biological school (preliminary courses). Today, the Institute for Medicine of PFUR is equipped with 14 novel clinical laboratories; computer testing and TV broadcasting are used in the training process. For refinement in an experimental treatment, subdivisions of computer tomography, liver fibre scanning, and andrology have been created.
- Faculty of Science: It was founded in 1961. It has about 900 students and 16 departments, about 280 lecturers, 65 full professors and 160 PhDs.
1. The Philological faculty: It was founded in 1996 (after the re-organization of the Historical-philological faculty). It has more than 2800 students and nine departments. It has about 155 teachers, 17 corresponding members and academicians, 43 full professors, and 120 PhDs. The scientific life of the faculty is very active: scholars elaborate various trends, apply for and get grants, and participate in international, national, and branch conferences, seminars, and symposia; there are Doctorate dissertation councils for philological, pedagogic and psychological sciences. Russkiy Mir Foundation opened its department inside of RUDN in 2008.[1] Russkiy Mir foundation, created by Vladimir Putin in 2007, is a government-funded organization promoting the Russian language, culture, and educational programs abroad.
- Ecological faculty: It was founded in 1992. It has 514 students and eight departments: the faculty numbers 80, 15 academicians and corresponding members, 35 full professors, and 31 PhDs. At the Ecological faculty, students can master general educational disciplines but also a range of particular disciplines in system ecology, human ecology, eco monitoring, ecosystems management, eco expertise, radioecology, and geoinformation technologies. Lectures are given by leading foreign experts in international ecological projects and ecologists from global companies represented in the Russian market.
- Faculty of Economics: It was founded in 1995 (after the re-organization of the Faculty of Economics and Law). It has more than 1,500 students, ten departments, and two laboratories. It has 160 teachers, ten academicians and corresponding members of various academies of sciences, 24 full professors, and 74 PhDs.
- Law Institute: It was founded in 1995 (after reorganizing the Faculty of Economics and Law). It has more than 1,800 students and nine departments. It has about 180 faculty members, including three academicians and corresponding members, 32 full professors, and 71 PhDs. Law students participate in international exchange programs every year. They undergo study courses at universities in France, Spain, Italy, the Czech Republic, the US, Finland, Austria, China, and other countries.
- Institute of Hospitality Business and Tourism

== Research and development ==
- Academic-research Institute of Gravitation and Cosmology
- Institute of World economy and business
- Institute of Medico-Biological Problems

The university staff includes about 5,000 employees; among them are 442 professors and Doctors of Science, 807 associate professors and candidates of science, 91 academicians and Corresponding Members of academies of Russia, 50 Honoured workers of Science of the Russian Federation, 56 PFUR teachers and professors are full members of international academies and learned societies, as well as other general employees.

== Campuses ==
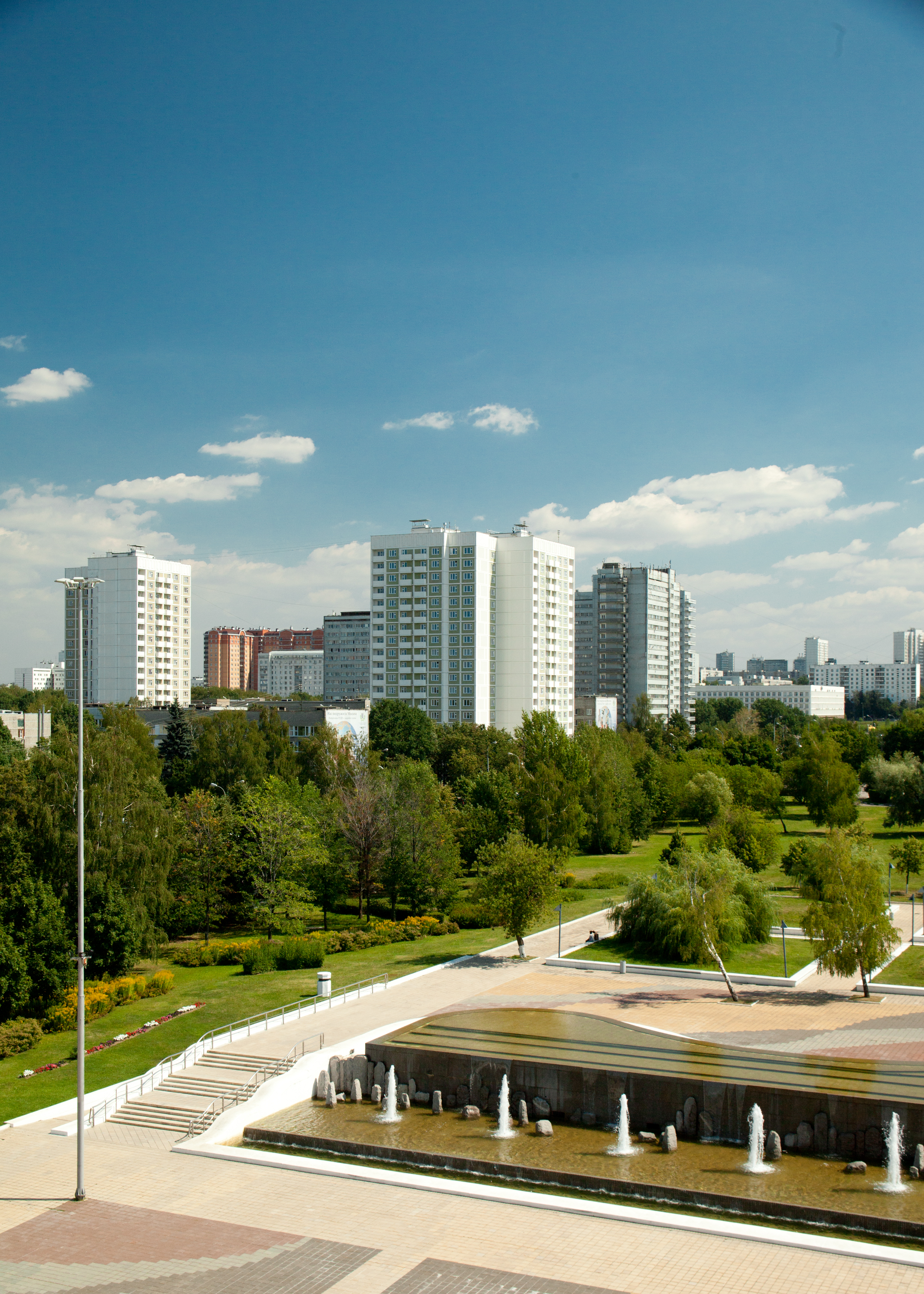
Student hostels of PFUR on Miklukho-Maklaya street

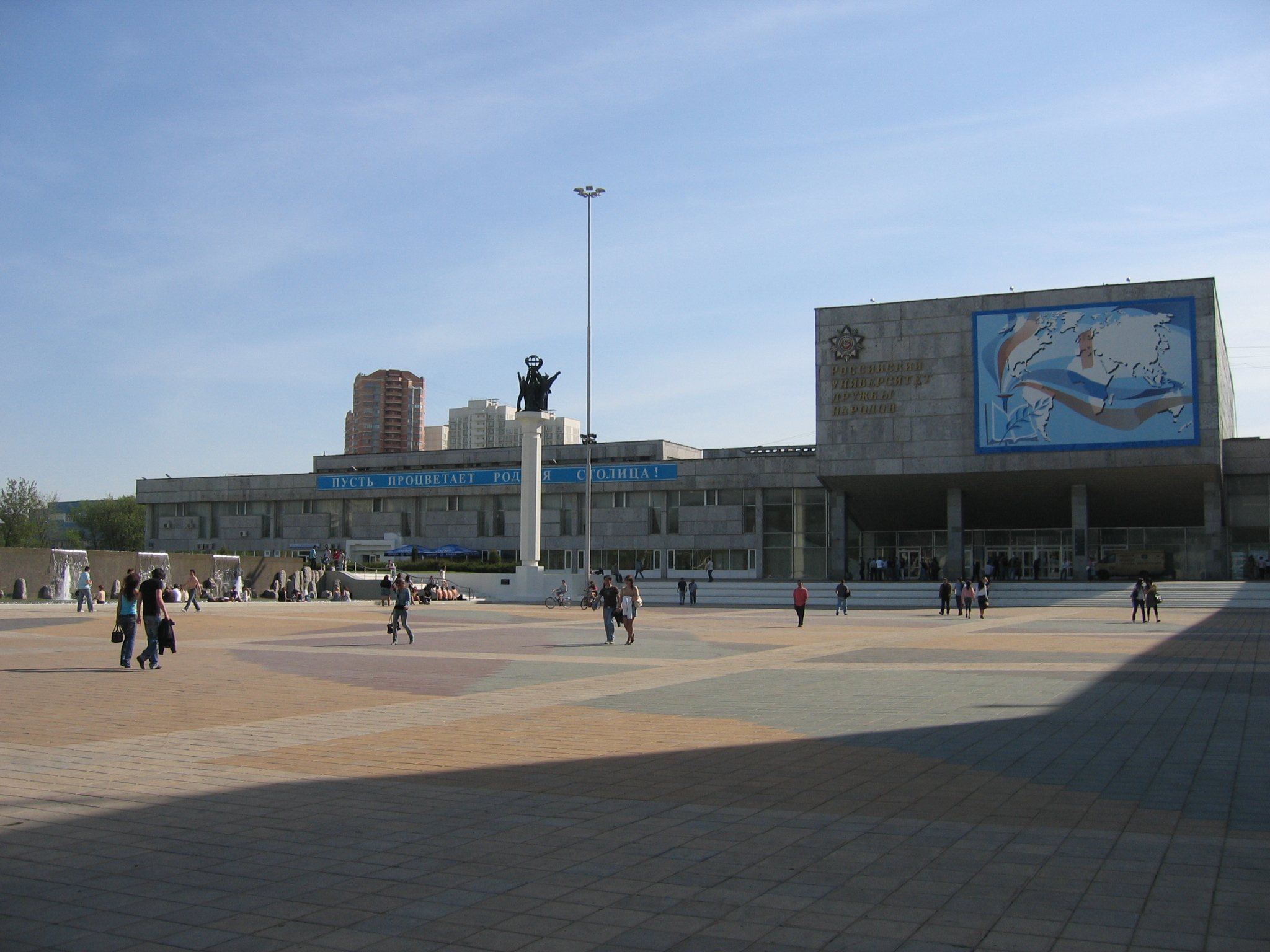
The Peoples' Friendship University of Russia's main building, 2007

- The main campus of PFUR is situated along Miklukho-Maklaya Street, starting from Leninsky Prospect in the direction of Volgina Street. On the even-numbered side, you can find: The main building of PFUR (called the "Cross"), buildings of the Faculties of Medicine and Agriculture, and also the sports complex, the polyclinic, the archives, and the new building of the Faculty of the Russian Language and general educational disciplines, the building of natural sciences and humanitarian faculties hosting the Faculty of Humanitarian and Social Sciences, the Institute of Hotel Business and Tourism (IHBT), the Institute for International Programs (IIP), and the Institute of Supplementary Professional Education's postgraduate department.
- The Engineering Academy and Faculty of Science campus are located at #3 Ordzhonikidze Street. The campus consists of several blocks, and the building at #3/4 Ordzhonikidze Street was built in 1913 by Boris Alberti. This is a former parochial secondary school with the church named after Duke Vladimir in 1913–19. The building at #3/1 Ordzhonikidze Street was built in 1930 and was the main house of the Military Academy of the General Staff of the Armed Forces of the USSR. The Engineering Academy and Faculty of Physical and Mathematical Sciences started to use this building complex in 1960.
- The campus of the Ecology Faculty is located at #8 Podol'skoe Street.
- The Faculty of Refresher Training for Health Care Professionals campus is located on Leninsky Avenue.

== Degrees offered ==
- Bachelor's degree (4 years of study)
- State Specialist degree (5 years of study)
- Medical Doctor degree (6 years of study)
- Master's degree (2 years of study following B.Sc.)
- Ph.D. (3 years after Masters or Specialist)
- D.Sc. (2–3 years after Ph.D.)
- Summer schools programs (Russian language learning; Short courses, different areas)

== Notable alumni ==
- Arul Pragasam, author, sustainability activist, and founding member of Tamil political group EROS.
- Rohana Wijeweera, Sri Lankan Marxist–Leninist political activist, revolutionary, and founder of the Janatha Vimukthi Peramuna (People's Liberation Front).
- Ali Khamenei, Supreme Leader of Iran
- Ilich Ramírez Sánchez (Carlos the Jackal), Venezuelan terrorist and assassin (expelled)
- Anna Chapman, Russian spy, media personality, and model
- Michel Djotodia, former President of the Central African Republic
- Vladimir Filippov, former Minister of Education and Science of Russia, current chancellor of the university
- Dieudonné Gnammankou, Beninean historian
- Mahmoud Abbas, Palestinian politician and leader of the Palestinian Authority
- Fatima Abdel Mahmoud, Sudanese politician, and leader of the Sudanese Socialist Democratic Union
- Irina Khakamada, economist, journalist, and politician
- Lucy Seki, Brazilian linguist
- Timoleón Jiménez, leader of FARC (expelled)
- Porfirio Lobo, former president of Honduras
- Daniel Ortega, president of Nicaragua
- Hifikepunye Pohamba, former president of Namibia from 2005 to 2015
- Alexei Navalny, lawyer, political and financial activist, and politician
- Bharrat Jagdeo, former president of Guyana
- Tamar Beruchashvili, Minister of Foreign Affairs, Georgia
- Jeanne d'Arc Mujawamariya, Minister of Environment, Rwanda
- Hillary Onek, Minister of Internal Affairs, Uganda
- Merlin Udho, educator and diplomat, Guyana
- Abed Elrahim Abu Zakrra, Sudanese writer and poet
- Youssouf Saleh Abbas, former Prime Minister of Chad
- Oburu Odinga, Youth leader, total orphan and Kenyan Senator in Siaya

== University people ==
- Viktor Alekseevitch Frolov (1936–2016), dean of the Medical Faculty, doctor, professor, academician, pathophysiologist and medical scientist

== See also ==
- International Lenin School
- Communist University of the Toilers of the East
- Communist University of the National Minorities of the West
- Moscow Sun Yat-sen University
- 2003 Peoples' Friendship University of Russia fire
