= Infomania =

Infomania is the debilitating state of information overload, caused by the combination of a backlog of information to process (usually in e-mail), and continuous interruptions from technologies like phones, instant messaging, and e-mail. It is also defined as an obsessive need to constantly check social media, online news, and emails to acquire knowledge. This may be related to a fear of missing out (FOMO).

== Origin of the term ==
To date, the term infomania is not used to refer to any recognized psychological disorder. Infomania is not generally recognized as causing significant impairment.

The term was coined by Elizabeth M. Ferrarini, the author of Confessions of an Infomaniac (1984) and Infomania: The Guide to Essential Electronic Services (1985). Confessions was an early book about life online. It was excerpted in Cosmopolitan in 1982.

== Effects ==
In 2005, Dr. Glenn Wilson conducted an experimental study which described effects of information overload on problem solving ability. The 80 volunteers carried out problem solving tasks in a quiet space and then while being bombarded with new emails and phone calls that they could not answer. Results showed a reduction in IQ by an average of 10 points during the bombardment session, but not everyone was affected to the same extent; men were distracted more than women. In 2010, Dr. Glenn Wilson published a clarifying note about the study in which he documented the limited size of the study and stated the results were "widely misrepresented in the media".

Wilson compares working while having an incoming of calls and email can reduce someone’s ability to focus as much as losing a night’s sleep. Not only can it affect one’s ability to function below their full potential at a job or in class, but it has been found that it can become addicting using technology as well. For example, how often have you found yourself on your phone checking work emails during a lunch with family on the weekend? This is just one of many examples of the addiction effect of infomania.

There have not been any long-term studies on the effects of infomania. However, Gloria Mark at UC Irvine conducted a study on the short-term effects of Fear of Missing Out, which involves compulsively checking in on the experiences of others via social media, and found that it took an average of 23 minutes to return to an original task after an interruption. She concluded that interruptions result in "more stress, higher frustration, time pressure and effort".

== See also ==
- Distraction
- Doomscrolling
- Information overload
- Personal Information Management
