= Infomania (Russian TV series) =

Infomania is a news programme broadcast in Russia on STS channel and begins a new day rather than summarizes the outgoing one. Infomania tells about the trends, shows tectonic shifts and the way how the world around them is evolving. The themes are: society, education, career, technology, science and media.

Infomania itself is a trendsetter in Russia. The program highlights topics and issues which for various reasons will be relevant for the Russian society in the near future but may already exist in other countries. Manufacturability and look of the future in Infomania is reflected not only in themes but in a format and visual solutions. The format is built on the principle of Wikipedia: block structure, the facts from the editors, expert opinion from specialists, the position of the columnists, related links.

== Topics ==
Global Topics that relate to all mankind and have a significant impact on the rating.

Public Topical, applied topics that are important for a significant proportion of residents of metropolis.

Future Classical subjects of the weekly program.

Entertainment Movies, bestsellers, exhibitions through the prism of cultural trends, trends in the entertainment business.

Anatomy Story about how things work, answers on questions, user-guides. They are linked to current information occasions.

The curiosity Funny news that also fit into the framework of trends. New funny Internet-heroes.

Ratings Ratings of three types:

== Generally recognized ratings ==
The most healthy national cuisines of the world, according to the Forbes magazine.

Ratings as a form of podachinabora interesting cases ilifaktov.

Ratings based on the methodology developed by Infomania, meaning those which are cited.
