= STS (TV channel) =

Russian TV channel (founded 1996)

STS СТС
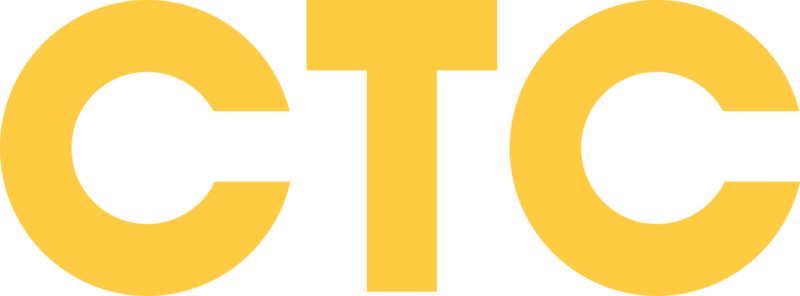
- Type: Free-to-air television network
- Country: Russia
- Headquarters: Moscow, Russia

Programming
- Language: Russian
- Picture format: HDTV 1080i SDTV 576i

Ownership
- Owner: CTC Media

History
- Launched: December 1, 1996; 29 years ago
- Former names: 1996–2000: STS-8; 2000–2009: STS-Moscow (in the capital city only); Since 1996: STS

Links
- Website: www.ctc.ru (Russia and Georgia only)

Availability

Terrestrial
- Digital terrestrial television: Channel 13

CTC (or STS, stands for Russian: Сеть Телевизионных Станций, Set Televizionnyh Stantsiy, lit. 'Network of television stations' (NTS)) is a commercial television station based in Moscow, Russia. It belongs to the CTC Media company. The company is owned by National Media Group (Russia) and VTB Bank (Russia).

== History ==
=== 1996—2002: Early Years of Broadcasting ===
The STS television network was founded by American entrepreneur Peter Gerwe, who was the first in the Russian market to propose a franchised network broadcasting model. In this model, independent affiliate broadcasters were responsible for distributing the television signal in the regions, receiving a portion of the channel's advertising time in exchange for their services. The idea of creating such a television network had been nurtured by the company StoryFirst Communications since 1993.

On December 1, 1996, the Moscow UHF channel AMTV, the St. Petersburg-based "Sixth Channel", the Nizhny Novgorod-based "Nika TV", the Kazan-based "Channel 6", and several regional television companies, which Gerwe and his financial partner Myron Wick developed using their own and borrowed funds, began joint broadcasting under the brand STS (which initially stood for "Commonwealth of Television Stations" and from 2002 onwards as "Network of Television Stations"). The launch of STS was initially planned for January, and later for October 1996, but financial and legal issues delayed it. In the first months of the channel's existence, the broadcast volume was only 9 hours per day, with the channel starting its broadcasts at 3:00 PM (on weekends) and 5:00 PM (on weekdays).

The fundamental differences between the STS network and TV-6 or AST-2x2 were: digital broadcasting across multiple time zones, the presence of a large amount of expensive foreign content for that time, and the absence of a broadcasting license — local television companies, which retransmitted STS, held such licenses in all broadcasting cities. For example, in Moscow, the license holder was LLC "Association Marathon-TV" (later — Media "Television Channel STS-8", Media "Television Channel STS-Moscow"), and in St. Petersburg — CJSC "Television Company Sixth Channel".

The first general director of the channel was Sergey Skvortsov. The famous television journalist Oleg Vakulovsky worked as the chief producer, and Vasily Kiknadze was the sports producer.

In September 1997, the channel changed its design. The first logo, which consisted of three semicircles, was replaced by a new logo featuring three three-dimensional letters "STS" with the letter "T" lying down. This logo was subsequently modified several times and remained in use until 2012.

In 1998, Roman Petrenko became the general director of STS. Under his leadership, by 1999, the channel's ratings approached those of the central television channels ORT, RTR, and NTV, while surpassing TV-6 and TV Center (in the first year of its existence, the channel's viewership was only 1%, which was significantly lower than that of NTV and TV-6).

In the early years, the channel's programming consisted mainly of foreign-produced television series ("Alf", "Dallas", "Beverly Hills, 90210", "Melrose Place", "The Wonders of Science", "Miami Vice", and others). There were also a small number of domestically produced programs; a well-known humorous project of STS at that time was "Beware, Modern!". The "Cinema at 9:00 PM" segment, which primarily broadcast foreign films, including blockbusters of category A, and a daytime block of cartoons (produced by "Soyuzmultfilm", "Walt Disney", "Warner Brothers", and other studios) were very popular.

From September 9, 2000, to August 24, 2002 (broadcasts in the USA from August 3, 2000, to July 11, 2002), STS aired the program "World Wrestling", which was a shortened 45-minute international version of the WWF/WWE SmackDown! show, with voice-over commentary by voice actors Vsevolod Kuznetsov and Alexander Novikov.

On August 27, 2000, due to the fire at the Ostankino Tower, around 4:20 pm Moscow time, the broadcast of the channel (in the "STS-Moscow" version, for Moscow and the Moscow region) was interrupted. The channel's broadcast in parts of Moscow resumed at 5:28 pm on September 5, 2000, thanks to the launch of a backup transmitter with a power of 200 W, obtained from Novocherkassk.

=== 2002–2008: The Era of Alexander Rodnyansky ===
By the early 2000s, STS's audience share under Roman Petrenko stabilized at around 5–6%. In 2001, STS ranked as Russia’s fifth most popular television channel, with an audience nearly equal to that of the meter-band channel TV-6. To further boost ratings STS, positioned as a youth channel since its inception with predominantly foreign content, aimed to reposition itself for family audiences and increase domestically produced programming.

Under new leadership, this transformation began: in 2002, STS underwent a management change, with Alexander Rodnyansky replacing Roman Petrenko as General Director, who radically overhauled programming strategy.

Rodnyansky assembled a creative team. Notably, Alexander Tsekalo significantly contributed to weekend programming during his tenure at STS from 2002 to 2007. The channel expanded its journalism offerings, introducing programs like Details hosted by Tina Kandelaki, Stories in Detail with Sergei Mayorov, and Cinema in Detail with Fyodor Bondarchuk. Entertainment shows like You’re a Supermodel and Life Is Beautiful, alongside the intellectual quiz The Smartest hosted by Kandelaki, gained popularity. Comedians such as Tatyana Lazareva and Mikhail Shats, known for TV-6's O.S.P. Studio and 33 Square Meters, moved to STS in 2002 with these projects. Later, Lazareva, Shats, and Alexander Pushnoy pioneered improvisational shows like Good Jokes and Thank God You're Here!.

During the Dubrovka theater siege on October 24, 2002, STS, under Rodnyansky's initiative, aired programming from the Echo-TV company (including Now in Russia and Sincerely Yours). Previously, the channel had avoided political content, positioning itself as purely entertainment-focused.

STS also prioritized serialized content. In fall 2003, STS launched a lineup of domestic TV series. The most successful included the historical drama Poor Nastya (Russia's first telenovela produced using Hollywood-style back-to-back filming), sitcoms My Fair Nanny and Who's the Boss?, dramedy Don't Be Born Beautiful, and adaptations of detective novels by Darya Dontsova (Dasha Vasilyeva: Amateur Sleuth) and Tatyana Ustinova (My Personal Enemy, The Myth of the Perfect Man). From this point, Russian series gradually displaced foreign shows in prime time, partly due to the latter's low ratings. By 2009, domestic series relegated Western shows to late-night and morning slots, including Grey's Anatomy, Charmed, Xena: Warrior Princess, The O.C., Smallville, The Big Bang Theory, and Nip/Tuck.

By 2002, STS was Russia's fourth most-watched channel. Until mid-2006, its ratings steadily rose, nearing those of the meter-band channel NTV. In 2005, STS achieved its highest-ever audience share of 10.3% (data for "Russia, All 4+"). However, from late 2006 to early 2008, STS experienced a decline, attributed to underperforming series like Petya the Magnificent, The Thirty-Somethings, and Heartbreakers.

=== 2008–2014. Vyacheslav Murugov's Tenure ===
On June 24, 2008, Alexander Rodnyansky left his position as the general director of CTC. In September, Vyacheslav Murugov was appointed as the new general director of the channel. The new leader adjusted CTC's target audience: between 2009 and 2012, the channel transitioned from a family-oriented concept to a family-and-youth focus. On January 1, 2013, CTC narrowed its target audience further (from the age group "6–54" to viewers aged "10–45").

In the early years of Murugov's leadership, CTC continued exploring genres like infotainment ("Infomania," "Big City," "Theory of Relativity," "InterNetwork"), and documentaries ("I Want to Believe!" and "History of Russian Show Business" hosted by Boris Korchennikov). However, over time, such projects ceased to be profitable. In 2009, "Stories in Details" aired for the last time (an updated version in 2011, "Details: Recent History," didn't last long). In 2012, "Infomania" and the quiz show "The Smartest" were canceled:

"With the program 'The Smartest,' an era of Rodnyansky on CTC ended in a certain sense. It was he who invented educational entertainment and promoted a range of projects that weren't just about entertainment but also something new, useful, interesting, and amazing."

— host of "The Smartest" Tina Kandelaki

The decline in interest in such projects was a result of ongoing channel segmentation at the time. This led to increased reliance on series and comedy programs. Between 2009 and 2011, CTC launched new high-rating projects: the comedy show "Ural Dumplings," the sketch comedy "Let's Give Youth a Chance!", the dramedy "Margosha," sitcoms "The Voronins" and "Traffic Light," and the mystery thriller "Closed School". In 2010–2011, the channel aired the show "Ukrainian Quarter" — a series of Russian concerts by the Ukrainian team from KVN, "95th Quarter," led by Volodymyr Zelenskyy — with CTC directly involved in organizing the shoots (though the show did not achieve high ratings). In 2012, "Good Jokes" ceased to exist, and soon after, Tatyana Lazareva and Mikhail Shats left the channel. Channel management did not disclose the reasons for their dismissal; according to Lazareva herself, her firing was linked to her "anti-Putin" sentiments and involvement in the Russian protest movement (2011–2013). Another possible reason for the dismissal could have been the low ratings of their recent projects. In 2012, the daytime block of cartoons was removed from the channel's broadcasting schedule (only the morning block remained). The reason for this was the decline in cartoon ratings on CTC due to the growing popularity of the broadcast channels "Carousel" and Disney, which drew away a portion of the children's and youth audience. However, even after 2012, CTC continued airing full-length animated films on weekends during daytime and evening hours.

In terms of series, Murugov gradually began to change the strategy: the channel started producing fewer adaptations and instead increased the number of original formats, which positively impacted ratings. Among the series launched in 2012–2013, the most popular were original productions: the sitcoms "The Eighties" and "Kitchen," the adventure comedy "While the Fern Blooms," and the sports drama "Youth".

Meanwhile, signs of a crisis became increasingly evident on the channel. Between 2006 and 2016, "CTC Media" was a public company, which made management prioritize business profitability above all else. Over time, content development took a backseat. As a result, this led to a decrease in the number of hits and the launch of some new projects of lower quality. Consequently, while the channel's share was 8.8% in 2009, by 2014 it had dropped to 5.8% (data for the audience "Russia, All 4+"). The decline began in mid-2010, and by the end of 2012, CTC dropped from fourth to fifth place in ratings among national channels, losing to TNT for the first time. Another reason for the decline in ratings was that Russian viewers gained access to an increasing number of channels, which contributed to a drop in audience share for major channels, including CTC.

In January 2011, the channel transitioned to 24/7 broadcasting (prior to this, since 2005, there were short technical breaks, approximately from 5:30 to 6:00).

In September 2012, the channel introduced a new logo, featuring a simple "CTC" inscription. This logo was subsequently modified several times.

On December 14, 2012, CTC joined the second multiplex of Russian digital television.

=== 2015–2022. Management Changes and Murugov's Return ===
Vyacheslav Murugov left his position as the general director of CTC. From January 1, 2015, to March 2016, Elmira Makhmutova held the position of general director. On March 10, 2015, the transformation of JSC "Network of Television Stations" into PJSC "CTC" was completed. On May 30, 2016, Vyacheslav Murugov returned as the general director, though all key management responsibilities for the channel were handed over to Daria Legoni-Fialko, who was appointed director of CTC on September 1, 2016.

By mid-2015, the decline in the channel's ratings had stopped, and during 2016–2017, CTC's audience slightly increased. This was partly due to the emergence of new hits—sitcoms like Hotel Eleon (a spin-off of Kitchen) and The Ivanovs-Ivanovs, produced by Yellow, Black and White.

Daria Legoni-Fialko refined the channel's concept: CTC would now clearly position itself as a "channel of romantic realism, for optimists and family viewing". To improve the quality of content, a transition to a new development strategy began—extending development timelines for TV projects (involving stricter control over scripts and the production of series and shows). Additionally, in December 2017, Art Pictures Distribution, an affiliated company, purchased a significant portion of Hollywood libraries from Warner Bros., MGM, Paramount, and Sony Pictures—this led to an increase in film premieres on CTC. According to Vyacheslav Murugov, strong film programming is "CTC's safety net," allowing for more freedom in experimenting with original productions.

From February to March 2018, CTC aired promotional segments where show hosts and actors encouraged viewers to participate in the presidential elections (without specifying whom to vote for), which was unprecedented since the channel's launch. Moreover, a special episode of the sitcom Voronins was filmed and aired multiple times, featuring numerous references to the elections.

Projects launched directly by Daria Legoni-Fialko's team (the musical show Success, the dramedy Psychologists, and others) did not resonate with audiences. Furthermore, at the end of 2017, the studio Yellow, Black and White ceased its collaboration with CTC, having created most of the channel's recent hits. According to some sources, the conflict between CTC and the studio arose due to Legoni-Fialko's actions. As a result, in April 2018, Daria Legoni-Fialko left CTC.

Since April 2018, Vyacheslav Murugov has been responsible for the channel's operational management, while Anton Fedotov, appointed as the general producer, oversees content production.

In 2018–2020, Sergey Svetlakov, Alexander Nezlobin, and Mikhail Galustyan released several comedy shows on CTC: the revived project Thank God You’re Here! and the new Russians Don’t Laugh. Mikhail Shats briefly returned to the channel, hosting the entertainment game show "It Happened in the Evening".

On February 1, 2019, the channel switched to a 16:9 broadcast format. In November 2019, the HD version of the channel launched.

By the end of 2019, CTC surpassed TNT in audience share and regained its leadership among Russian entertainment channels. Among the series launched in 2019–2022, the most notable were the sports comedy Tall Girls, the sci-fi comedy Guests from the Past, and the sitcoms Rodkom, Wife of an Oligarch, and Aunt Marta . Since 2020, the channel has also started airing internet series originally released on various online platforms (more.tv, Start, KinoPoisk, etc.): including the dramedy Chicks, the supernatural fantasy Food Block, the sitcom Grand (a spin-off of Hotel Eleon), and the sports drama Rugby. In 2021, CTC resumed its collaboration with Yellow, Black and White.

Simultaneously, CTC increased its production of entertainment shows. A revived Russian version of the adventure game show Fort Boyard was launched (hosted by Sergey Shnurov, later replaced by Sergey Burunov). The sports game show Russian Ninja (later Superninja) moved from Channel One to CTC.

== Russian series ==
STS airs both licensed series and sitcom: My Fair Nanny ("Моя прекрасная няня"), Not Born Beautiful ("Не родись красивой"), Voronin's Family ("Воронины"), Closed school ("Закрытая школа").

Among original Russian series and sitcoms: Poor Nastya ("Бедная Настя"), Cadets ("Кадетство"), Daddy's Daughters ("Папины дочки"), Ranetki ("Ранетки", dramedy about the same musical group – Ranetki Girls), Kitchen ("Кухня"), Eighties ("Восьмидесятые"), The Junior Team ("Молодёжка"), Two Fathers, Two Sons ("Два отца и два сына"), Londongrad ("Лондонград"), The Ivanovs vs. The Ivanovs ("Ивановы-Ивановы"), 90's. Fun and loud ("90-е. Весело и громко"), Aunt Martha ("Тётя Марта").

In the 2010s, the number of licensed series decreased. The management of the channel relies on original Russian projects.

== Foreign films ==
CTC Media maintains shows European and Hollywood films, including those from Disney (which also includes Pixar, Marvel, Lucasfilm, 20th Century Studios and Blue Sky Studios), Universal Pictures, Warner Bros., Paramount, Sony Pictures and others.

== Russian films ==
STS Media participated in the shooting and promotion of many Russian films: The 9th Company ("9 рота"), Piter FM ("Питер FM"), Heat ("Жара"), Dark Planet ("Обитаемый остров"), Hooked on the Game ("На игре"), All Inclusive ("All inclusive, или Всё включено"), The Kitchen in Paris ("Кухня в Париже"), Have Fun, Vasya! ("Гуляй, Вася!"), Kitchen. The Last Battle ("Кухня. Последняя битва"), Ice ("Лёд"), Yolki 7 ("Ёлки последние"), Invasion ("Вторжение"), Sputnik ("Спутник"), Cosmoball ("Вратарь Галактики"), Wish of the Fairy Fish ("По щучьему велению") and others.

== Russian shows ==
Among the most successful shows to have aired on the channel:

- comedy show – Good Jokes ("Хорошие шутки"), 6 frames ("6 кадров"), Thank God You're Here ("Слава Богу, ты пришел!"), You give the youth! ("Даёшь молодёжь!"), Ural Dumplings ("Уральские пельмени")
- entertainment show – Fort Boyard ("Форт Боярд"), Super Ninja ("Суперниндзя")
- infotainment – Galileo ("Галилео"), Movies in Details ("Кино в деталях"), Stories in Details ("Истории в деталях"), Infomania ("Инфомания")
- children's quiz show – The Cleverest ("Самый умный")
- style – What Not to Wear ("Снимите это немедленно"), Rogov. Studio 24 ("Рогов. Студия 24")

== Animation ==
Cartoons from the collections of the Walt Disney Company, Universal Studios, Warner Bros. Discovery, Paramount Global, and others, made up an important part of STS's programming in the past. The TV channel broadcast animated series such as Timon and Pumbaa, The Woody Woodpecker Show, TaleSpin, Tom and Jerry, Aladdin, The Real Ghostbusters, Winx Club, Scooby-Doo, DuckTales, Chip 'n Dale Rescue Rangers, Darkwing Duck, Merrie Melodies, Jackie Chan Adventures and others. In 2012, the morning block of cartoons was removed due to pressure from competing channels Carousel and Disney Channel.

Since the 2010s, STS has been producing its own animated series: Kid-E-Cats ("Три кота"), The Princesses ("Царевны"), Lex and Plu. Space Taxi Drivers ("Лекс и Плу. Космические таксисты") and others.

== Foreign series ==
In the 1990s and 2000s STS's programming mix included a wide variety of popular foreign series such as Charles in Charge, Quantum Leap, Sliders, Kommissar Rex, Beverly Hills, 90210, Melrose Place, Charmed, Smallville, Heroes, The O.C., Grey's Anatomy, Desperate Housewives, Nip/Tuck, Lizzie McGuire, Hannah Montana, Time Trax and Doctor Who.
