= Mia Boyka =

Russian singer (born 1997)

- Миа Бойка
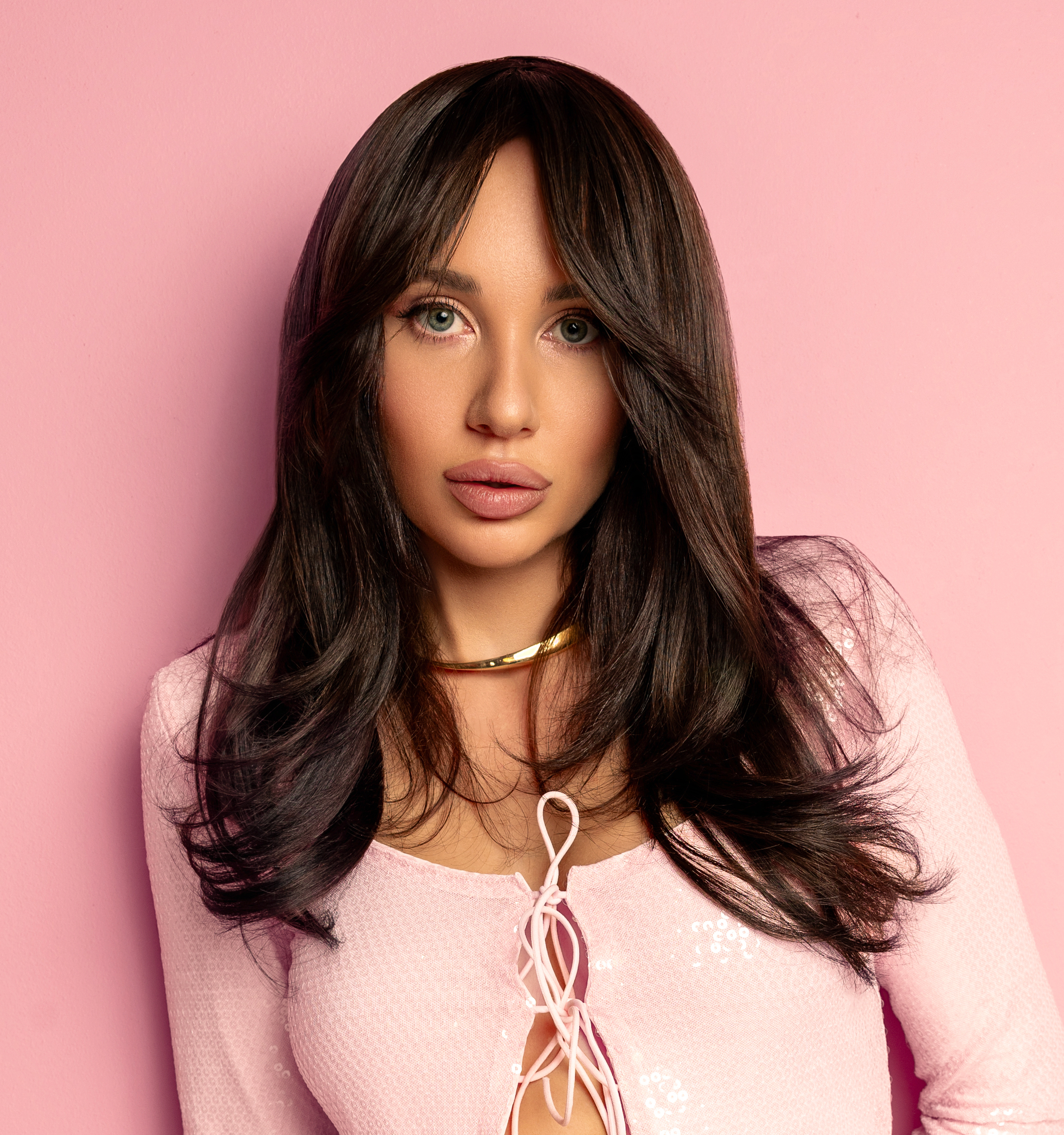
- Boyka in 2025
- Born: Maria Nikolaevna Boyko; 15 February 1997 (age 29); Zakhonye-2, Leningrad Oblast, Russia
- Education: Plekhanov Russian University of Economics
- Occupations: Singer; Influencer; TV presenter; Film actress
- Years active: 2019–present
- Notable work: "Pikachu"; "Bazovyy minimum"; "Eksponat"
- Website: miaboyka.ru

Maria Nikolaevna Boyko (Russian: Мария Николаевна Бойко, born 15 February 1997), known professionally as Mia Boyka, is a Russian singer, influencer, TV presenter and film actress.

She became famous primarily thanks to her activity on YouTube and TikTok. Winner of the Forbes 30 Under 30 Award in category "Music" in 2022. In 2026, her song "Bazovyy minimum" (recorded with Sabi) went viral on TikTok internationally.

== Early life ==
Boyko was born on 15 February 1997 in Zakhonye-2, a village in Leningrad Oblast, Russia. After graduating from high school, she enrolled at the Plekhanov Russian University of Economics in Moscow, to do a master's degree at the same faculty specialising in Management of Innovation and Entrepreneurship.

She has been writing songs since "her school days".

== Career ==
In 2019, she started working with a Russian rapper and music producer T-killah. They have released several tracks together, notably "Mama ne v kurse" and "Lod i noch'".

Mia Boyka gained fame primarily as a TikToker, becoming one of the most popular, influential and followed Russian personalities on the platform.

=== 2020–2022: First achievements ===
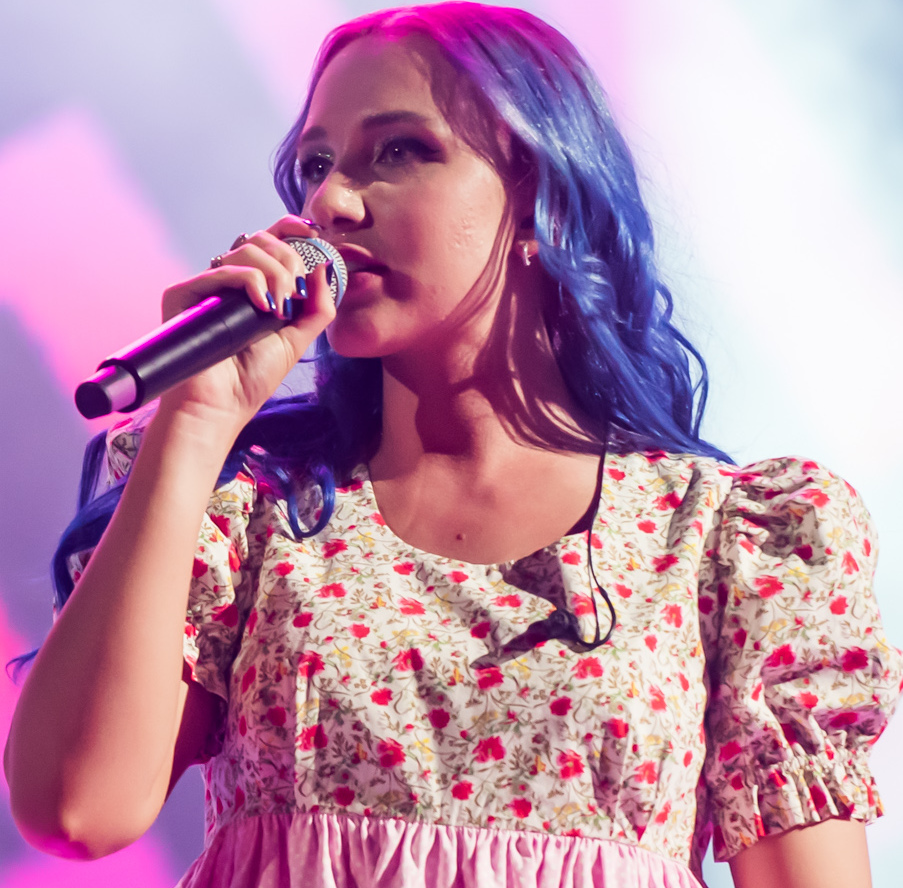
Boyka performing during White Nights Festival (2021)

Her 2020 song "Pikachu", a duet with Russian influencer Egor Ship, was among the five most-viewed music videos on YouTube in Russia that year, receiving almost 400 million views since its release.

In August 2021, Boyka's debut studio album Proshchal'nyy al'bom was released. It was positively received in a review by InterMedia's music critic Aleksej Mažaev.

She was nominated in the category "Discovery of the Year" at Premya Muz-TV music awards (in 2021) and in the category "Music Blogger" at the RU.TV music awards for two consecutive years (in 2021 and 2022).

In October 2022, she took part in the first season of the Russian sports and entertainment reality show Vyzov broadcast on the TNT channel.

In November 2022 she released single "Drama", which became her first radio hit in Russia, reaching the Top 40 of the TopHit's Radio Russia Weekly Chart. Additionally, the track also charted on the TopHit's airplay charts in Belarus, the CIS, Estonia, Kazakhstan, Latvia and Moldova.

The same year, she won in the category "Music" at the annual Forbes Russia under 30 ranking.

=== 2024: Moving towards a patriotic direction ===
On 18 January 2024, she released single titled "Russkoy pochodkoy", a song against russophobia whose cover features her wearing a fur hat with the Spasskaya Tower visible in the background.

In February, she was a contestant on the fifth season of the Russian version of the show The Masked Singer. She got eliminated in the sixth episode.

In May, she won her first two awards at Premya RU.TV music awards: one for the best cover thanks to her cover of the song "Ya eto ty", performed with Russian singer Sergey Lazarev at the Pod Shuboy 2 event hosted by VK, and the other one in category "Transformation of the Year".

On 31 May, she released "Bogatyrskaya", a track inspired by Tatiana Kurtukova's viral hit "Matushka", in which Boyka expresses her patriotism to Russia. On 11 June 2024, she performed that song at a concert to mark Russia Day in Red Square, Moscow.

On 31 August, her second album Narodnyy al'bom, featuring previously unreleased songs was released; the album featured a folk-pop style. The project was accompanied by an excerpt from "Krasiva i moloda", and was promoted by a concert at the Concert Hall in Moscow.

=== 2025–2026: Successive singles "Bazovyy minimum" and "Eksponat" ===
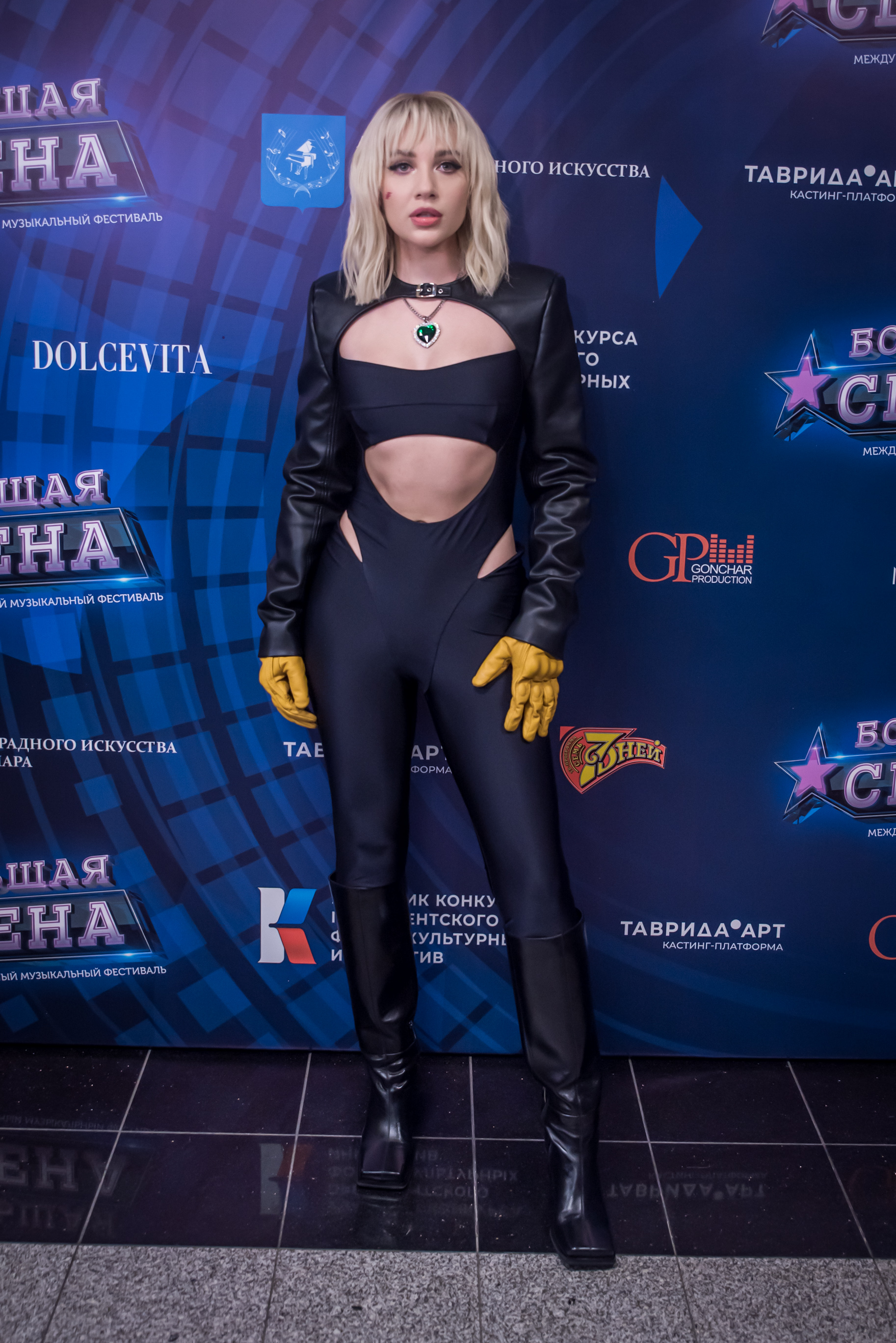
Mia Boyka attending Bolshaya Scena Music Festival on 9 October 2022

In 2025, she composed the soundtrack for the animated film Kapitany Budushchego: Kinokanikuly!.

Since 18 May 2025, alongside Alexey Vorobyov, she has been the presenter of the music show Perepoy zvezdu! shown on Channel One.

On 7 June 2025, Mia Boyka hosted the live show of Premya Muz-TV 2025 music awards, which took place at Live Arena.

In August 2025, she collaborated with Russian singer Sabi on the hit "Bazovyy minimum", which won in the category "Internet Hit of the Year" at Zhara Music Awards 2026, was nominated in the category "Best Collaboration" at Premya Muz-TV 2026 music awards and won in the category "Music Online" at Premya RU.TV 2026 music awards. The track peaked at number two on the TopHit's official Russian Streaming Chart and reached the top forty on AGATA's Singlų Top 100, the official streaming and radio chart of Lithuania.

From 14 September 2025, she has been a contestant on the reality show Dve zvezdy. Semeynyy podryad broadcast on Channel One, alongside her sister Elizaveta.

In the autumn of 2025, she took part in the Russian reality show Vyzhit' v Stambule.

On 15 May 2026, she released the single "Eksponat", which also went viral on TikTok and gained success abroad, reaching the top of the TopHit's Russian Streaming Chart, the top three of the LaIPA's official Latvian Streaming Chart, and the top twenty of AGATA's Singlų Top 100, the official streaming and radio chart of Lithuania.

According to the Russian state-controlled news site Gazeta.Ru, the song made Mia Boyka the female artist with the highest number of unique listeners in Russia and the CIS, as in June, she recorded over 12.5 million listeners across all of the streaming platforms available in the region.

In July 2026, "Bazovyy minimum" peaked at number 9 on the official streaming charts in India for international songs – IMI International Top 20 Singles. This is the second Russian song to chart there, after Instasamka with "Otklyuchayu telefon" in 2023.

== Controversy ==
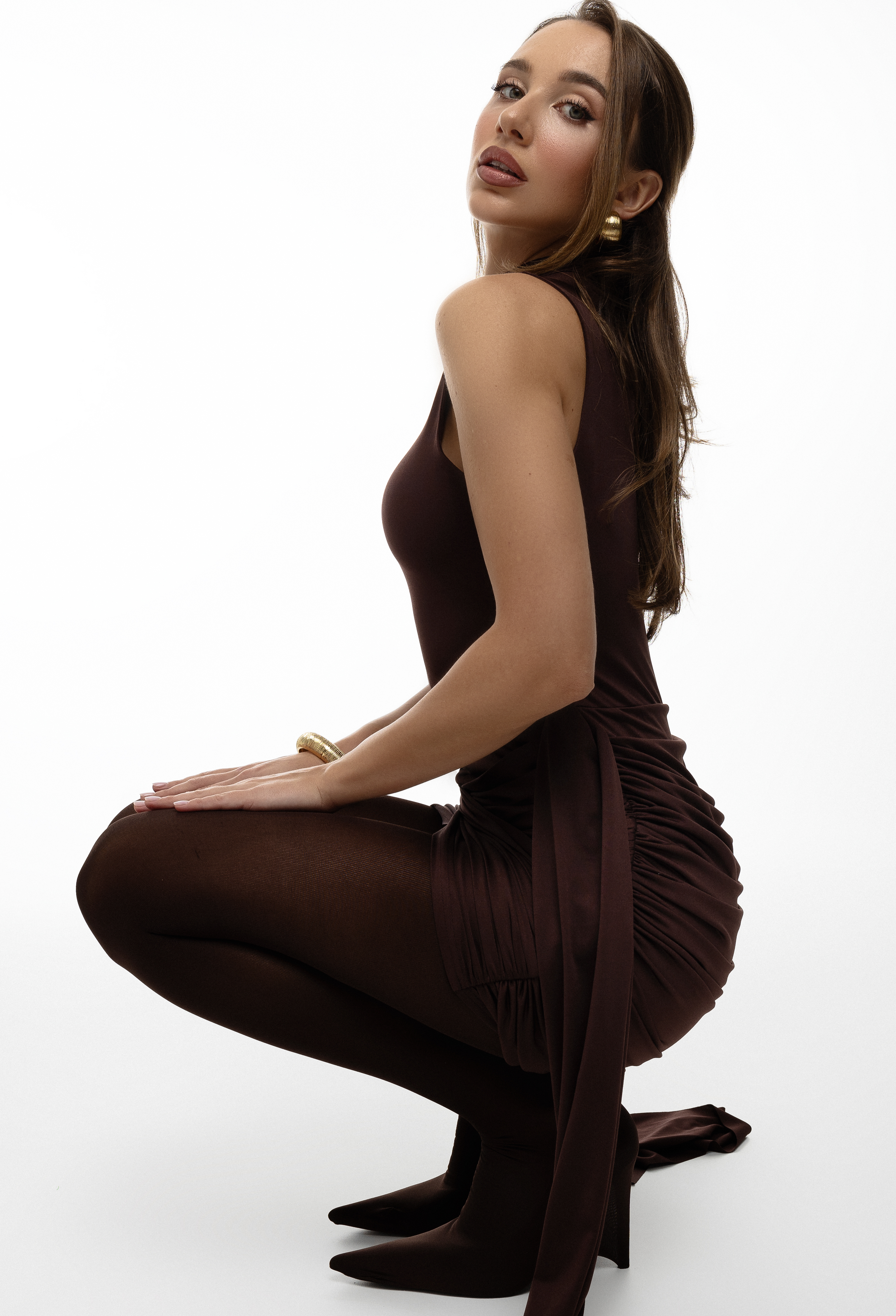
Boyka in December 2024

On 4 February 2022, she was added to the database of Ukrainian website Myrotvorets. The reason for her inclusion on the list was her participation in the Extreme festival, which took place in Crimea in 2020. The profile highlighted that Boyko had been involved in "attempts to legitimise the Russian occupation of Crimea".

In September 2024, she drew public attention and outrage after she posted a TikTok video of herself humiliating a little girl who was a quadrober at a concert in Nadym and inciting the audience to boo the lost eight-year-old to tears. After fans and child safety authorities scolded the singer for this, she avoided a scheduled public meeting with fans who had been waiting to see her, instead sneaking out a fire exit.

In June 2025, a 2024 clip from Boyka's appearance on the Russian stand-up comedy TV show Comedy Club went viral; in the video, the artist pretends to have slanted eyes, while talking about gaining fame from Chinese people. Women from Kazakhstan and Kyrgyzstan accused her of being racist and began a trend on TikTok, in which they are imitating Boyka's gesture and praise the beautiful shape of their eyes. At the end of June, the artist addressed the allegations and apologised for her behaviour, saying: "Whilst filming the show, I unfortunately did not realise that this gesture was offensive to Asian people, and if I offended or upset anyone with this gesture – which was, of course, not my intention – I sincerely apologise."

At the end of June 2025, during a concert in Vsevolozhsk, Boyka refused to accept a gift from a young fan – a Labubu plush toy. The artist explained that, in her opinion, they were "some sort of demons". She then added: "You can give me anything, even your bracelet; I'll wear it with pleasure. I don’t know if you have one or not. But these monsters… they’re terrifying; I'm afraid they will haunt me in my dreams. Basically, I wouldn’t advise anyone to buy them."

In July 2025, the artist sparked controversy after she addressed a man wearing a pink T-shirt during the music talent show Nasha novaya muzyka, saying: "On behalf of all women and men – please, for God's sake, don’t wear pink T-shirts. Pink is not a color for men." Host Yulianna Karaulova replied to Boyka, by reminding her that the show does not focus on fashion, but on singing. The participant wearing the T-shirt then began arguing with the singer. People on the internet criticised Boyka for wearing blue jeans at the same time, as they can be associated with men's clothing.

In early July 2026, during her concert in Naberezhnye Chelny, local blogger and comedian Vladislav Shunsky organised a flash mob, which involved man wearing pink T-shirts. Seeing hundreds of men taking part in the event, Boyka commented from the stage that she has changed her mind and it no longer bothers her: "Let men wear whatever they like; the main thing is that they love me and come to my concerts. If they are wearing pink T-shirts, and there are so many of them at the concert, I've got no objection." The artist then asked her musicians to put on pink T-shirts too.

== Political views ==
The singer holds pro-government views and actively supports the policies of Russia's current authorities; she spoke out in support of Vladimir Putin during the 2024 presidential election and confirmed she has voted for him. On 18 March 2024, she performed at a rally-concert marking the tenth anniversary of the annexation of Crimea and Putin's victory in the presidential election.

== Discography ==
=== Studio albums ===
List of studio albums, with selected details
Title	Details
Proshchal'nyy al'bom	Released: 27 August 2021; Label: Klever Label; Format: Digital download, streaming
Narodnyy al'bom	Released: 30 August 2024; Label: S&P Digital; Format: Digital download, streaming

=== Extended plays ===
List of extended plays, with selected details
Title	Details
Dikaya lamba	Released: 26 July 2019; Label: Klever Label; Format: Digital download, streaming
Moya zhizn' utekayet	Released: 17 April 2020; Label: Klever Label; Format: Digital download, streaming

=== Singles ===
==== As lead artist: 2019–2021 ====
List of 2019–2021 singles as lead artist, showing year released, chart positions and album name
Title	Year	Peak chart positions	Album or EP
Title	Year	RUS Air.	Album or EP
"My uletayem"	2019	—	Non-album singles
"Bablo"	2019	—	Non-album singles
"Za neonom"	2019	—	Non-album singles
"Dikaya lamba"	2019	—	Dikaya lamba
"Mama ne v kurse" (with T-killah)	2019	—	Dikaya lamba
"Mama ne v kurse" (with T-killah)	2019	—	Proshchal'nyy al'bom
"Lod i noch'" (with T-killah)	2019	—	Dikaya lamba
"Anatomiya"	2019	—	Dikaya lamba
"Ananas Adidas"	2019	—	Proshchal'nyy al'bom
"Rozovyye zvyozdy"	2019	—	Non-album singles
"Nayki strayki" (with T-killah)	2019	—	Non-album singles
"Mamba"	2020	—	Non-album singles
"Ok"	2020	—	Moya zhizn' utekayet
"Yedinorogi"	2020	—	Moya zhizn' utekayet
"Moya zhizn' utekayet"	2020	—	Moya zhizn' utekayet
"Ememdens"	2020	—	Proshchal'nyy al'bom
"Samuray" (Skazka Music Remix)	2020	—	Proshchal'nyy al'bom
"Pikachu" (with Egor Ship)	2020	147	Non-album single
"Pryatki"	2020	—	Proshchal'nyy al'bom
"Fendi Mood"	2020	—	Non-album singles
"Seryy Volk"	2020	—	Non-album singles
"Auf"	2020	—	Proshchal'nyy al'bom
"Snezhinka" (with Anya Pokrov)	2020	—	Proshchal'nyy al'bom
"Lepestok" (with T-killah)	2021	—	Proshchal'nyy al'bom
"Naruto" (with Egor Ship)	2021	—	Proshchal'nyy al'bom
"Begu po tropinke"	2021	—	Proshchal'nyy al'bom
"Mizinchik"	2021	—	Proshchal'nyy al'bom
"Alen'"	2021	—	Proshchal'nyy al'bom
"Morskoy boy"	2021	—	Non-album single
"Tantsy pod dozhdyem" (with Vanya Dmitrienko)	2021	—	Proshchal'nyy al'bom
"Ma Ma Ma" (with Sevenn)	2021	—	Non-album singles
"Kapkan (Volshebnaya Ariel')" (with Konfuz)	2021	—	Non-album singles
"—" denotes items which were not released in that country or failed to chart.

==== As lead artist: 2022–2024 ====
List of singles released from 2022 to 2024 as lead artist, showing year released, chart positions and album name
Title	Year	Peak chart positions								Album or EP
Title	Year	RUS Air.	BLR Air.	CIS Air.	EST Air.	KAZ Air.	LAT Air.	LTU Air.	MDA Air.	Album or EP
"Vdokh"	2022	—	—	—	—	*	—	—	*	Non-album singles
"Gagarin"	2022	136	—	—	—	*	—	—	*	Non-album singles
"Salamandra" (with T-killah)	2022	—	—	—	—	*	—	—	*	Non-album singles
"Vysoko"	2022	—	—	—	—	*	—	—	*	Trudnyye podrostki (soundtrack)
"Drama"	2022	33	84	51	28	72	20	—	10	Non-album single
"Plakat' v Porshe"	2023	—	96	—	23	127	—	5	—	Non-album single
"Letom na 42" (with Elsea)	2023	—	—	—	—	—	—	—	—	Non-album single
"Mnogo li nas" (with Lepnina)	2023	—	—	—	—	—	4	—	—	Non-album single
"Ya ne takaya"	2023	—	—	—	46	—	—	—	—	Non-album single
"Vse ponyatno"	2023	—	—	—	162	—	62	—	—	Non-album single
"Sirop"	2023	—	—	—	—	—	—	—	—	Non-album single
"Prosto"	2023	—	—	—	97	—	—	—	—	Non-album single
"Vrangel' ne vral"	2023	—	—	—	—	—	65	—	—	Non-album single
"Russkoy pochodkoy"	2024	—	—	—	—	—	—	—	—	Non-album single
"Navigator"	2024	—	—	—	114	—	—	6	—	Non-album single
"Pomada na shcheke" (with Mikhail Shufutinsky)	2024	29	—	49	80	—	—	—	—	Non-album single
"K luchshemu" (with Lesha Svik)	2024	—	—	—	—	—	—	—	—	Non-album single
"Papa" (with Havva)	2024	—	—	—	—	—	—	—	—	Non-album single
"Bogatyrskaya"	2024	—	—	—	—	—	—	—	—	Narodnyy al'bom
"Krasiva i moloda"	2024	—	—	—	—	—	—	—	—	Narodnyy al'bom
"A on takoy"	2024	—	—	—	—	—	—	—	—	Narodnyy al'bom
"Otpuskayu"	2024	—	—	—	—	—	—	—	—	Narodnyy al'bom
"Yest' u berega reka"	2024	—	—	—	—	—	—	—	—	Narodnyy al'bom
"Kazat'sya glupoy"	2024	—	—	—	—	—	—	—	—	Non-album singles
"Chernaya Lada"	2024	—	—	—	—	67	—	—	—	Non-album singles
"Bliki"	2024	—	—	—	—	—	—	—	—	Non-album singles
"—" denotes items which were not released in that country or failed to chart. "*" denotes that the chart did not exist at that time.

==== As lead artist: since 2025 ====
List of singles released since 2025 as lead artist, showing year released, chart positions and album name
Title	Year	Peak chart positions									Album or EP
Title	Year	RUS Air.	RUS Stream.	BLR Air.	CIS Air.	KAZ Air.	IND Int.	LAT Air.	LAT Stream.	LTU	Album or EP
"Mosya"	2025	—	*	—	—	—	—	—	—	—	Non-album singles
"Snova dozhd'"	2025	36	*	—	64	84	—	—	—	—	Non-album singles
"Betmobil'"	2025	—	—	—	—	—	—	—	—	—	Non-album singles
"Izumrud"	2025	—	—	—	—	—	—	—	—	—	Non-album singles
"Afrodita"	2025	—	—	—	—	—	—	—	—	—	Non-album singles
"Bazovyy minimum" (with Sabi)	2025	—	2	171	—	—	9	—	—	34	Bazovyy minimum
"Akh ty step' shirokaya" (with Misha Marvin)	2025	—	—	—	—	—	—	—	—	—	Non-album singles
"Izvinis'"	2025	—	—	—	—	—	—	—	—	—	Non-album singles
"Ya samaya"	2025	—	11	—	—	—	—	—	—	—	Non-album singles
"Okak"	2025	—	—	—	—	—	—	—	—	—	Non-album singles
"Khochet ochen'"	2026	—	—	—	—	—	—	—	—	—	Non-album singles
"Pervaya"	2026	—	86	—	—	—	—	—	—	—	Non-album singles
"Kleopatra"	2026	—	—	—	—	—	—	—	—	—	Non-album singles
"Kazak"	2026	187	—	—	—	—	—	—	—	—	Non-album singles
"Eksponat"	2026	125	1	—	161	9	—	18	3	15	Non-album singles
"Prime"	2026	—	29	—	—	—	—	—	—	—	Non-album singles
"U menya vso yest'"	2026	—	—	—	—	—	—	—	—	—	Non-album singles
"Luchsheye dlya menya" (with Liza Boyka)	2026	—	83	—	—	—	—	—	—	—	Non-album singles
"—" denotes items which were not released in that country or failed to chart. "*" denotes that the chart did not exist at that time.

=== Promotional singles ===
==== As lead artist ====
List of promotional singles as lead artist, showing year released, chart positions and album name
Title	Year	Peak chart positions	Album
Title	Year	LAT Air.	Album
"Ya eto ty" (with Sergey Lazarev)	2024	—	Non-album single
"Kaby ne bylo zimy"	2025	75	Prostokvashino (soundtrack)
"Eksponat (Remix)"	2026	74	Non-album single
"—" denotes items which were not released in that country or failed to chart.

==== As featured artist ====
List of promotional singles as featured artist, showing year released, chart positions and album name
Title	Year	Album
"Fioletovo" (Nastya Kravchenko featuring Mia Boyka)	2023	Zaletay v trendy (soundtrack)
"Ne napisal" (Danzo&Shanti featuring Mia Boyka)	2023	Zaletay v trendy (soundtrack)
"Little Boy" (Alexey Tavleev featuring Mia Boyka)	2023	Zaletay v trendy (soundtrack)
