= Shyolk =

2025 single by Vanya Dmitrienko

Single by Vanya Dmitrienko
- Language: Russian
- English title: Silk
- Released: 18 July 2025
- Genre: Pop, Pop rock
- Length: 2:26
- Label: Zion Music
- Songwriters: Ivan Viktorovich Dmitrienko; Denis Vitalyevich Vlasov; Maksim Igorevich Zaytsev; Matvey Dmitriyevich Vetrov; Vadim Eduardovich Kim
- Producers: Denis Vitalyevich Vlasov; Maksim Igorevich Zaytsev; Matvey Dmitriyevich Vetrov; Vadim Eduardovich Kim

Vanya Dmitrienko singles chronology
"Nastoyashchaya" (2025)	"Shyolk" (2025)	"Siluet" (2025)

Music video
- "Shyolk" on YouTube

"Shyolk" (Russian: Шёлк, lit. 'Silk') is a song by a Russian singer Vanya Dmitrienko. It was released on 18 July 2025 by Zion Music. The song topped official streaming chart in Russia. Outside of Russia, "Shyolk" also peaked within the top twenty of the airplay charts in countries such as Kazakhstan, Latvia, Lithuania and Moldova.

== Background ==
The singer himself described the song on his social media: "It's about the fear of loss, the fleeting nature of time, and the insatiable desire to be there for each other. It's about when one person completely trusts another. It's about eyes filled with admiration. In short, it's a song about very intense feelings."

According to Marina Grinwald from the Russian edition of magazine Psychologies, the song tells the story of how a young man, despite his beloved's coldness and his own fear of loss, overcomes all obstacles and experiences to find his love. The song according to her interpretation is about overcoming obstacles, how one person's confidence in a relationship reveals deep feelings and a genuine connection in the other person, which can last a lifetime and bring happiness.

== Critical reception ==
According to the Russian news website Pravda.ru, the song "won the hearts of listeners and became one of the hits of the year."

== Preview video ==
Dmitrienko's back then alleged girlfriend, Russian actress Anna Peresild plays the lead role in the preview video of the song.

== Notable live performances ==
On September 26, 2025 Dmitrienko performed the song during Zhivoy Zavtrak live concert hosted by radio Europa Plus.

On October 14, 2025, he performed the song at VTB Arena in Moscow following a friendly match between the national football teams of Russia and Bolivia.

On October 31, 2025, the artist performed the song during a guest appearance in episode eight of the seventh season of Nu-ka, vse vmeste!, the Russian version of the reality television singing competition All Together Now, which aired on Russia-1.

== Commercial performance ==
In Russia, the song immediately week after its release debuted on TopHit's Russian airplay chart at number 95, on the chart dated 31 July 2025. It eventually peaked on this chart at number 6 on week dated 11 September. In the TopHit's Russian streaming chart, the song reached number one in the chart published on 28 August, and remained in that place the following seven weeks, dated 4, 11, 18, 25 September, 2, 9 and 16 October. In Commonwealth of Independent States, the song debuted at number 35 on TopHit's Commonwealth of Independent States Airplay chart dated 14 August. It eventually peaked at number 14, on chart dated 4 September. In Belarus, the song debuted at number 46 on TopHit's Belarusian Airplay chart, at the week dated 11 September. It eventually peaked there at number 22, at the week dated 6 March 2026. In Kazakhstan, the song debuted at number 70 on TopHit's Kazakh Airplay chart, at the chart dated 14 August. It peaked there at number 20, on the chart dated 13 November. In Latvia, the song debuted at number 28 on TopHit's Latvian Airplay chart, on the chart dated 25 September. It eventually peaked here at number 13, at the following week dated 9 October. In Lithuania, the song debuted at number 24 on TopHit's Lithuanian Airplay chart, on the chart dated 2 October. It eventually peaked here at number 13, at the following week dated 9 October. In Moldova, the song debuted and peaked in the Top 100 of TopHit's Moldovan Airplay chart at number 18, on the chart dated 6 February 2026.

At the end of August 2025, the song topped the charts published by the Russian streaming service Yandex Music.

== Charts ==
=== Weekly charts ===
Weekly chart performance for "Shyolk"
Chart (2025–2026)	Peak position
Belarus Airplay (TopHit)	22
CIS Airplay (TopHit)	14
Kazakhstan Airplay (TopHit)	20
Latvia Airplay (TopHit)	13
Lithuania Airplay (TopHit)	13
Moldova Airplay (TopHit)	18
Russia Airplay (TopHit)	6
Russia Streaming (TopHit)	1

=== Monthly charts ===
Monthly chart performance for "Shyolk"
Chart (2025–2026)	Peak position
Belarus Airplay (TopHit)	24
CIS Airplay (TopHit)	18
Kazakhstan Airplay (TopHit)	26
Latvia Airplay (TopHit)	19
Lithuania Airplay (TopHit)	37
Moldova Airplay (TopHit)	41
Russia Airplay (TopHit)	5
Russia Streaming (TopHit)	1

=== Year-end charts ===
Year-end chart performance
Chart (2025)	Position
Belarus Airplay (TopHit)	137
CIS Airplay (TopHit)	79
Latvia Airplay (TopHit)	125
Russia Airplay (TopHit)	45
Russia Streaming (TopHit)	34

=== Decade-end charts ===
20s Decade-end chart performance
Chart (2025–2026)	Position
Russia Streaming (TopHit)	8
