= Siluet =

2025 single by Vanya Dmitrienko and Anna Peresild

Single by Vanya Dmitrienko and Anna Peresild

from the album Alice in Wonderland (soundtrack)
- Language: Russian
- English title: Silhouette
- Released: 10 October 2025
- Genre: Pop, pop rock
- Length: 2:29
- Label: Zion Music
- Songwriter: Ivan Viktorovich Dmitrienko
- Composers: Ivan Viktorovich Dmitrienko; Denis Vitalyevich Vlasov; Maksim Igorevich Zaytsev; Matvey Dmitriyevich Vetrov; Vadim Eduardovich Kim

Vanya Dmitrienko singles chronology
"Shyolk" (2025)	"Siluet" (2025)	"Ladoni" (2025)

Music video
- "Siluet" on YouTube

"Siluet" (Russian: Силуэт, lit. 'Silhouette') is a song by a Russian singer Vanya Dmitrienko and Russian actress Anna Peresild recorded as the soundtrack to the film Alice in Wonderland (2025), where Peresild plays the main role. The song was released on 10 October 2025 by Zion Music. It topped official streaming chart in Russia. "Siluet" also peaked within the top ten of the airplay and streaming charts in Latvia, and within the top forty of the airplay charts in Russia, CIS, Kazakhstan and Moldova.

== Background ==
The two have collaborated twice before; Anna played the lead role in preview videos for two of Dmitrienko's singles – "Tsvetayeva" and "Shyolk".

Dmitrienko said about the song: "It's a song filled with feelings, longing, and yearning. I wrote it with great trepidation and am incredibly happy that it came to be. I hope you find yourself in the lyrics. Many people were waiting for our duet, and I think it came at just the right time. Every song that comes out is like a whole life for me. So many ideas, shoots, processes. I am incredibly happy that we made it with Anya. Her tenderness is perfect in these lyrics."

According to Marina Grinwald from the Russian edition of magazine Psychologies, the song "tells an unusual story of love, when people are physically absent from each other but present on a metaphysical level. [...] The song tells the listener that it is impossible to resist true passion and love. The mutual attraction between the author and the heroine is so great that, even when they are not together, they can feel each other's presence."

== Commercial performance ==
In Russia, the song debuted on TopHit's Russian airplay chart at number 74, on the chart dated 30 October 2025. It eventually peaked on this chart at number 29 on week dated 30 January 2026. In the TopHit's Russian streaming chart, the song immediately week after its release debuted at number three in the chart published on 16 October. One week later, the song managed to reach number one, and remained in that place for another week, dated October 30. In Commonwealth of Independent States, the song debuted at number 92 on TopHit's Commonwealth of Independent States Airplay chart dated 6 November. It eventually peaked at number 39, on chart dated 30 January 2026. In Latvia, the song debuted and peaked at number 8 on LaIPA's Streaming Chart dated 20 October, while on TopHit's Latvian Airplay chart the single debuted at number 38 on the chart dated 23 October. It eventually peaked there at number 2, at the week dated 20 March 2026. In Moldova, the song debuted at number 37 on TopHit's Moldovan Airplay chart dated 6 November. It eventually peaked there at number 27, at the week dated 16 January 2026. In Kazakhstan, the song debuted at number 32 on TopHit's Kazakh Airplay chart dated 23 January 2026. It eventually peaked next week at number 23, on the chart dated 30 January 2026.

The song set a new record for streaming pre-saves and was recognized as the Most Anticipated Release of 2025 on the Russian streaming platform Yandex Music.

== Accolades ==
Awards and nominations for "Siluet"
Organization	Year	Category	Result	Ref.
Yandex Music: Year in Review	2025	Most anticipated release	Won	
Premya Muz-TV 2026. Dvizheniye	2026	Best collaboration	Won	

== Charts ==
=== Weekly charts ===
Weekly chart performance for "Siluet"
Chart (2025–2026)	Peak position
Belarus Airplay (TopHit)	130
CIS Airplay (TopHit)	39
Kazakhstan Airplay (TopHit)	23
Latvia Airplay (TopHit)	2
Latvia Streaming (LaIPA)	8
Moldova Airplay (TopHit)	27
Russia Airplay (TopHit)	29
Russia Streaming (TopHit)	1

=== Monthly charts ===
Monthly chart performance for "Siluet"
Chart (2025–2026)	Peak position
CIS Airplay (TopHit)	50
Kazakhstan Airplay (TopHit)	59
Latvia Airplay (TopHit)	5
Moldova Airplay (TopHit)	31
Russia Airplay (TopHit)	35
Russia Streaming (TopHit)	2

=== Year-end charts ===
Year-end chart performance
Chart (2025)	Position
Russia Streaming (TopHit)	92

=== Decade-end charts ===
20s Decade-end chart performance
Chart (2025–2026)	Position
Russia Streaming (TopHit)	24
