= Vanya Dmitrienko =

Russian singer (born 2005)

- Ваня Дмитриенко
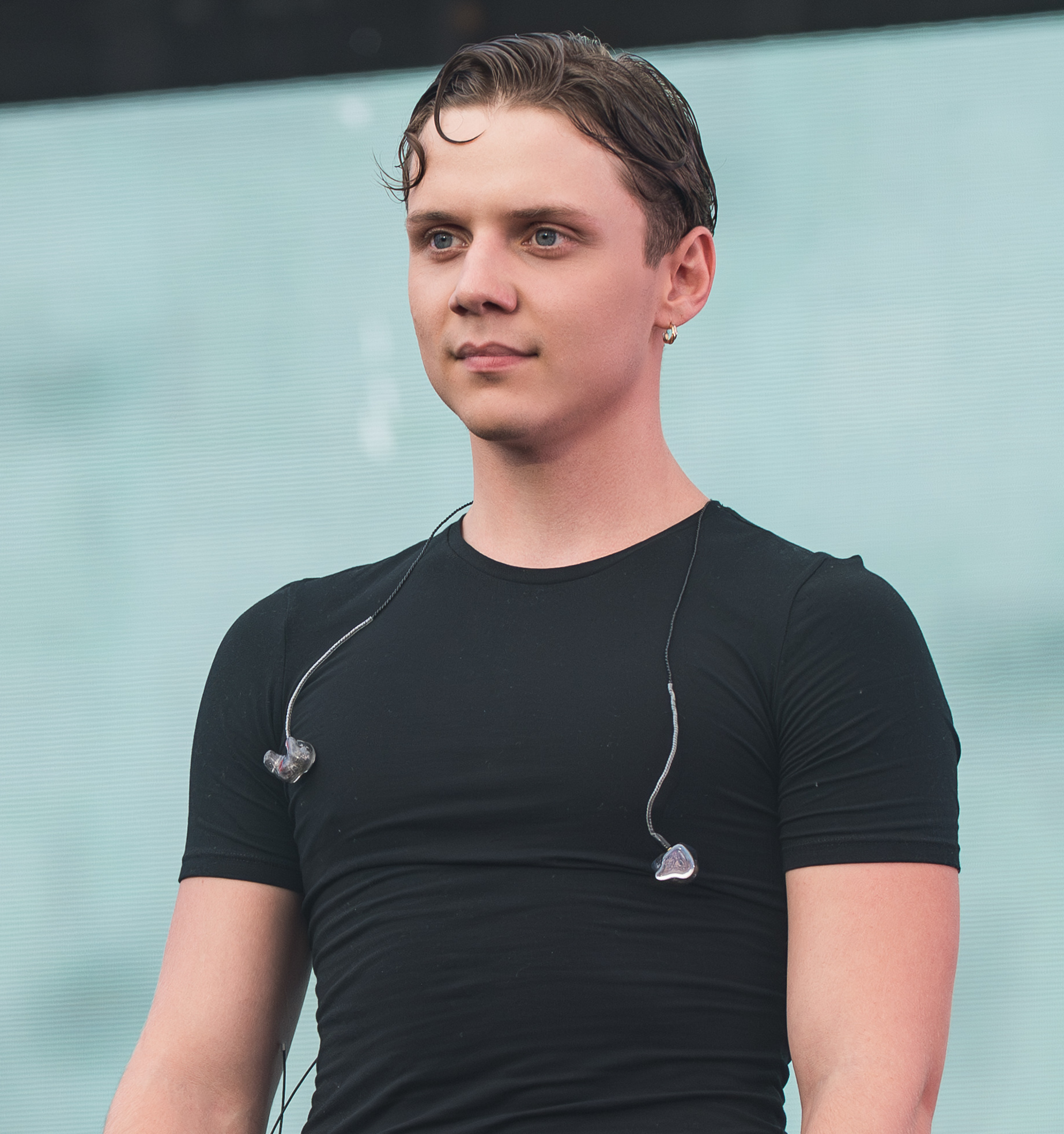
- Dmitrienko in 2025
- Born: Ivan Viktorovich Dmitrienko; October 25, 2005 (age 21); Krasnoyarsk, Russia
- Partner(s): Sasha Ice (2021–2024); Anna Peresild (2025–present)
- Musical career
- Genres: Pop; pop-rock
- Occupations: Singer; songwriter; actor
- Instruments: Vocal, guitar
- Label: Zion Music
- Website: https://vanyadmitrienko.ru/

Signature
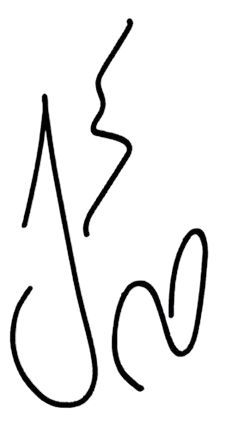

Ivan Viktorovich Dmitrienko (Russian: Иван Викторович Дмитриенко; born 25 October 2005), known professionally as Vanya Dmitrienko (Russian: Ваня Дмитриенко) is a Russian singer, songwriter and actor. Winner of the Forbes 30 Under 30 Award in category "Music" in 2023.

He became known in Russia after releasing the song titled "Venera-Yupiter" in January 2021. In 2025, his singles "Shyolk" and "Siluet" topped the official Russian streaming chart. His other popular songs include "Pizza" and "Ne predstavlyayesh", the latter one recorded with Russian band 5utra.

== Biography ==
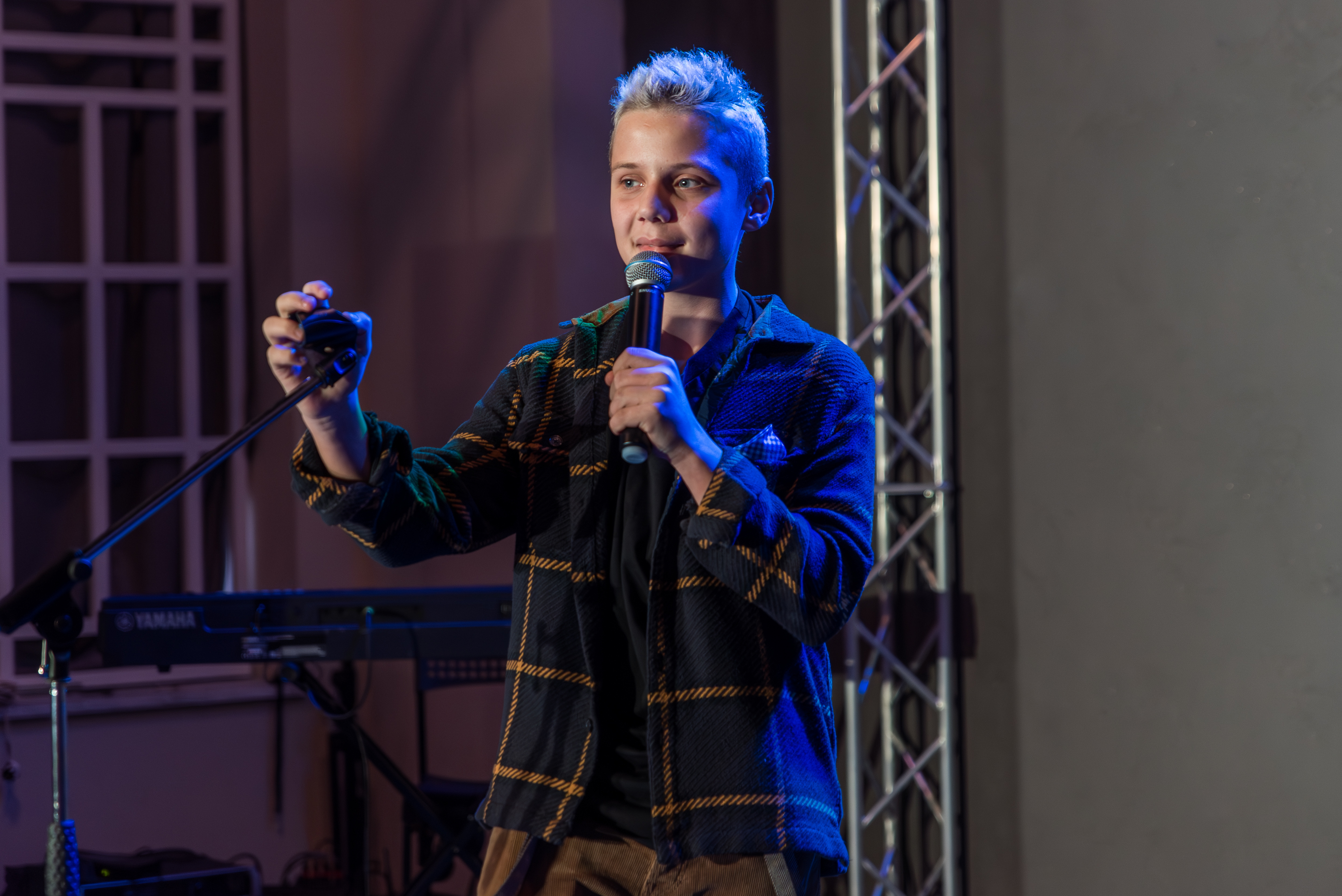
Dmitrienko during Territoriya uspekha Festival (2018)

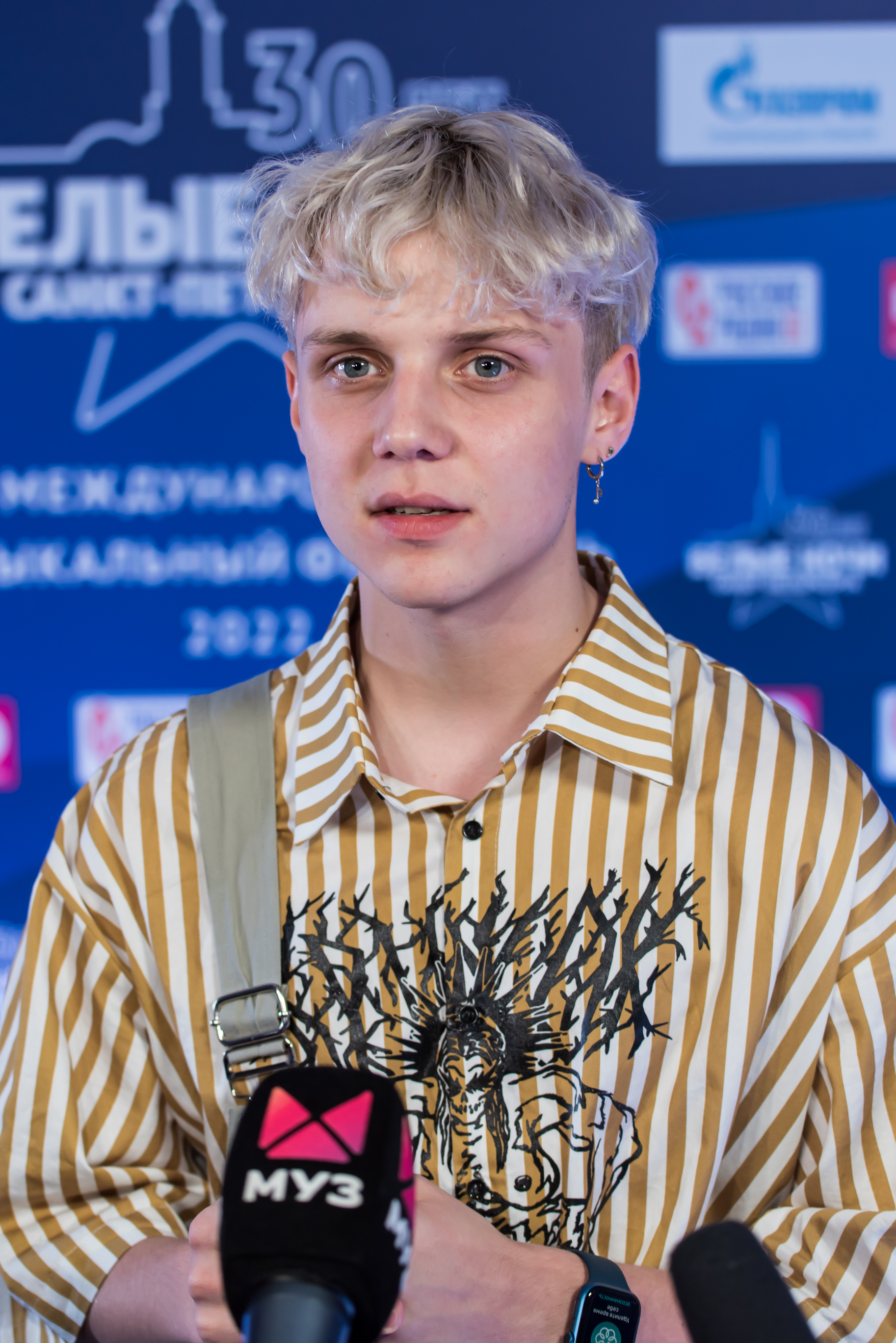
Dmitrienko during White Nights Festival (2022)

Vanya Dmitrienko was born on 25 October 2005 in Krasnoyarsk, Russia. As a child, he studied vocals with a teacher as well as in the theater Etti Deti. When he was 13 years old, he moved with his mom to Moscow, Russia.

In 2020, Dmitrienko took part in the project Khochu s Open Kids. He became one of the three winners on the show. In June the same year, he published a music video for the song "Otvet mne". In the summer of 2020, he signed a contract with the Russian music label Zion Music.

In 2021, Vanya's cover of a song by the group t.A.T.u. was included in their official tribute album 200 Po Vstrechnoy. The same year, he became one of the guests at White Nights Festival, which took place on the nights of June 25 and 26.

In the same year, he received Golden Gramophone Award, also being the youngest artist to receive the win in the whole history of the award.

On 1 January 2022 release on Channel One during the New Year's show Ciao, 2021! under the name Giovanni Demetrio, he sang the song "Venere-Urano" (a special remake of "Venera-Yupiter").

In 2022, he participated in the 13th season of the celebrity talent show Tantsy so zvyozdami, Russian version of Strictly Come Dancing.

On 17 February 2023, he released his debut album titled Paranoik.

From February to March 2023, Dmitrienko was a participant of the fourth season of the show The Masked Singer under the pseudonym Raven.

In May 2023, Dmitrienko was included at Forbes 30 Under 30 in the category of Music, where he was the youngest person in that category, at the age of 17.

In October 2024, he became a model for rapper Kanye West's new Yeezy collection.

In 2025, he was named Artist of the Year by Yandex Music: Throughout 2025, Dmitrienko's tracks were the most streamed on the platform, with his total audience exceeding 19 million users. Additionally, his duet single "Siluet" recorded with Anna Peresild set a new record for streaming pre-saves and was recognized as the Most Anticipated Release of 2025 on the platform.

On 2 August 2026, Dmitrienko performed a solo concert at Luzhniki Stadium, which – according to media reports, was attended by approximately 70,000 spectators. Immediately after the show ended, Stanislav Konenko, editor-in-chief of the Russian Book of Records, officially recognized the achievement, declaring the singer the youngest artist in the country’s history to have performed a sold out solo concert at that venue. At the time the record was set, Dmitrienko was 20 years, 9 months, and 8 days old.

== Personal life ==
From 2021 to 2024, he dated Russian influencer and singer Sasha Ice. In November 2024, the couple broke up.

On 25 October 2025, Dmitrienko confirmed in a joint interview with Russian actress Anna Peresild that they are dating.

== Discography ==
=== Studio albums ===
List of studio albums, with selected details
| Title | Details |
|---|---|
| Paranoik | Released: 17 February 2023; Label: Zion Music; Format: Digital download, streaming |

=== Soundtrack albums ===
List of soundtrack albums, with selected details
| Title | Details |
|---|---|
| Plaksa (with Nika Zhukova) | Released: 9 November 2023; Label: Zion Music; Format: Digital download, streaming |

=== Extended plays ===
List of extended plays, with selected details
| Title | Details |
|---|---|
| Emotsii – Posledstviya | Released: 28 November 2025; Label: Zion Music; Format: Digital download, streaming |

=== Singles ===
==== As lead artist: 2020–2023 ====
List of singles released from 2020 to 2023 as lead artist, showing year released, chart positions and album name
| Title | Year | Peak chart positions | | | | | | | | | Album or EP |
| Title | Year | RUS Air. | RUS Stream. | BLR Air. | CIS Air. | EST Air. | KAZ Air. | LAT Air. (Note: No charts were published by the Latvian Music Producers Association between March 2021 and January 2023. As the association confirmed that it uses Radiomonitor data starting from January 2023, unavailable peak positions from the earlier period are also based on Radiomonitor data, but published directly by Radiomonitor. From January 2023, when both LaIPA and TopHit began publishing Latvian airplay charts, peak positions are taken from LaIPA where available; however, as not all of Dmitrienko's singles charted on LaIPA while several peaked on TopHit, TopHit data is also taken into consideration from that date onward.) | LTU Air. | MDA Air. | Album or EP |
|---|---|---|---|---|---|---|---|---|---|---|---|
| "V serdechke nit" | 2020 | — | * | * | — | * | * | — | * | * | Non-album singles |
| "Tantsuy" | 2020 | — | * | * | — | * | * | — | * | * | Non-album singles |
| "Takiye dela" (with Ruvi) | 2020 | — | * | * | — | * | * | — | * | * | Non-album singles |
| "Navechno" | 2020 | — | * | * | — | * | * | — | * | * | Non-album singles |
| "Venera-Yupiter" | 2021 | 1 | * | 109 | 2 | * | 4 | 34 | * | 38 | Non-album singles |
| "Sterva" | 2021 | — | * | * | — | * | * | — | * | * | Non-album singles |
| "36,6" | 2021 | 131 | * | * | 155 | * | * | — | * | * | Non-album singles |
| "Liftami" (with Daasha) | 2021 | — | * | * | — | * | * | — | * | * | Chuvstva Z |
| "Otkrytka" (with Khabib) | 2021 | — | * | * | — | * | * | — | * | * | Non-album singles |
| "Puskay" | 2021 | — | * | * | — | * | * | — | * | * | Non-album singles |
| "Tantsy pod dozhdyem" (with Mia Boyka) | 2021 | — | * | * | — | * | * | — | * | * | Proshchal'nyy al'bom |
| "Ty so mnoy" (with Lina Lee) | 2021 | — | * | * | — | * | * | — | * | * | Non-album singles |
| "Vsyo ne tak" (with Anet Sai) | 2021 | — | * | * | — | * | * | — | * | * | Non-album singles |
| "220" | 2021 | — | * | * | — | * | * | — | * | 200 | 200 Po Vstrechnoy (Tribute Album) |
| "220" | 2021 | — | * | * | — | * | * | — | * | 200 | Paranoik |
| "Lego" | 2022 | 93 | * | * | 119 | * | 135 | — | * | 147 | Non-album singles |
| "Ya veryu (Sputnik)" (with Om) | 2022 | — | * | * | — | * | * | — | * | * | Non-album singles |
| "Psina" (with Grillyazh) | 2022 | — | * | * | — | * | * | — | * | * | Non-album singles |
| "Drugoye delo" | 2022 | — | * | * | — | * | * | — | * | * | Non-album singles |
| "Sila prityazheniya" | 2022 | 138 | * | * | 188 | 152 | * | 100 | * | * | Non-album singles |
| "Beybi" (with Grigory Leps) | 2022 | 62 | * | * | 99 | * | * | 83 | * | * | Zavtra |
| "31-ya vesna" | 2022 | — | * | * | — | * | * | — | * | * | Paranoik |
| "Nichego ne boysya, ya s toboy" (with Asiya) | 2022 | 88 | * | * | 133 | 86 | * | 10 | 8 | 8 | Non-album single |
| "Pizza" | 2023 | 17 | * | 52 | 23 | 28 | 25 | 19 | 3 | 4 | Paranoik |
| "Shkolnaya pora" | 2023 | — | * | — | — | — | — | — | — | — | Non-album singles |
| "Rybka" (with Moya Mishel) | 2023 | 40 | * | 183 | 51 | 20 | 155 | 17 | 6 | 67 | Non-album singles |
| "Ne zabiray" (with Cosmos Girls) | 2023 | — | * | — | — | — | — | — | — | — | Non-album singles |
| "Khatiko" | 2023 | — | * | — | — | 137 | — | 25 | — | 109 | Non-album singles |
| "Dozhd" | 2023 | — | * | — | — | 73 | — | — | 10 | — | Non-album singles |
| "Pryatki" | 2023 | 38 | 68 | 73 | 50 | 28 | 78 | 1 | 2 | 52 | Non-album singles |
"—" denotes items which were not released in that country or failed to chart. "*" denotes that the chart did not exist at that time.

==== As lead artist: since 2024 ====
List of singles released since 2024 as lead artist, showing year released, chart positions and album name
| Title | Year | Peak chart positions | | | | | | | | | | Album or EP |
| Title | Year | RUS Air. | RUS Stream. | BLR Air. | CIS Air. | EST Air. | KAZ Air. | LAT Air. | LAT Stream. | LTU Air. | MDA Air. | Album or EP |
|---|---|---|---|---|---|---|---|---|---|---|---|---|
| "Ne predstavlyayesh" (with 5utra) | 2024 | 2 | * | 24 | 7 | 84 | 1 | 14 | — | — | 3 | Non-album singles |
| "Ty dazhe ne predstavlyayesh" (with 5utra) | 2024 | — | * | — | — | — | — | — | — | — | — | Non-album singles |
| "Napalm" (with Stasyes) | 2024 | — | * | — | — | — | — | — | — | — | — | Non-album singles |
| "Vasilki" | 2024 | 43 | * | 88 | 71 | — | 186 | 54 | — | 121 | — | Non-album singles |
| "Vishnyovyy" | 2024 | 94 | 30 | — | 173 | — | — | 51 | — | 75 | 116 | Non-album singles |
| "Tsvetayeva" | 2025 | 145 | 45 | — | — | — | 50 | — | — | — | — | Non-album singles |
| "Nastoyashchaya" | 2025 | — | 8 | — | — | — | — | 160 | — | — | 14 | Non-album singles |
| "Shyolk" | 2025 | 6 | 1 | 22 | 14 | — | 20 | 13 | — | 13 | 18 | Non-album singles |
| "Ladoni" (with Saluki) | 2025 | — | 13 | — | — | — | — | 57 | — | — | — | Emotsii – Posledstviya |
| "Iney" (with Yanix) | 2025 | — | 27 | 201 | — | — | — | 55 | — | — | — | Non-album singles |
| "Rtut" | 2026 | 17 | 21 | 33 | 22 | — | — | 17 | — | — | 34 | Non-album singles |
| "Sled" | 2026 | — | 51 | — | — | — | — | 96 | — | — | — | Non-album singles |
| "Nedostupna" | 2026 | — | 35 | 197 | — | — | — | 12 | — | — | 76 | Non-album singles |
| "Otrazheniye" (with Malbec and Suzanna) | 2026 | 63 | 13 | 100 | 80 | — | 28 | 40 | 15 | — | — | Non-album singles |
| "Pocherk" | 2026 | — | 29 | 169 | — | — | — | 82 | — | — | — | Non-album singles |
"—" denotes items which were not released in that country or failed to chart. "*" denotes that the chart did not exist at that time.

==== As featured artist ====
List of sigles released as featured artist, showing year released and album name
| Title | Year | Album |
|---|---|---|
| "Otvet mne" (Open Kids featuring Vanya Dmitrienko) | 2020 | Non-album single |

=== Promotional singles ===
List of promotional singles released as lead artist, showing year released, chart positions and album name
| Title | Year | Peak chart positions | | | | | | | | | Album |
| Title | Year | RUS Air. | RUS Stream. | BLR Air. | CIS Air. | EST Air. | KAZ Air. | LAT Air. | LAT Stream. | MDA Air. | Album |
|---|---|---|---|---|---|---|---|---|---|---|---|
| "Za kulisami" (with Masha Koltsova, Arina Rostovskaya and Nikitata) | 2021 | — | * | * | — | * | | — | * | | Serdtse i kak im polzovatsya (soundtrack) |
| "Vechno molodym" | 2021 | 14 | * | * | 19 | * | | — | * | | Struny (soundtrack) |
| "Komanda match" | 2022 | — | * | * | — | * | | — | * | | Komanda match (soundtrack) |
| "Venera-Yupiter" (New Year's Eve version) | 2022 | — | * | * | — | * | | — | * | | Non-album single |
| "Dyshi" | 2023 | — | * | — | — | 173 | — | — | — | — | Plaksa (soundtrack) |
| "Khochesh, ya dam tebe ves mir" (with Nika Zhukova) | 2023 | — | * | — | — | 81 | — | — | — | — | Plaksa (soundtrack) |
| "Vot bystrey by vzrosloy stat" (with Nika Zhukova) | 2023 | — | * | — | — | — | — | — | — | — | Plaksa (soundtrack) |
| "Melom" | 2023 | — | * | — | — | — | — | — | — | — | Plaksa (soundtrack) |
| "Lyudi budushchego" (with DJ Smash) | 2024 | — | * | — | — | — | — | — | — | — | Games of the Future 2024 (soundtrack) |
| "Kapelki na resnitsakh" (with Nika Zhukova) | 2024 | — | * | — | — | — | — | — | — | — | Plaksa 2 (soundtrack) |
| "Mnogoetazhnyye chuvstva" | 2024 | — | — | — | — | — | 99 | — | — | — | Plaksa 2 (soundtrack) |
| "Siluet" (with Anna Peresild) | 2025 | 29 | 1 | 130 | 39 | — | 23 | 2 | 8 | 27 | Alice in Wonderland (soundtrack) |
"—" denotes items which were not released in that country or failed to chart. "*" denotes that the chart did not exist at that time.

== Awards and nominations ==
| Year | Award | Category | Results |
|---|---|---|---|
| 2021 | Golden Gramophone Award | | Won |
| 2021 | Novoye Radio Awards 2022 | Breakthrough of the year | Won |
| 2021 | Прорыв года Best 2021 | Discovery of the year | Won |
| 2021 | MTV Russia | Musician of the year | Won |
| 2021 | Premiya RU.TV 2021 | Best start | Nominated |
| 2022 | Premiya RU.TV 2022 | Film & Music | Nominated |
| 2022 | Zhara Music Awards 2022 | Breakthrough of the year | Won |
| 2025 | Yandex Music: Year in Review | Artist of the year | Won |
| 2025 | Yandex Music: Year in Review | Most anticipated release: Siluet | Won |
| 2026 | Russian Book of Records | The youngest artist to perform a sold out solo concert in Luzhniki Stadium | Won |
