= Eksponat =

2026 single by Mia Boyka

Single by Mia Boyka
- Language: Russian
- English title: Exhibit
- Released: 15 May 2026
- Genre: Pop
- Length: 1:38
- Label: Sputnik Records
- Songwriters: Ivan Grigoryevich Solovyov; Dmitry Andreyevich Popov
- Producer: Sputnik Records

Mia Boyka singles chronology
"Kazak" (2026)	"Eksponat" (2026)	"Prime" (2026)

Music video
- "Eksponat" on YouTube

"Eksponat" (Russian: Экспонат, lit. 'Exhibit') is a song by Russian singer Mia Boyka. It was released on 15 May 2026 by Sputnik Records. The song brought a new wave of widespread popularity to the performer, peaking within the top ten of the Genius Global weekly chart. Following the commercial success of the single, Boyka set an all-time record for the highest number of monthly listeners for a female artist on the Russian streaming platform Yandex Music. An official music video in support of the track was released in June of the same year.

== History ==
Prior to the official release, Mia Boyka generated anticipation for "Eksponat" by posting short promotional snippets on social media, which she has identified as her most effective method for music marketing. Initially, the singer disliked the track and did not intend to release it. However, after several of her singles from early 2026 failed to achieve expected commercial traction, she decided to revisit the initial demo recording. On 15 May 2026, the single was officially made available across all major digital music platforms through Sputnik Records.

Immediately following its release, the song achieved viral status on social media platforms, triggering polarized reactions from listeners and music journalists alike. Some critics argued that the song's thematic messaging promoted external physical attractiveness over personal character traits. Boyka later clarified that the song was written with an ironic undertone meant to boost women's self-esteem following her own personal experience with a relationship breakup. She also noted that public backlash and negative commentary ultimately contributed to an increase in her overall streaming metrics and internet reach.

== Music videos ==
=== Mood video ===
An official mood video for the song was released on 15 June 2026. It served as the initial visual accompaniment to the single prior to the premiere of the main music video.

=== Official music video ===
The official high-budget music video for "Eksponat", directed by aigenyi, premiered on 30 June 2026. The imagery and visual style of the video were entirely heavily inspired by the "pink" aesthetics of the 2023 film Barbie. The video depicts a luxurious lifestyle led by the protagonist, and features prominent commercial product placement, which triggered discussions among viewers online.

== Commercial performance ==
In Russia, the song immediately debuted on TopHit's Russian streaming chart at number 89 on the weekly chart dated 21 May 2026, just days after its official release. It quickly experienced a surge in digital consumption, reaching number one in the streaming chart published on 4 June 2026, and remained at the top position for the subsequent weeks dated 11, 18, and 25 June.

Outside of Russia, the song saw strong regional performance across other post-Soviet states. In Latvia, "Eksponat" debuted at number 41 on TopHit's Latvian Airplay chart on 11 June 2026, hitting a peak of number 18 later that month.

On domestic music services, the track achieved historic metrics. Following its release, it topped the main track charts of the Russian streaming services Yandex Music, VK Music, and Zvuk. Driven by the single's widespread performance, Boyka set a platform-wide record on Yandex Music, securing an all-time high of 12.4 million unique monthly listeners.

== Charts ==
=== Weekly charts ===
Weekly chart performance for "Eksponat"
Chart (2026)	Peak position
CIS Airplay (TopHit)	161
Kazakhstan Airplay (TopHit)	9
Latvia Airplay (TopHit)	18
Latvia Streaming (LaIPA)	3
Lithuania (AGATA)	15
Russia Airplay (TopHit)	125
Russia Streaming (TopHit)	1

Weekly chart performance for "Eksponat (Remix)"
Chart (2026)	Peak position
Latvia Airplay (TopHit)	74

=== Monthly charts ===
Monthly chart performance for "Eksponat"
Chart (2026)	Peak position
Kazakhstan Airplay (TopHit)	15
Latvia Airplay (TopHit)	19
Russia Streaming (TopHit)	2

Monthly chart performance for "Eksponat (Remix)"
Chart (2026)	Peak position
Latvia Airplay (TopHit)	82

=== Decade-end charts ===
20s Decade-end chart performance
Chart (2026)	Position
Russia Streaming (TopHit)	38
