= Tatiana Kurtukova =

Russian singer

Tatyana Kurtukova Татьяна Куртукова
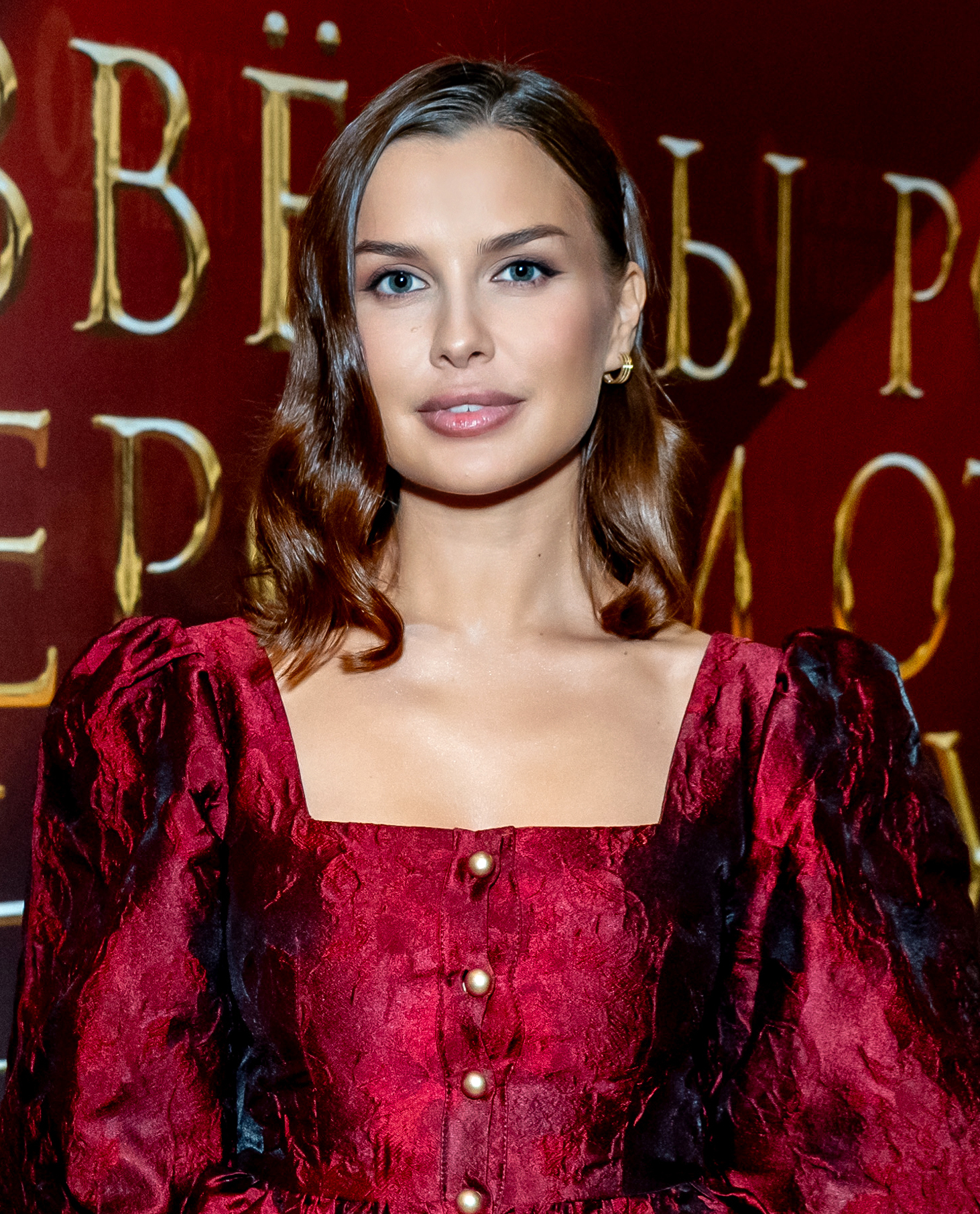
- Kurtukova in 2024

Background information
- Born: September 9, 1993 (age 33); Khabarovsk, Russia
- Origin: Penza, Russia
- Genres: Folk, Pop, Traditional
- Occupations: Singer, songwriter, actress, teacher
- Instrument: Vocal
- Works: See discography
- Years active: 2008–present
- Label: Gamma Music
- Spouse: Nikita Makeev (m. 2019)

Tatyana Sergeyevna Makeeva (née Kurtukova; born 9 September 1993, Khabarovsk, Russia) is a Russian singer-songwriter, actress, and teacher, performing Russian folk and bard. She gained wide recognition after releasing the single "Matushka".

== Biography ==
=== Early years ===
She was born on 9 September 1993, in Khabarovsk, her mother was educated as a political scientist, and her father was an engineer. In her childhood, she moved with her parents to Penza, which she considers her hometown.

At the age of four, she began studying at the children's art school "Lyra" in the piano program. Later, she simultaneously enrolled in a folklore program. After completing music school, she entered the Penza College of Arts, specializing in "Choral conducting," qualifying as a "Choir and creative team leader, teacher of choral disciplines, choir and ensemble artist".

In 2012, she entered the M. M. Ippolitov-Ivanov State Institute of Music and Pedagogy in Moscow, continuing her studies in the vocal-choral and conducting department, focusing on "Folk singing".

In 2016, she received a bachelor's degree in "Concert performer. Ensemble soloist. Teacher." After graduating from the Ippolitov-Ivanov Institute, she began teaching at the Penza College of Arts while simultaneously studying at the Penza State University, where she earned a master's degree in "Psychologist-educator".

=== Teaching career ===
She taught at the Penza College of Arts, focusing on voice training in the theater department, and later theoretical disciplines, including "Musical arrangement for performances" and "Folk artistic culture". She performed with the folk group "Plamen’" and worked at the theater "Revolver".

Later, she taught vocal voice training and acted as a musical illustrator at the Moscow Youth Theater "Revolver".

=== Musical career ===
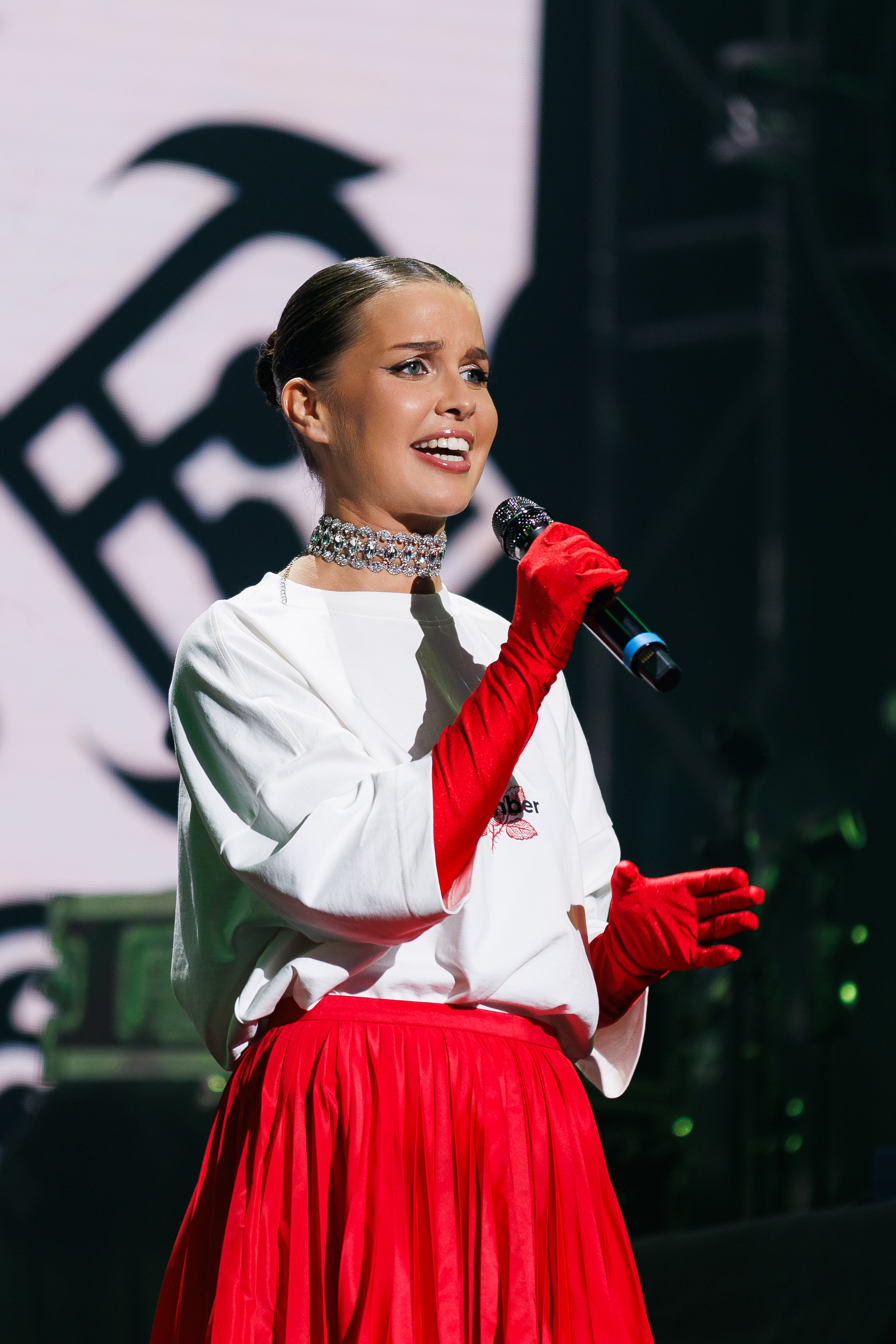
Tatiana Kurtukova performing in December 2024

She has performed folk music since her school days, participating in folklore expeditions. According to her, she became interested in music at an early age.

In 2008, she won the Grand Prix of the Third Festival-Contest of Children's and Youth Creativity "Window to Europe," held in Saint Petersburg. In 2009, she performed military-themed folk songs at the "Orlyata Rossii" festival in Tuapse, winning the Grand Prix. In 2014, she won the international competition "Optinskaya Vesna" in the town of Kozelsk, Kaluga Oblast. In 2018, she represented Penza Oblast in the "New Star" competition on the Zvezda TV channel. That same year, she released several songs under the pseudonym TAiNA.

In 2022, Tatiana Kurtukova released singles "Matushka" and "Russkaya Zima," with lyrics and music by Petr Andreev.

She performed the song "Matushka" on the Russia-1 TV channel on Andrey Malakhov's show "Songs from the Heart".

In 2023, she released the singles "Glaza" (Eyes), "Rodniki" (Springs), and "Ya Lyubila Sokola" (I Loved a Falcon), and in 2024, the singles "Romashka-Vasilek" (Chamomile-Cornflower) and "Odnogo" (One). That year, the single "Matushka" entered the top-10 charts of Shazam, VK Music, Yandex Music, and Apple Music.

We weren't aiming to ride any wave of patriotism. In fact, the song is even somewhat provocative. In it, we acknowledge that our beloved country might be a "splinter" for someone. It's simply stating a fact. But many channels and radio stations were hesitant to air it. Eventually, "Matushka" was chosen by the listeners themselves. They created so many videos with it that it became clear: they wanted this kind of truth and this kind of art to express their opinions.

— Tatiana Kurtukova

The official music video for "Matushka," published on YouTube in 2024, garnered over 170 million views, while a video of her performance on the "Zhar-Ptitsa" channel gained more than 100 million views.

In November 2024, she issued the six–track EP U istoka (At the Source) through Gamma Music. In April 2025, InterMedia reported the single "Nalivnoye yablochko," written by Anatoly Alekseev and Anna Lepskaya and released by Gamma Music. On 12 June 2025 (Russia Day) she released "Russkaya doroga" ("Russian Road"), also through Gamma Music; a music video premiered the same day. Her 2025 duet with Oleg Gazmanov on "Ozyora siniye" ("Blue Lakes") credits words and music to Gazmanov. On 12 September 2025, she released the single "S dobrom" ("With Kindness"), again via Gamma Music. Kurtukova has discussed her folk style and early training in city television interviews, including a 2024 segment on Moscow 24's Intervyu program.

=== Personal life ===
In 2019, she married Nikita Makeev, an international law attorney. Tatiana took her husband's family name, but performs under her maiden name. The couple had a daughter, Evnika, in 2023.

Kurtukova collects traditional Russian costumes. Since her student years, she has participated in folklore expeditions across Russian villages and hamlets, gathering folk art and authentic costumes, which she often incorporates into her stage appearances at concerts.

== Discography ==
=== Extended plays ===
- 2024 — U istoka

=== Singles ===
List of singles as lead artist, showing album name and year released
Title	Year	Peak chart positions			Album or EP
Title	Year	RUS Air.	RUS Stream.	CIS Air.	Album or EP
"Matushka"	2022	29	2	53	U istoka
"Russkaya zima"	2022	—	*	—	Non-album singles
"Glaza"	2023	—	*	—	Non-album singles
"Rodniki"	2023	—	*	—	Non-album singles
"Ya lyubila sokola"	2023	—	*	—	Non-album singles
"Romashka-vasilek"	2024	132	*	—	U istoka
"Odnogo"	2024	67	5	123	U istoka
"Ozyora siniye" (with Oleg Gazmanov)	2024	141	*	—	Non-album singles
"Nalivnoye yablochko"	2025	55	—	89	Non-album singles
"Siniy platochek"	2025	—	83	—	Non-album singles
"Russkaya doroga"	2025	—	—	—	Non-album singles
"S dobrom"	2025	94	—	—	Non-album singles
"Sinyaya voda"	2026	67	—	97	Non-album singles
"Alyoshenka"	2026	26	94	30	Non-album singles
"—" denotes a recording that did not chart in that territory. "*" denotes that the chart did not exist at that time.

=== Other charted songs ===
List of other charted songs, showing album name and year released
Title	Year	Peak chart positions	Album
Title	Year	RUS Stream.	Album
"Matushka" (Ultrafunk Remix) (with Satirin, Funk Demon and Evo)	2024	92	Non-album singles
"Odnogo" (Legendaris Ultrafunk Remix) (with DJ Bratt)	2025	54	Non-album singles

== Awards ==
- 2025 — ЖАРА Music Awards, Breakthrough of the Year (Прорыв года).
