= Bazovyy minimum =

"Basic Minimum"

Single by Sabi and Mia Boyka
- Language: Russian
- Released: 1 August 2025
- Genre: Pop music
- Length: 2:15
- Label: Sputnik Records
- Songwriters: Mia Boyka, Soloviev Ivan Grigorievich, Popov Dmitry Andreevich

"Bazovyy minimum" (Russian: Базовый минимум, lit. 'Basic Minimum') is a 2025 single by Russian singers Sabi and Mia Boyka. The song gained popularity online due to its ironic lyrics about high expectations in modern relationships, and became a viral hit on social media and streaming platform charts.

== Release ==
In July 2025, Mia Boyka posted a video on her TikTok account featuring a short excerpt from her new song "Basic Minimum." The song was revealed to be a collaboration with singer Sabi. The song soon gained popularity on social media.

Reportedly, one of the reasons behind the song's popularity was a video by bloggers from Ulan-Ude, who filmed a funny scene featuring flowers and dancing, using a brightly coloured rag as a wig. The video went viral, and set the trend's humorous tone.

In mid-August, the track was released on Like FM radio station. By 25 August 2025, less than a month after its release, the song had surpassed 5 million plays on streaming platforms. By mid-September 2025, "Basic Minimum" topped the VK Music chart. Its success beyond local platforms was confirmed by Western streaming statistics: by early 2026, the track's number of plays on Spotify exceeded 10 million. In December 2025, the singers performed the song at the Pesnya goda.

== Criticism ==
The professional community of psychologists on the B17 portal analyzed the reasons why the track provoked strong rejection among male audiences. The Psychologies magazine examined the meaning of the lyrics in the context of modern value. According to Gazeta.Ru, the song increased the use of the phrase in Russian speech.

== Charts ==
Weekly chart performance for "Bazovyy minimum"
Chart (2026)	Peak position
Belarus Airplay (TopHit)	171
India International (IMI)	9
Lithuania (AGATA)	34
Russia Streaming (TopHit)	2
