= Sabi (Russian singer) =

Russian singer (born 2000)

Sabi Саби
- Born: Sabina Mamedova; April 25, 2000 (age 26); Novosibirsk, Russia
- Origin: Moscow
- Genre: Pop
- Occupations: Singer; Songwriter
- Years active: 2024–present
- Label: Sputnik Records

Sabina Mamedova (Russian: Сабина Мамедова; born 25 April 2000), known profesionally as Sabi (Russian: Саби) is a Russian singer and songwriter.

Sabi's currently most known singles includes "Ya tvoy stress" (2025), "Potomu chto tak nado" (2025) and "Bazovyy minimum" (recorded with Mia Boyka in 2025), the latter one went viral on TikTok internationally in 2026.

== Biography ==
She was born on 25 April 2000 in Novosibirsk, Russia, and is of Azerbaijani descent. Mamedova completed 11 grades at a school in Moscow, then studied at Moscow State University for a master's degree in criminal psychology.

=== Music career ===
In 2024, she began her creative journey after completing acting courses by making short videos, known as reels, for Instagram. After her audience began to grow, she decided to pursue music. Her first song, "Ya tvoy stress", which is a cover version of the song "SOS" by the Azerbaijani singer Aygun Kazimova, became a hit. She then released the single "Potomu chto tak nado", which also became recognised online.

In August 2025, she collaborated with Russian singer Mia Boyka on the hit "Bazovyy minimum", which won in the category "Internet Hit of the Year" at Zhara Music Awards 2026, was nominated in the category "Best Collaboration" at Premya Muz-TV 2026 music awards and won in the category "Music Online" at Premya RU.TV 2026 music awards. The track peaked at number two on the TopHit's official Russian Streaming Chart and reached the top forty on AGATA's Singlų Top 100, the official streaming and radio chart of Lithuania.

In July 2026, "Bazovyy minimum" peaked at number 9 on the official streaming charts in India for international songs – IMI International Top 20 Singles. This is the second Russian song to chart there, after Instasamka with "Otklyuchayu telefon" in 2023.

== Discography ==
=== Extended plays ===
List of extended plays, with selected details
Title	Details
Bazovyy minimum	Released: 14 November 2025; Label: Sputnik Records, Media Land; Format: Digital download, streaming

=== Singles ===
List of singles as lead artist, showing year released, chart positions and album name
Title	Year	Peak chart positions				Album or EP
Title	Year	RUS Stream.	BLR Air.	IND Int.	LTU	Album or EP
"Otnyne ya odna"	2025	*	—	—	—	Non-album singles
"Mne vse ravno"	2025	—	—	—	—	Non-album singles
"Ya tvoy stress" (with Aygün Kazımova)	2025	18	—	—	—	Non-album singles
"Potomu chto tak nado"	2025	—	—	—	—	Non-album singles
"Dubai–Baku" (with Chaga)	2025	—	—	—	—	Non-album singles
"Bazovyy minimum" (with Mia Boyka)	2025	2	171	9	34	Bazovyy minimum
"Lavash" (with Azer Nasibov)	2025	—	—	—	—	Non-album singles
"Vernyy" (with Shami)	2025	—	—	—	—	Non-album singles
"Kacheli"	2026	—	—	—	—	Non-album singles
"O Yes"	2026	—	—	—	—	Non-album singles
"Serdtse podari" (with Fardi)	2026	—	—	—	—	Non-album singles
"Ukradi"	2026	—	—	—	—	Non-album singles
"Ya tebya ne znayu" (with Doni and DJ Daveed)	2026	—	—	—	—	Non-album singles
"Skandal" (with Masha Tilla)	2026	—	—	—	—	Non-album singles
"Gordyy"	2026	—	—	—	—	Non-album singles
"—" denotes items which were not released in that country or failed to chart. "*" denotes that the chart did not exist at that time.
