= Saluki (singer) =

Russian singer (born 1997)

- Also known as: SALUKI (current); Lil A1ds; HorrorKing; Wild Hon3y
- Born: Arseniy Aleksandrovich Nesaty; Арсе́ний Алекса́ндрович Неса́тый; July 5, 1997 (age 29); Moscow, Russia
- Genres: Hip-hop; Trap; Alternative hip-hop; Trip-hop
- Years active: 2013-present

Saluki (Russian: Салу́ки), real name Arseniy Aleksandrovich Nesaty (Russian: Арсе́ний Алекса́ндрович Неса́тый; born 5 July 1997, Moscow) is a Russian rapper, producer and songwriter. He is a former member of the group Dead Dynasty.

== Biography ==
=== Early life: youth-the beginning of his music career ===
Arseniy Nesaty was born on 5 July 1997 in Moscow. After receiving a Black Eyed Peas album from his father as a child, he started listening to various artists, including David Bowie, Joy Division and others. His production career began after his brother showed him the music-making program Beatmaker 2.

=== WILD EA$T ===
On 21 April 2023, his album WILD EA$T was released on streaming platforms.

The album was warmly received by fans and artists, and also has many positive reviews.

== Discography ==
=== Studio albums ===
Year	Studio Album
2019	"Властелин калек"
2021	"Стыд или слава" (with 104)
2023	WILD EA$T
2024	BEACH ROCK HOTEL
2024	BOLSHIE KURTKI

=== Charted singles ===
==== As lead artist ====
List of charted singles released as lead artist, showing year released, chart positions and album name
Title	Year	Peak chart positions		Album or EP
Title	Year	RUS Stream.	LAT Air.	Album or EP
"Ladoni" (with Vanya Dmitrienko)	2025	13	57	Emotsii – Posledstviya
