= T-killah =

Russian singer and rapper (born 1989)

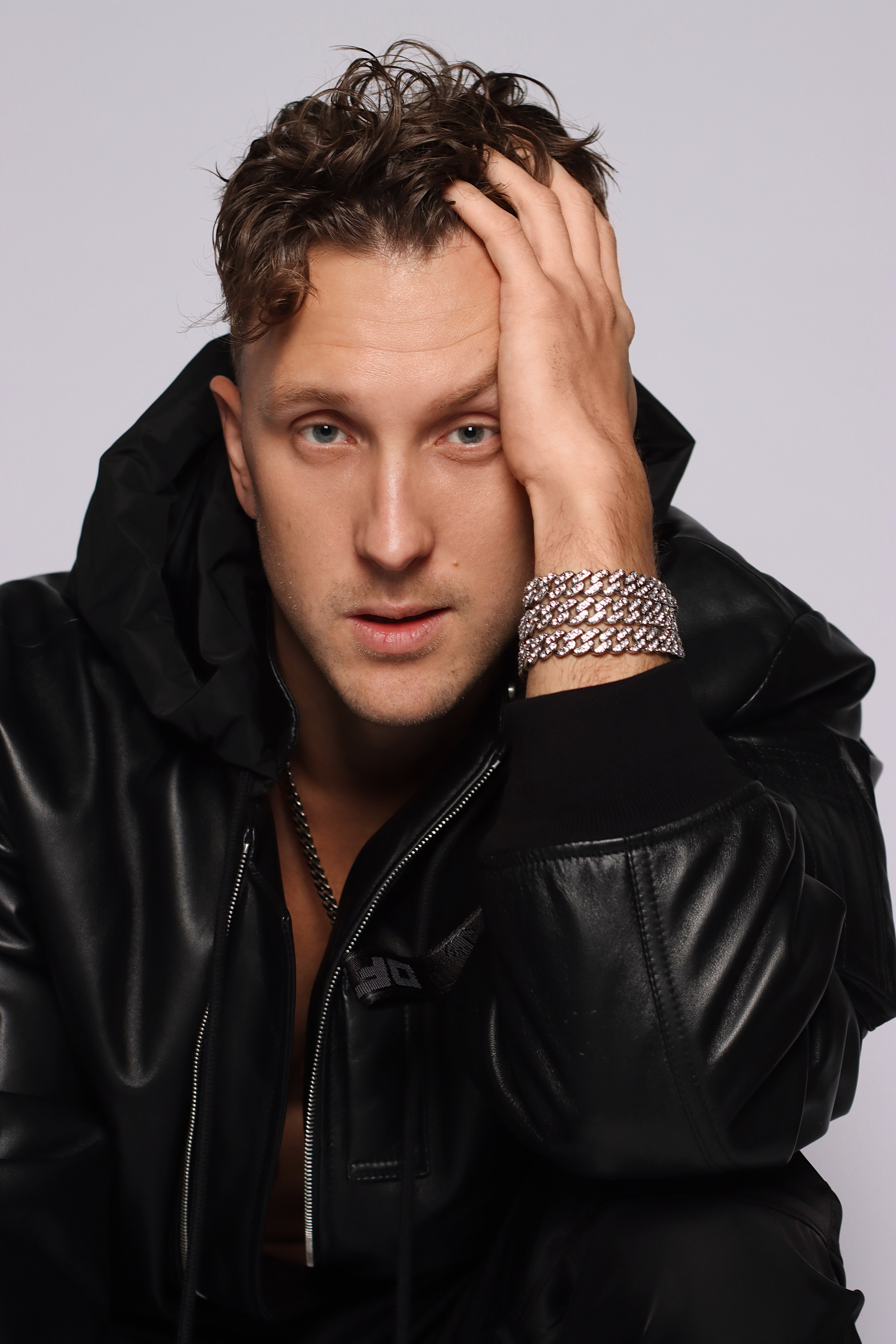
T-Killah.

Alexander Ivanovich Tarasov (known under the pseudonym T-Killah, born 30 April 1989) is a Russian hip-hop, R&B, rap artist and music producer.

== Early life ==
Tarasov was born in Moscow.

== Career ==
Thanks to Mia Boyka, he became popular in 2019.

== Personal life ==
In 2017 his father died of a stroke. In 2019, he married journalist Maria Belova.

At the end of 2022, the couple announced that after three years of marriage they were expecting their first child, the star couple shared this news on their Instagram.

== Discography ==
- 2013: Boom
- 2015: Головоломки (Golovolomki)
- 2016: Напиток (Napitok)
- 2020: Витамин Т (Vitamin T)
