= RASA (group) =

Russian musical duo

RASA is a musical duo, consisting of Russian singers Viktor Popleev and Daria Sheiko, active since November 2017. The couple welcomed a baby girl, Eva, on 31 October 2020.

== Discography ==
«PRIDE»
Review scores
Source	Rating
InterMedia	7.5/10 stars

=== EPs ===
Title
PRIDE
Information
- Release: 6 December 2019
- Label: Zion Music
- Format: Digital distribution
Notes

* Track List
No.	Title	Length
1.	"Алые-алые"	3:11
2.	"Как ты там?"	2:27
3.	"Сахар и чай"	2:30
4.	"Ягуар"	2:24
5.	"Уголёк"	2:55
6.	"Забери меня"	3:19
7.	"Кошка"	2:47
Total length:		18:13

== Videography ==
External videos
- «Под фонарём»
- «Эликсир»
- «Baby»
- «Dior»
- «Фиолетово»
- «Пчеловод»
- «Кошка»
- «Эльдорадо»
- «Пьяная гитара»
- «Рашн карантин»
- «Кукла»

== Awards and nominations ==
Year	Award	Category	Result	Ref.
2019	Премия RU.TV	Strong start	Nominated	
