= Matushka (song) =

2022 single by Tatiana Kurtukova

Single by Tatiana Kurtukova
- Language: Russian
- Released: March 24, 2022
- Recorded: 2018 (for the World Cup)
- Genre: Folk-pop
- Length: 2:52
- Label: Gamma Music
- Songwriter: Peter Andreev
- Producer: Peter Andreev

Tatiana Kurtukova singles chronology
"Matushka" (2022)	"Russian winter" (2022)

"Matushka" (also known as "Matushka-zemlya") is a song by Russian singer Tatiana Kurtukova, released in 2022 as her debut single. The music and lyrics were written by Peter Andreev. Kurtukova, who was performing under the stage name TAiNA at the time, had originally uploaded the song online in 2018 under its original title, "Pro lyubov" ("About Love").

In 2024, the song gained significant popularity among listeners both in Russia and abroad. It was included on the singer's EP U istoka ("At the Source").

== Music video ==
Two music videos were created for the song "Matushka". In the first, released in 2022, Kurtukova performs the song against a white background, wearing the same outfit throughout. In the 2024 version, the singer appears in traditional costumes representing the peoples of Russia, including Buryats, Kumyks, Nenets, and Russian attire.

== Reviews ==
Dinara Kafiskina of Fontanka.ru described "Matushka" as the leading patriotic hit of early 2024. The newspaper Komsomolskaya Pravda referred to the song as a "folk hit" that "brought the nation together". Ilya Voronin of Zvuk Media noted that the song largely embodies the country's current turn toward its roots.

== Administrative liability for singing the song in Kyiv ==
On January 8, 2026, in Kyiv, the Ukrainian police and the SBU identified and held three individuals administratively liable for "petty hooliganism" for singing the songs "Matushka" and "Moskva" by DJ Smash while driving through the city. A video of them performing the songs was posted online, drawing the attention of Ukrainian law enforcement.

== Awards ==
At the Victoria and Muz-TV awards, "Matushka" was recognized as the Song of the Year.

== Charts ==
=== Weekly charts ===
2024 weekly chart performance
Chart (2024)	Peak position
CIS Airplay (TopHit)	53
Russia Airplay (TopHit)	29

2025 weekly chart performance
Chart (2025)	Peak position
CIS Airplay (TopHit)	74
Russia Airplay (TopHit)	42
Russia Streaming (TopHit)	2

2026 weekly chart performance
Chart (2026)	Peak position
CIS Airplay (TopHit)	78
Russia Airplay (TopHit)	54
Russia Streaming (TopHit)	15

=== Monthly charts ===
2024 monthly chart performance
Chart (2024)	Peak position
CIS Airplay (TopHit)	54
Russia Airplay (TopHit)	30

2025 monthly chart performance
Chart (2025)	Peak position
CIS Airplay (TopHit)	84
Russia Airplay (TopHit)	45
Russia Streaming (TopHit)	2

2026 monthly chart performance
Chart (2026)	Peak position
Russia Airplay (TopHit)	67
Russia Streaming (TopHit)	22

=== Year-end charts ===
2024 year-end chart performance
Chart (2024)	Peak position
CIS Airplay (TopHit)	97
Russia Airplay (TopHit)	52

2025 year-end chart performance
Chart (2025)	Peak position
CIS Airplay (TopHit)	123
Russia Airplay (TopHit)	67
Russia Streaming (TopHit)	2

=== Decade-end charts ===
20s decade-end chart performance
Chart (2025–2026)	Position
Russia Streaming (TopHit)	6
