= Egor Ship =

Russian singer (born 2002)

Egor Ship Егор Шип
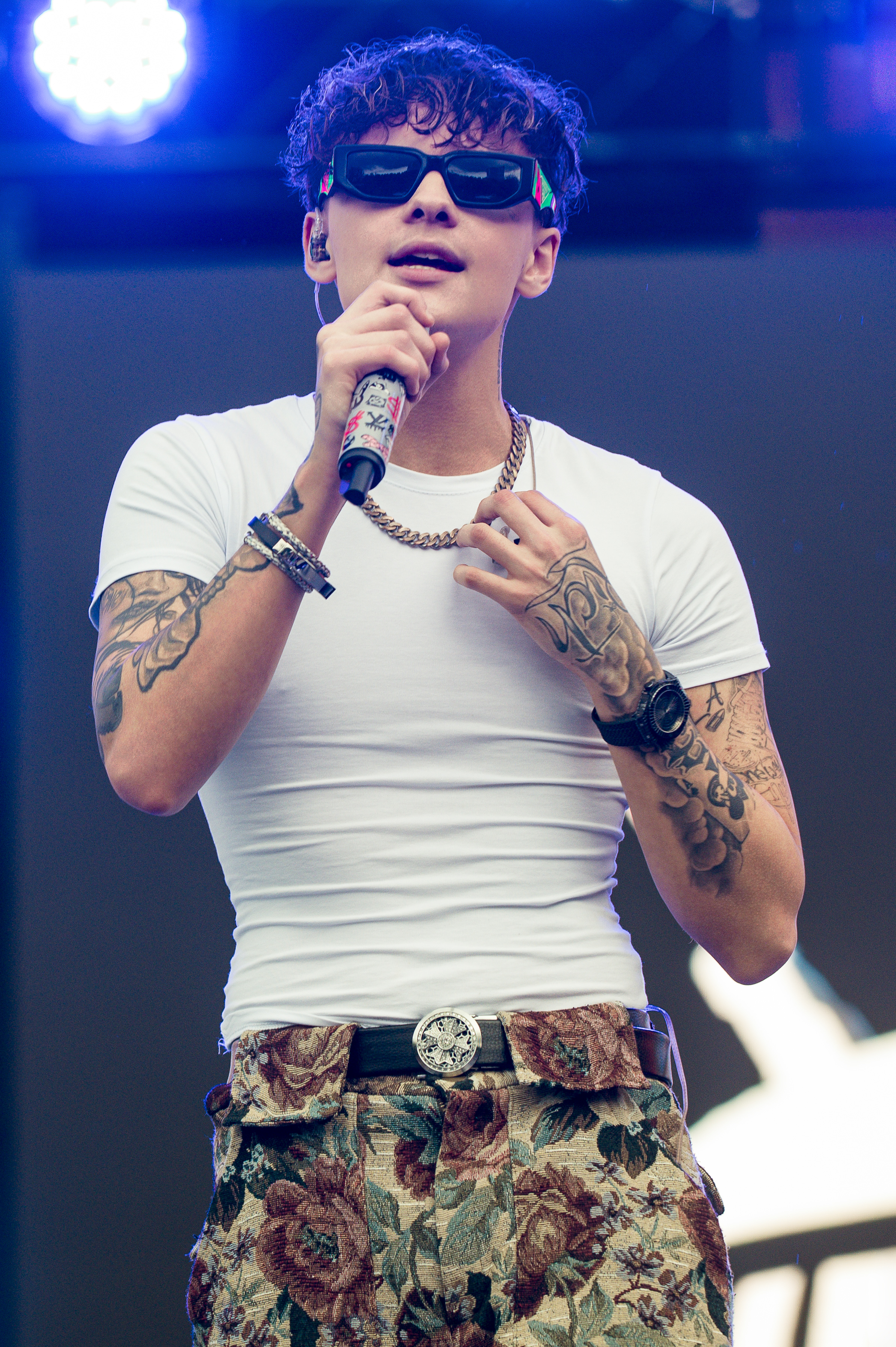
- Ship in 2025

Background information
- Born: Egor Vladimirovich Korablin; Егор Владимирович Кораблин; February 12, 2002 (age 24); Moscow, Russia
- Genres: Rock; Pop; Hip hop
- Occupations: vlogger; singer
- Years active: 2019-present
- Label: Black Star

Egor Vladimirovich Korablin (Russian: Его́р Влади́мирович Корабли́н) better known as Egor Ship (Russian: Его́р Шип; born 12 February 2002, Moscow) is a Russian vlogger and singer. He has been an advisor to the Committee for Work with Bloggers of the Russian political party "New People" since 18 December 2025.

== Biography ==
He was born on 12 February 2002 in Moscow.

He played football for 10 years, but quit in 2019.

On 28 May 2020, he released the track "DIOR." The music video for the song was published on YouTube on 1 June 2020.

At the end of June of that year, he released the track "Как твои дела?", with the video releasing on 1 July. Ship dedicated this song to Valya Karnaval.

On 2 December 2020, Ship released the song "Невидимка," and the video was released on 8 December.

In September 2021, Ship switched from his Make It Music label to Black Star Inc.

== Personal life ==
From the start of 2020 until that summer, he had dated Valya Karnaval.

== Discography ==
=== EPs ===
| Title | Information |
|---|---|
| «DIORЫ» | Release: 29 June 2023; Label: Black Star Inc.; Format: digital distribution |

== Awards and nominations ==
| Year | Award | Nomination | Results | Notes |
|---|---|---|---|---|
| 2020 | Итоги года 2020 по версии телеканала «ТНТ Music» | Лучший тиктокер года | Nominated | Runner-up |
| 2021 | ZHARA MUSIC AWARDS 2021 | Трендсеттер года | Nominated | |
| 2022 | ZHARA MUSIC AWARDS 2022 | Трендсеттер года | Nominated | |
