= Zion Music =

Russian record label

- Founded: 2009; 17 years ago
- Genre: Pop; Hip Hop
- Country of origin: Russia
- Official website: zionmusic.ru

Zion Music is a Russian music label, founded in 2009 in Moscow. In addition to sound production, it functions as a publishing house and management company.

== History ==
Since 2017, the label has been collaborating with rap artist Alexey Uzenyuk (Eldzhey).

In 2018, the label signed a contract with the duo RASA.

In the summer of 2019, Danil Prytkov (Niletto) met Dionisy Sattarov, and soon Zion Music signed a contract with Niletto.

Since the summer of 2020, Zion Music has been working with Russian singer Vanya Dmitrienko.

In 2022, Zion Music acquired control of Alyona Apina's full catalog, as well as the catologs for the bands Kraski and Virus.

In February 2023, the label released Vanya Dmitrienko's debut album, "Параноик."
