= Yandex Music =

Russian music streaming service

- Developer: Yandex
- Launch date: September 22, 2010; 15 years ago
- Platforms: iOS; iPadOS; watchOS; Android; Microsoft Windows; macOS
- Status: Active
- Website: music.yandex.com

Yandex Music (Russian: Яндекс Музыка, romanized: Yandeks Muzyka) is a Russian music streaming service launched by Yandex in 2010. As of October 2017, the service has over 40 million songs with about 20 million people using the service at least once a month. It offers DRM-protected audio content, including songs and music videos, as well as podcasts. Apart from Russia, service is also available in Armenia, Azerbaijan, Belarus, Georgia, Israel, Kazakhstan, Kyrgyzstan, Moldova, Tajikistan, Turkmenistan and Uzbekistan. Subscription can only be paid from supported countries, but the service is then available in all other countries.

The most popular feature of Yandex Music are the personalized smart playlists, which are updated daily and features recently played tracks, music similar to their favorite tracks, and diverse tracks that are based on user's tastes.

== User options ==
- Personal recommendations
- Catalog search and category structuring
- Creating playlists and transferring them between accounts and devices
- Offline playback of downloaded tracks (for paid subscribers)
- Saving music to a personal library
- Music videos streaming
- Embedding tracks to web-sites
- Import of music from Spotify, VK Music and Apple Music
- Search for music by lyrics or "tunes"
- Buying concert tickets
- Music selections by the editorial staff, brands, media, musicians, bloggers, labels, etc.
- Notifications of new releases by favorite artists or podcasts
- Maximum bitrate playback up to 320 kbit/s and the sampling frequency of 44.1 kHz, 16-bit, stereo

== History ==
On September 22, 2010, Yandex announced the launch of a separate service, Yandex Music, which allowed streaming of songs, albums and collections of various artists to user device on demand. More than 50 rightsholders provided content for the service, including Universal, EMI, Warner Music Group, Sony Music, First Music Publishing, Monolit, SBA Production etc.

800 thousand tracks by 58 thousand artists were available in the catalogue at the time of launch.

On May 30, 2012, Yandex released the Yandex Music application for iOS.

In May 2013, the Yandex Music application for Android was released.

In September 2014, Yandex started using the system of personal recommendations. Playlist forming became sensitive to the personal musical preferences of the user and his friends on Vkontakte and Facebook. The interface also changed significantly.

In October 2017, Yandex made a complete redesign of the service. The sections "New Releases", "Playlists with New Compositions", "Mood and Genres" and "Charts" were added to the main page. The player and the artist screens also changed.

In June 2018, Yandex Music was launched in Armenia. By the time of the launch, the interface was translated into Armenian, the service’s editorial team prepared playlists with Armenian music, and daily updated charts with tracks popular in Armenia appeared on the main page.

In October 2018, Yandex Music was launched in Israel. The catalog has been updated. Popular local artists have been added. The search started to understand queries in English and Hebrew.

In 2022, during the Russian invasion of Ukraine, a number of foreign copyright holders ceased cooperation with Yandex Music, thereby users lost access to some foreign tracks, while the service suffered record losses.

== Technologies ==
To form personal recommendations, the service uses artificial neural networks. Algorithms developed on the basis of the neural networks and similar developments of other companies allow computers to better understand how music works and to learn to perceive it in the same way as a person does.
