= Elya Chavez =

Russian singer (born 1984)

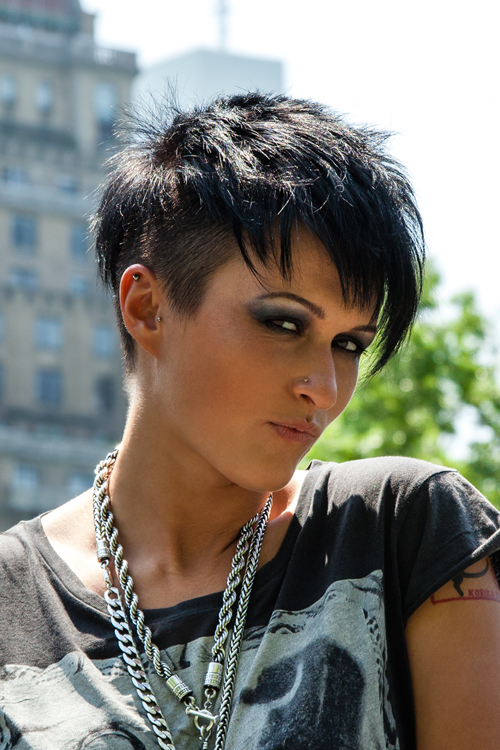

Background information
- Born: Eleanor Marina, Marina Firsova Chavez; July 31, 1984 (age 41); Moscow, Soviet Union
- Genres: Soft rock
- Occupation: Singer
- Years active: 2006–present
- Labels: Anken Todd Partnership
- Website: elyachavez.com

Elya Chavez (born 31 July 1984, Moscow) is a Russian brite style singer of Portuguese descent singing in Russian, Japanese and English.

In 2006 she started her solo vocal career under cooperation with the Anken Todd Partnership producer center.

In 2007 she acted in the Roland Joffé’s film "Finding t.A.T.u", which was later dubbed as You and I. In 2008 she featured in the Maksim Voronkov’s film "A Mama Luchshe!".

In 2011 she officially submitted an application to Channel One Russia to participate in the Eurovision Song Contest with the song "I Decide", but received no answer. On 19 April 2011, she was awarded a certificate of gratitude for holding a charity concert in support of Japanese people during recovery after heavily destructive earthquake in the east of Japan.

On 25 April 2012 she was a special guest of the "Side by Side" film festival invited by its organizer Manny de Guerre and performed in the Closing Ceremony. On 5 August she was invited by the Oryol’s mayor Sergey Stupin to hold a gala concert "Happy Birthday, Oryol!" at the main city square together with the singer Vladimir Presnyakov.

In the autumn of 2013 her protest clip against adolescent suicide "You And Me / Ty So Mnoy, Ya S Toboy" shot in Moscow and New York City earned more than 1 million views on YouTube.

Elya Chavez performs in Russia as well as abroad and supports the LGBT movement.
