= Side by Side (film festival) =

LGBTQ film festival in Russia

"Side by Side" Lesbian and Gay International Film Festival (Russian: Международный ЛГБТ-Кинофестиваль «Бок о бок», romanized: Bok o bok) is an international film festival that seeks to explore the issues of homosexuality, bisexuality and transgender (LGBT) through art cinema. Since 2008 it has taken place every autumn in Saint Petersburg, Russia. In addition, various special events are held almost every month, and since 2009 film showings and discussions have also been conducted in other parts of Russia.

== Concept ==
The Side by Side film festival aims to establish an open cultural space in which Russian society and the LGBT community can enter into a broad discussion and generate a positive dialogue, thus contributing to the struggle against discrimination based on sex, gender identity and sexual orientation. In addition, the festival offers a space where homosexual and transgender persons can feel comfortable with themselves and affirm, question and extend their identities. The slogan of the film forum is "Different love, equal rights".

The film festival was founded by Manny de Guerre. The Side by Side festival staff are Manny de Guerre, Gulya Sultanova and Tanya Shmankevich.

The festival program consists of three main sections, all of them with corresponding awards: feature, documentary and short film. Films are selected from the previous season's film forums and through application process. The non-competition program includes a variety of events: unique retrospective screenings, exhibitions, photo competitions, book presentations, concerts, workshops etc. The screenings are usually followed by a discussion or lecture to reflect issues raised by the film and to discuss how they are projected in contemporary Russian society. Every event hosts special guests, well-known international and Russian experts in the field of art, sociology, psychology or human rights. They form a jury which selects the award winners in all three categories. The festival visitors can also vote for their own favorite for the Audience Award.

The film festival actively seeks to attract volunteers during events. Over the years the film festival has been supported by the Berlin International Film Festival’s Teddy Award, Kyiv International Film Festival Molodist, Goethe-Institut, the Danish Cultural Institute, the Swedish Film Institute, Heinrich Böll Foundation, Time Out journal, among others.

== Background ==
Having begun in the late 1980s, the Russian gay and lesbian rights movement came to very little by mid-1990s. By the 21st century, neither a human rights movement nor an LGBT community as a group of people, united by common values and conscious of the shared cultural and historical fate, had been formed. Started in 2006, the Gay Pride Movement strengthened the disagreements between different LGBT groups and with society at large. Moreover, it did not pursue the goal of establishing a cultural space.

At that time LGBT culture was developing fast in the West, also in the area of art cinema. In 1977, the first LGBT film festival Frameline was held in San Francisco. Ten years later in 1987, a special LGBT film award was created at the Berlin International Film Festival. Over time, LGBT film forums have become an integral part of cultural life in Western societies. A great number of festivals, visited by thousands of people, run every year, and the most prestigious of them have their own gay award.

Side by Side Film Festival emerged, on the one hand, in the wake of the worldwide traditions, and on the other, as a response to the urgent needs of the Russian LGBT community. The organizers strived to create an open cultural space for the self-development and reflection of the LGBT community while at the same time exposing the problems of the LGBT community known to the general public by building a positive dialogue between the minority and the majority, deconstructing myths and stereotypes, helping to change the public opinion and develop understanding, acceptance and tolerance. According to the organizers this is one of the ways to overcome hate, discrimination and violence towards LGBT people.

== 1st Side by Side LGBT Film Festival (2008) ==
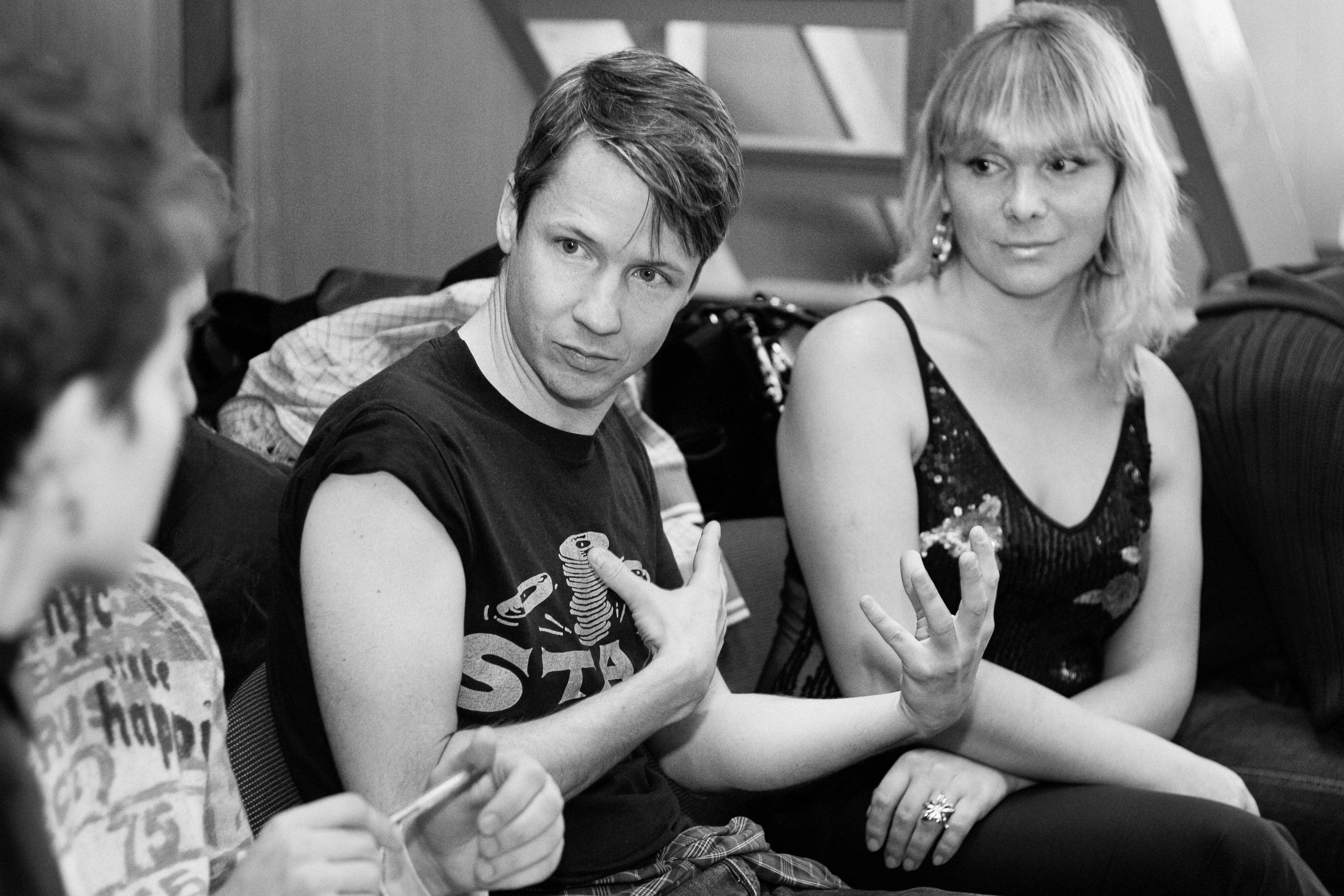
John Cameron Mitchell.

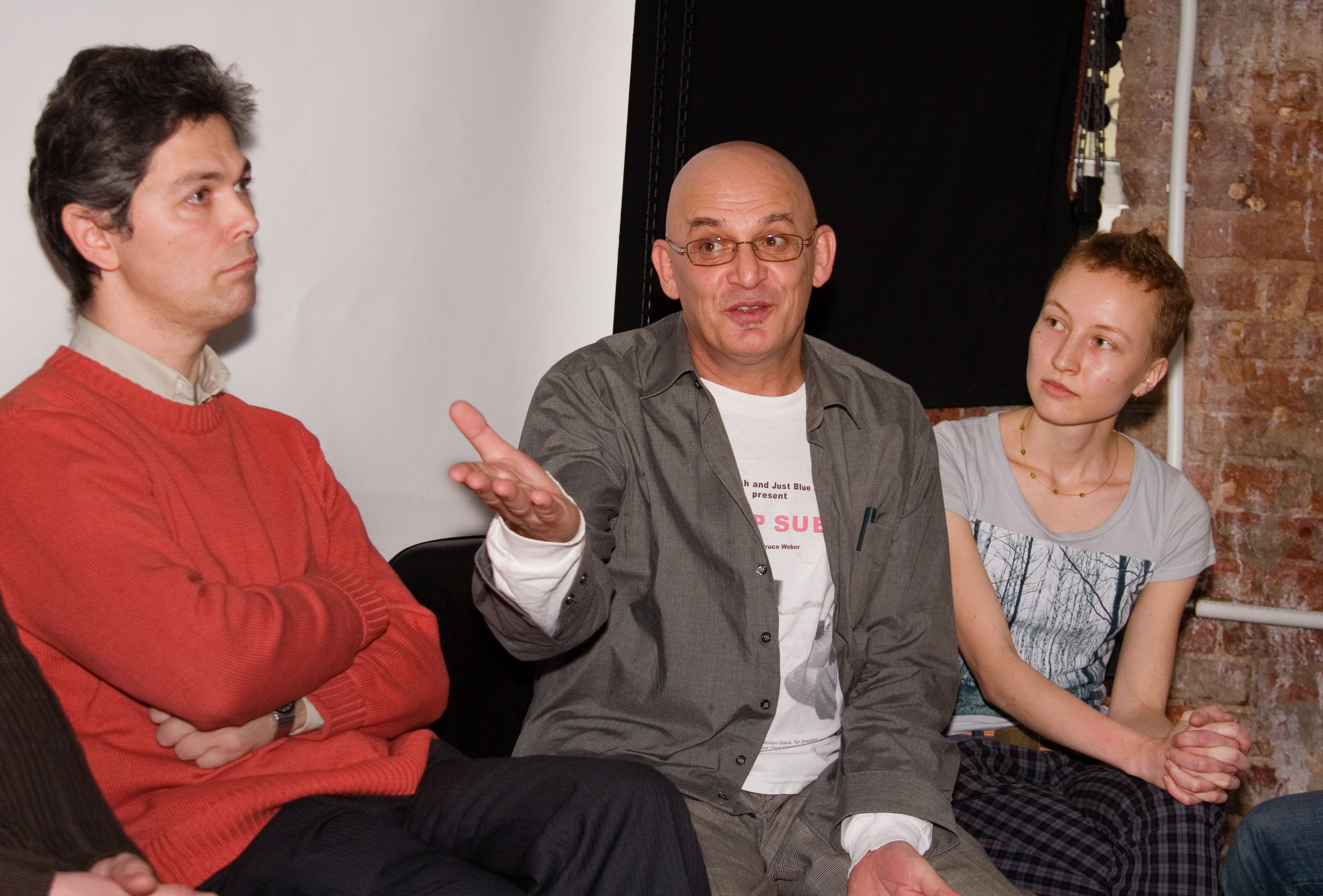
Dimitri Isayev, Klaus Mabel Ascheneller.

The idea of running a film festival in Saint Petersburg first came up in a meeting between Manny de Guerre and Irina Sergeyeva in the summer of 2007. A wide resonance and heated discussions arose in society as the plan of organizing the festival was announced publicly at the end of December.

Director Alexandr Sokurov, rock musician Svetlana Surganova, sociologist Igor Kon, poet Marina Chen, actor Anatoliy Ravikovich, human rights defender Sergey Grigoryants, politician Valeriya Novodvorskaya, British novelist Sarah Waters, British human rights defender Peter Tatchell, Israeli producer Eytan Fox, Israeli producer Gal Uchovsky, American producer John Cameron Mitchell, and LGBT-activist Nikolay Alexeyev gave their support to the film festival. Berlin International Film Festival, NewFest: New York Lesbian, Gay, Bisexual, & Transgender Film Festival, and Kyiv International Film Festival Molodist officially supported «Side by Side» Film Festival.

Representatives of The International Association of Cinematographers of Slavic and Orthodox People, actors Nikolai Burlyayev and Mikhail Porechenkov, producer Mark Rudinshtein, artist Oleg Basilashvili, director Yevgeniy Tatarskiy, head of the press service of the Russian Orthodox Church Mikhail Moiseyev, and the head of the city committee for culture Nikolay Burov were against the film festival.

In February 2008, Dom Kino cinema, the planned venue for the screenings, terminated the preliminary agreement with the festival organizers due to "building repairs". However, as it turned out later, the movie hall was never closed during the period. In September 2008, already after the beginning of ticket sale, PIK cinema under pressure from authorities terminated the contract without explanations. At the same time the police were conducting spot-checks at Bunker and Central Station gay clubs, during which the visitors were insulted, humiliated, and blackmailed. In October 2008, the new venues that had been found (clubs Sochi and The Palace) were closed on the eve of the festival for two weeks by fire inspections. However, right after refusing to host the event they were allowed to carry on working.

After these events, civil youth movements Oborona and LGBT-organization Coming Out sent an open letter to the governor of Saint Petersburg Valentina Matviyenko demanding that she comment on the situation. Famous St. Petersburg artists Gljuklja and Caplja also expressed their support. After hearing about the closure of the festival, they changed their programme at Dom Kino and screened a film about transgender boys Komnata Viki i Zheni. Furthermore, referring to the German reformer Martin Luther, a student group performed an action called Reformation at the Committee for Culture of Saint Petersburg.

As a result, the film festival took place ‘underground’ in a secret venue from 4 to 5 October 2008. In the course of two days art and documentary films were screened, including a panorama of Berlin International Film Festival short movie award winners. The screenings were followed by discussions in which the festival guests director John Cameron Mitchell, Rodney Swell, Maxim Zirin, representatives of the Berlin International Film Festival's Teddy Award Klaus Ascheneller and New Fest Director Basil Tsiokos, and Russian transgender Julietta among others participated. In addition, there was a photo competition (Love in pink and blue measurement), Lida Mikhailovaya's photo project: "I am lesbian. Do people around me know about it?" and Alexander Nizovskiy's "Drag Queens Show."

The competition program consisted of eight feature, eight documentary and twenty-three short films, including Oscar, Cannes Film Festival and Berlin International Film Festival award winners. Among them there was one Russian documentary tape and one Kazakhstan short film.

=== Jury ===
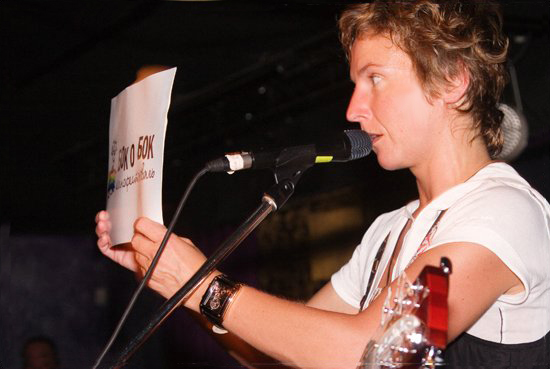
Svetlana Surganova.

- Klaus Mabel Aschenneller – producer of the annual premium «Teddy Award» within the framework of the Berlin International Film Festival.
- Svetlana Surganova – famous Russian rock musician, founder of «Nochniye Snaiperi» and «Surganova and Orchestra»
- Basil Tsiokos – artistic director of the New York Lesbian, Gay, Bisexual, & Transgender Film Festival, a member of the International Jury of the Berlin International Film Festival.

=== Awards ===
- The best feature film – XXY by director Lucía Puenzo, Argentina 2007.
- The best documentary film – Anyone and Everyone by director Susan Polis Schutz, USA 2007.
- The best short-footage film – No Bikini by director Claudia Morgado Escanilla, Canada 2007.
- Audience Award – Another's Body by director Maxim Zirin, Russia 2008.

=== Following events ===
Furthermore, the film program was shown at various venues in the city as well as presented in several film festivals: Kiev International Film Festival Molodist, Open Your Eyes Film Festival Against Xenophobia and Racism, Festival of Festivals International Film Festival in St. Petersburg, and German Week in Saint Petersburg. Organizer Manny de Guerre was invited to the 59th Berlin International Film Festival as a member of the Teddy Award jury. In September 2009, Gyulnara Sultanova together with the representative for the Russian LGBT Network Igor Kochetkov had a meeting with Igor Mikhailov, Human Rights Ombudsman in Saint Petersburg who granted his support for them.

In addition, educational brochures about coming out (How to tell? and How to understand?) and "Parenthood. Transgender. Religion" were released. In summer, 2009 Side by Side was invited to participate in Festival of Festivals. Under pressure, the administration of cinema Rodina refused to conduct the screening. However, the cinema Dom Kino accepted to show the film with the condition that the LGBT film festival would not be mentioned.

== 2nd Side by Side LGBT Film Festival (2009) ==
The second film festival ran from 23 to 31 October 2009. Unlike the year before, it did not provoke such a strong reaction in society, and the screenings took place in public venues. The organizers had sought support from Western consulates and cultural centers to ensure the film festival would not be disrupted. According to the organizers, the festival was visited by more than two thousand people. Besides the film screenings, several roundtable discussions were organized on various issues: human rights and discrimination, the history of the LGBT-community, coming out, same-sex marriage, children with same-sex parents, problems of elderly LGBT people, transgender myths and reality, masculinity in contemporary society, religion and sexuality, among others. Sociologist Igor Kon, psychotherapist Dmitriy Isaev, LGBT activist Igor Kochetkov, artist Ivan Chechot, German activist Mahide Lein, HIV activist Nikolai Panchenko, poet-performer Olga Krauze, human rights defenders Alexander Vinnikov, Vladimir Shnitke, Maxim Ivanozov, and Nina Tagankina, among others.

However, the event did not pass without incidents. Before the presentation of the book Malchik — otets muzhchiny by Igor Kon, correspondents of NTV and a group of nationalists led by Roman Zentsov showed up in the hall where a discussion was to take place. The festival organizers accused the NTV correspondents of an attempt to create a scandal.

Outside the competition program a retrospective of German cinema from the Weimar Republic was shown: Different from the Others - the first gay movie in the history of cinema, Mädchen in Uniform – the first movie to touch the theme of female homosexuality, and cult film Michael. The film forum was closed with a concert by Ulyana Angelevskaya.

Due to the disruption of the previous year's festival, the 2008 program was partly repeated in 2009. In total, four feature, six documentary and twelve short films were shown.

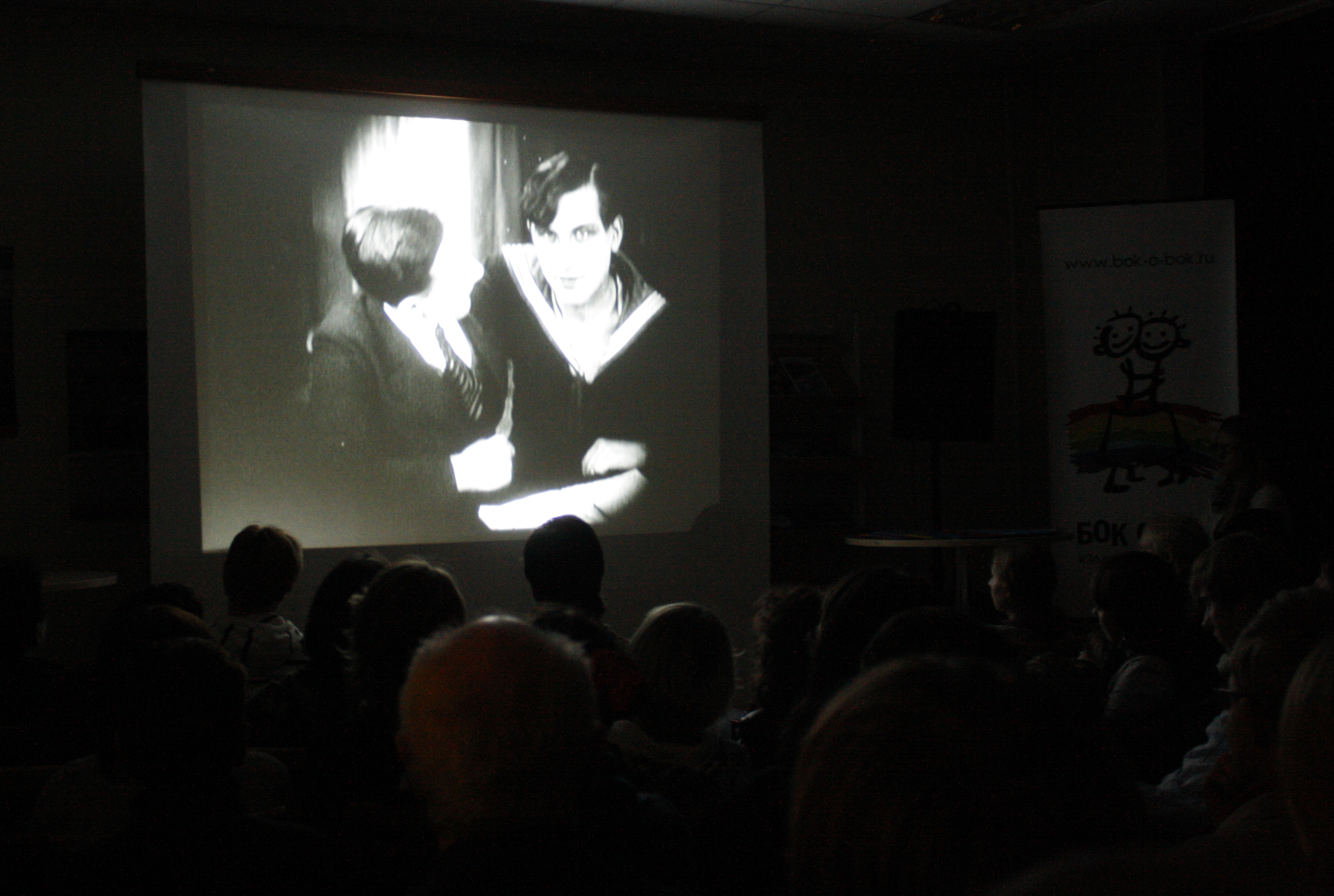

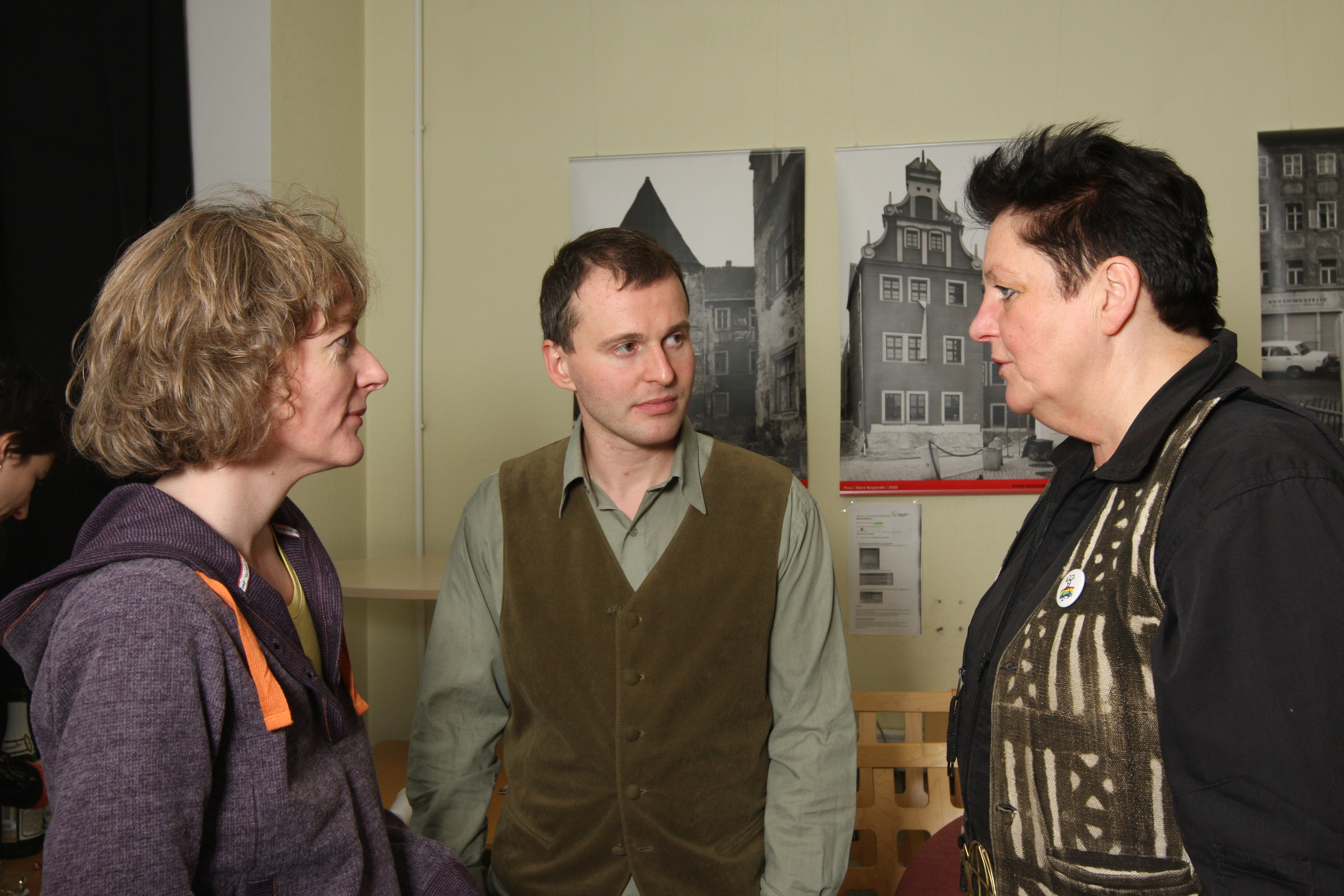

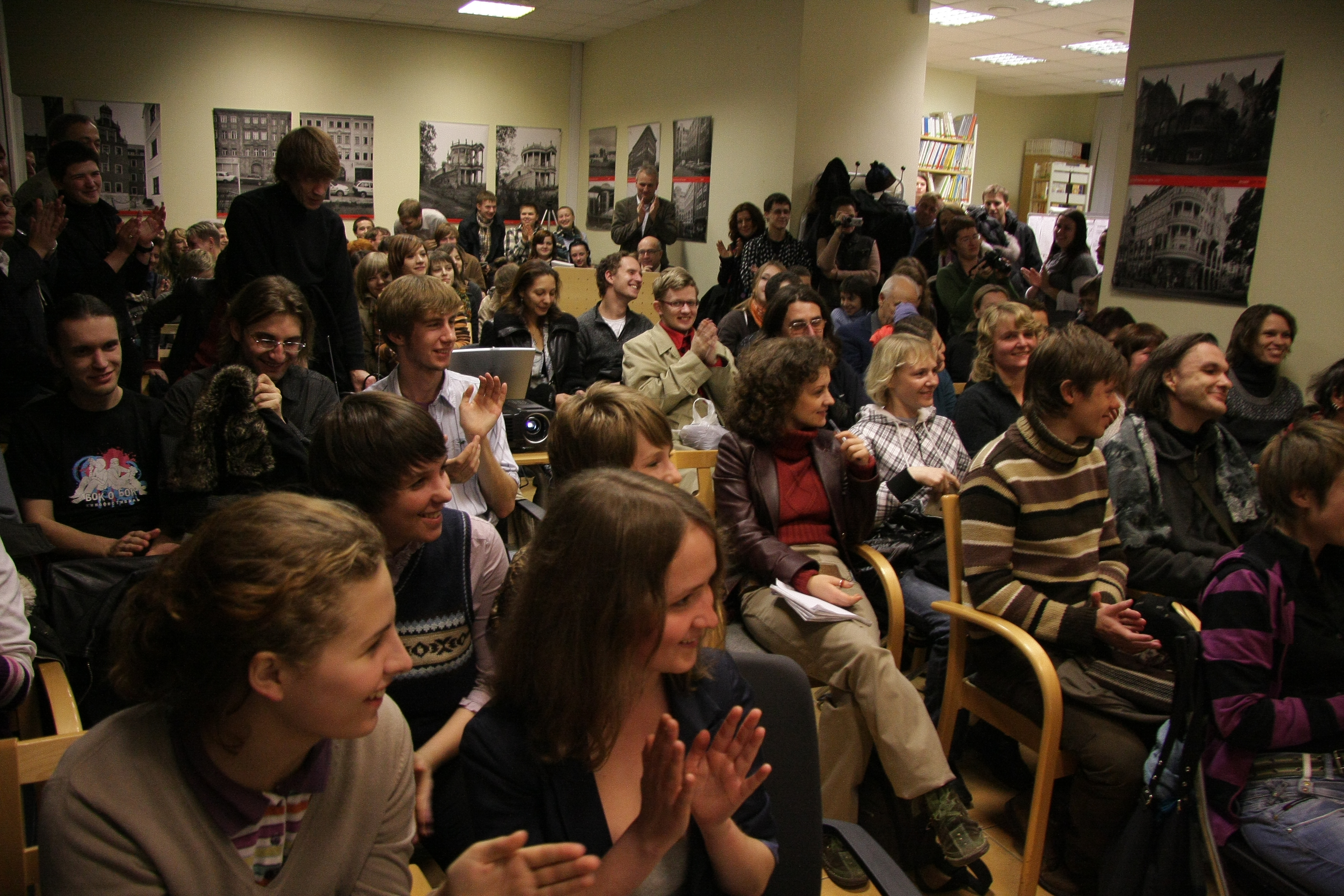

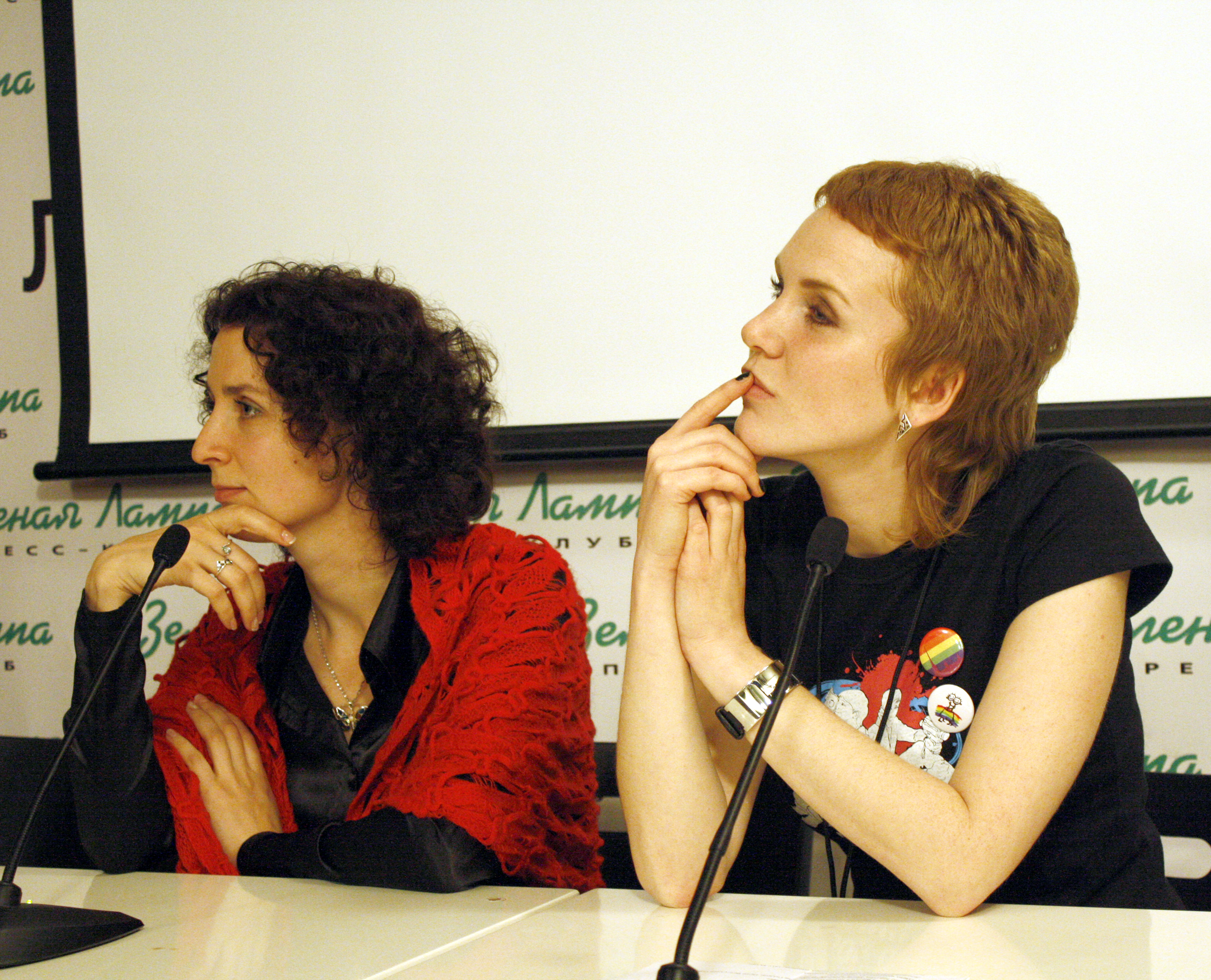

=== Jury ===
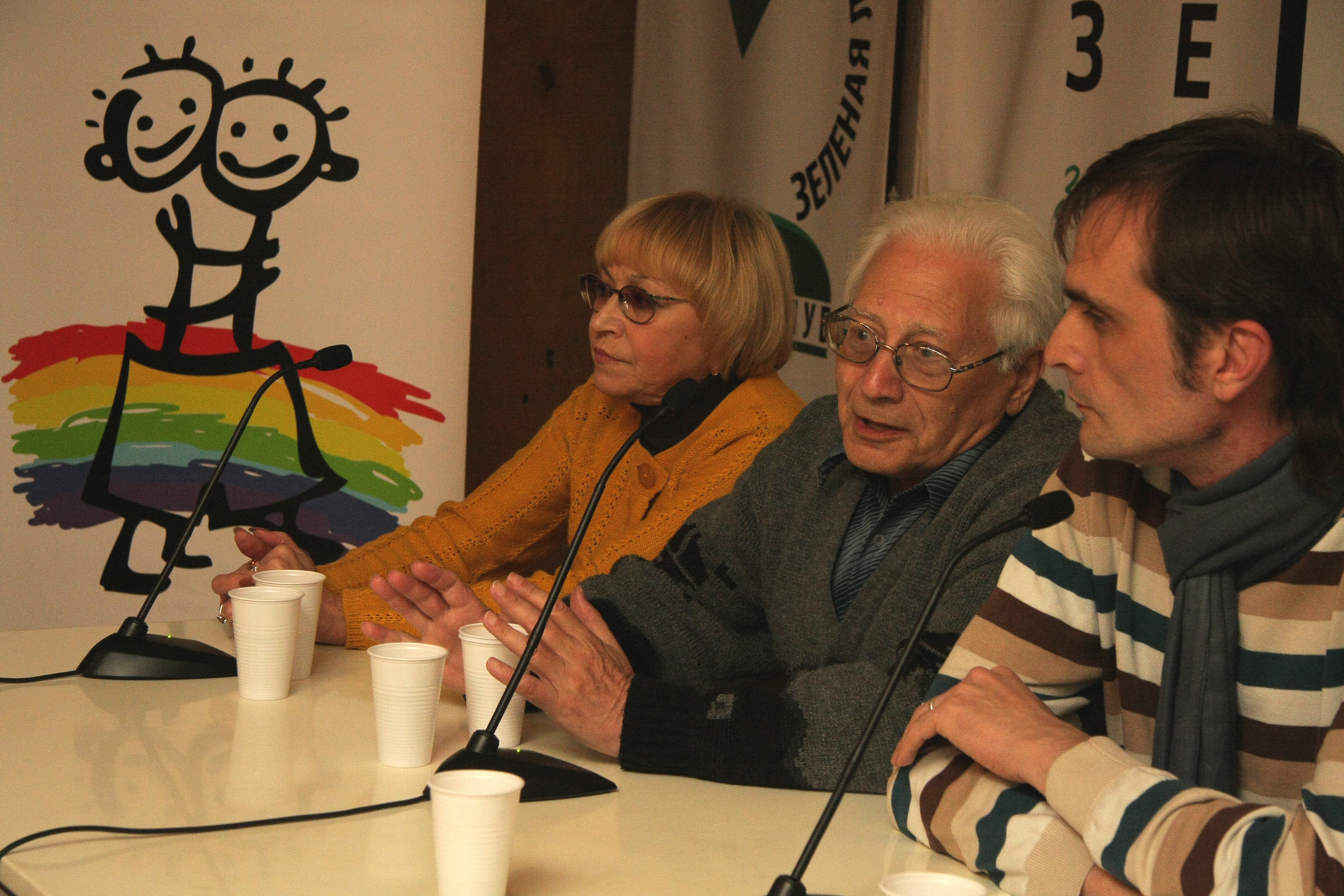
Nina Tagankina, Igor Kon, Igor Kochetkov.

- Igor Kon – famous Russian sociologist and philosopher
- Tamara Larina – artistic director of International Short Film and Animation Festival Open Cinema
- Nina Tagankina – human rights defender, executive director of Moscow Helsinki Group
- Sergey Baidak – project leader of Inoekino

=== Awards ===
Due to the partial repetition of the previous year's program, the award system was reorganized:

- The best social film – Freeheld, directed by Cynthia Wade, USA 2007
- The best educational film – I Am Gay, directed by Nicolas Kolovos, Sweden 2008
- The best film about human value – Georgie Girl, directed by Annie Goldson and Peter Wells, New Zealand 2001
- The audience award – Mädchen in Uniform, directed by Leontine Sagan, Germany 1931

=== Following events ===
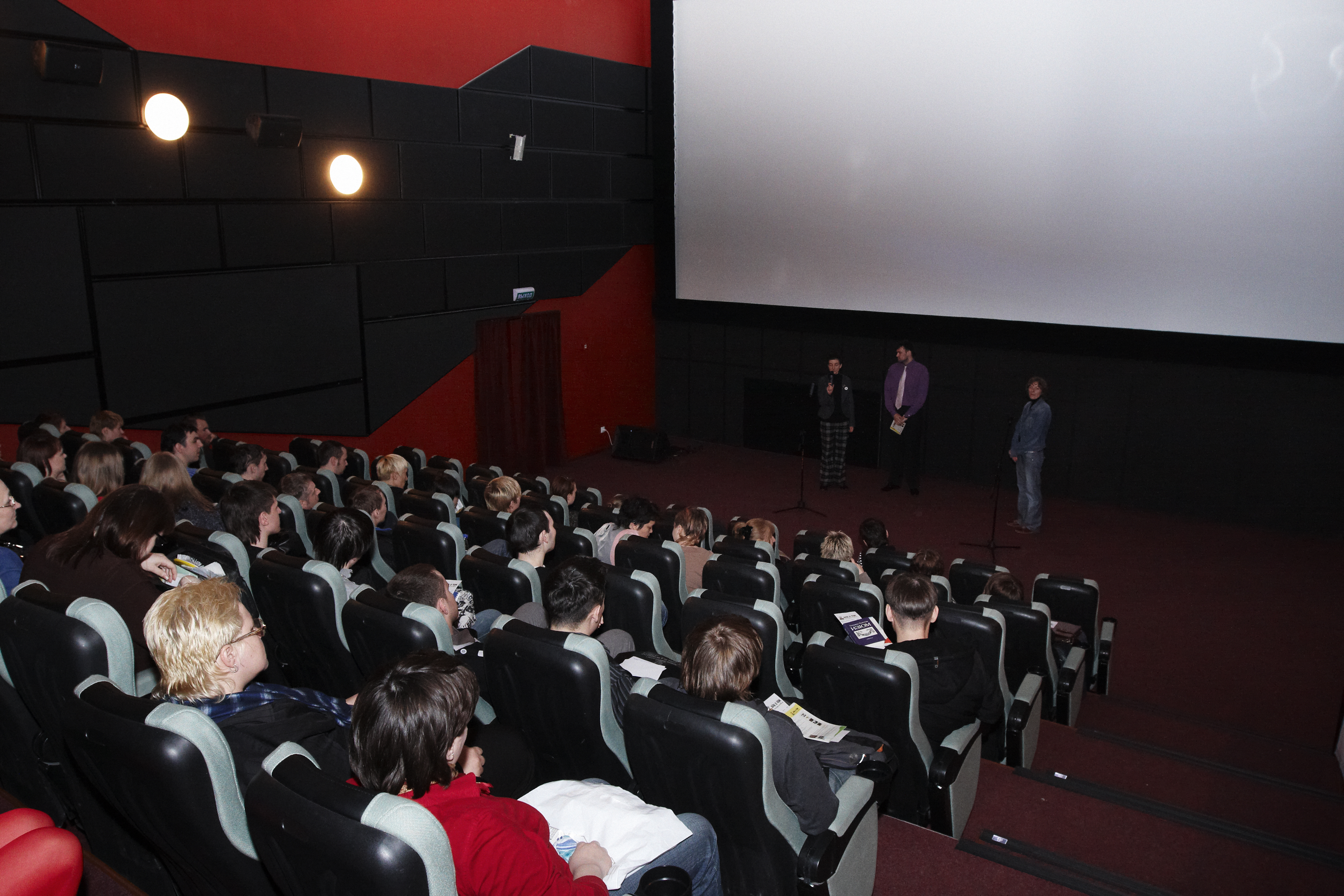
Novosibirsk.

The International Gay and Lesbian Film Festival Side by Side received an award at the Berlin International Film Festival for the contribution to the development of LGBT movement in Russia, a few weeks before director Gulya Sultanova became a member of the jury at the Berlinale's Teddy Award. In spring 2010, Side by Side Film Festival also took part in the International Film Festival Against Racism and Xenophobia "Open Your Eyes!" With the film Georgie Girl. The screening was a major success.

In April 2010, Stephen Fry’s film HIV & Me was shown as part of the Week Against Homophobia. The actor also made an appeal to the Russian public. That same month, Side by Side International Gay and Lesbian Film Festival travelled outside the city, to Kemerovo and Novosibirsk. In Novosibirsk the festival ran from 15 to 18 April with the support of the Department for Culture of Novosibirsk Oblast and the Goethe-Institut. It attracted a great deal of spectators and media attention, and the events gathered around 700 visitors. In Kemerovo the film screenings were to take place from the 17th to 19 April in two official city cinemas. To begin with the city administration supported the festival but changed its position fundamentally one day before the festival opening. As a result, both cinemas refused to rent out their halls but the festival took nevertheless place in private venues.

"According to the 5th clause of the Universal Declaration of Human Rights everyone has a right to run and visit a cultural event. We realized this right in Novosibirsk — and it was a bright and successful event in the cultural and public life of the capital of Siberia. We met discrimination in Kemerovo. However, we shall continue our work to realize our rights." The founder of the film festival Manny de Guerre.

In July, a festival was planned in Arkhangelsk with support of the local LGBT organization Rakurs. However, because of religious and nationalist groups’ pressure on local authorities, it took place at an undisclosed venue.

The screening of the film Cut Homophobia took place on 18 September 2010 as part of the 2nd International Queer Culture Festival. It was followed by discussion under the topic "Injustice. Lawlessness. Discrimination. Are Russia Artists Concerned with these Issues?"

== 3rd Side by Side LGBT Film Festival (2010) ==
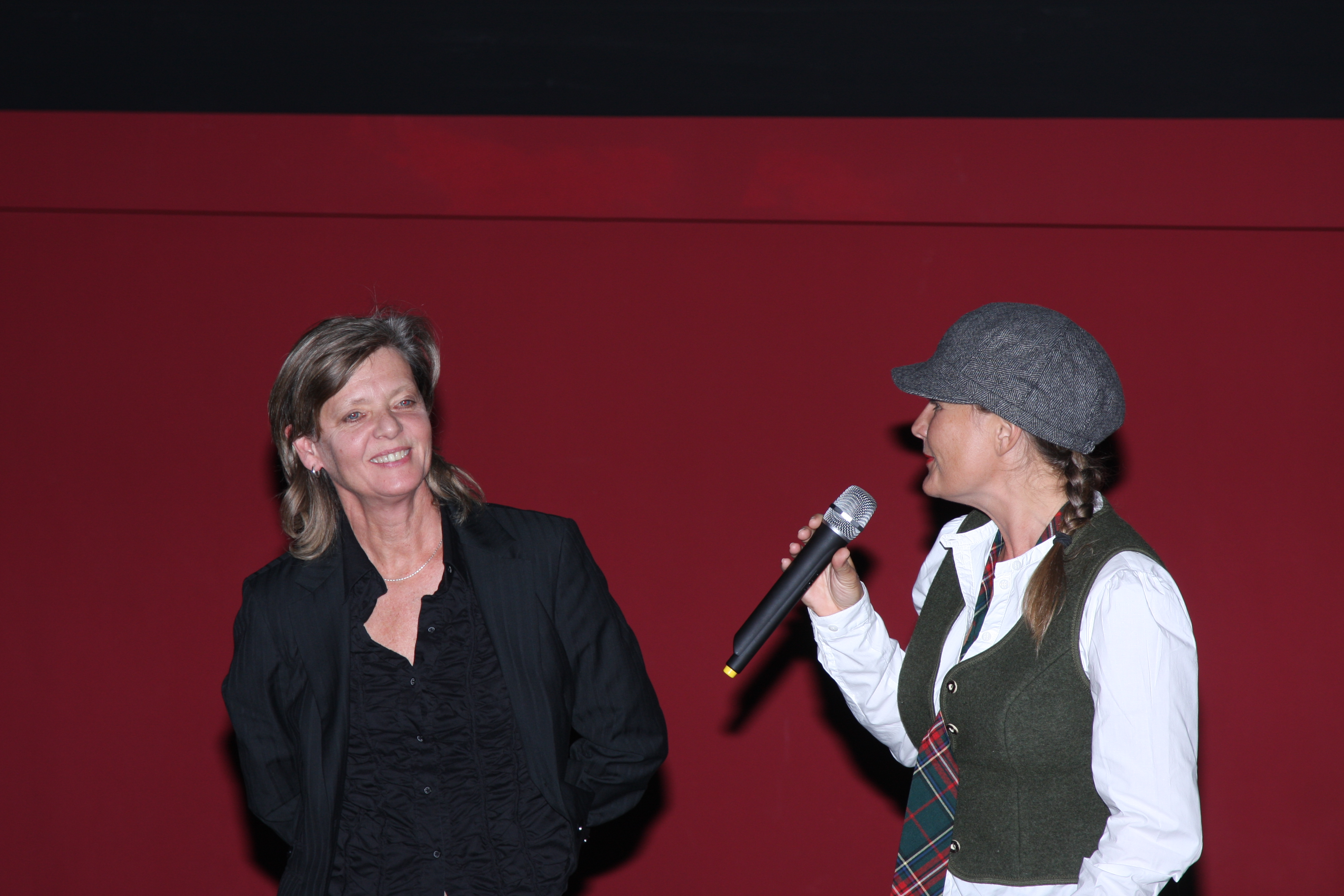
Filmmakers Iben Haahr Andersen and Minna Grooss.

The festival was planned to run from the 15th to 23 October in 2010 and it was supported by Spanish director Pedro Almodóvar, American screenwriter and director Gus Van Sant, British director Ken Loach, British actor, director and writer Stephen Fry, Russian actor and artist Sergei Bugaev (Afrika), and film critic Mikhail Trofimenkov. Later on they were joined by British actor Ian McKellen, Commissioner for Human Rights at the Council of Europe Thomas Hammarberg, British writer and director Mike Leigh, singer Marc Almond, and American director Bruce LaBruce.

In 2010 the film festival passed without incidents in public venues. For the first time animations were included in the program. An exhibition of LGBT film festival posters from Europe, Asia, the Americas and Africa was also held, in order to visually show the history of the development of such festivals. The non-competition program under the name of "Love Behind the Iron Curtain" presented vintage films shot in the countries from the former Eastern Bloc: the Hungarian film Another way from 1982 by Károly Makk; Westler, a film from West Germany by Wieland Speck; and Coming out by Heiner Carow, which was the first and last gay film produced in the German Democratic Republic as it was released only a few hours before the Berlin Wall fell.

The festival was visited by special guests: Swedish animator Lasse Persson, German actor Matthias Freihof, Israeli director Tomer Heymann, Danish directors Iben Haar Andersen and Minna Gross, Turkish transgender activist, heroine of the movie Me and Nuri Bula, transsexual Esmeray, Russian director Dmitriy Gribanov, and film critic Oleg Kovalov. Roundtable discussions were held about children in same-sex families, transgender rights in Russia and Turkey, homophobia in society, movement for LGBT rights in Russia and the world, among others.

This year the film festival found a visual embodiment for its award called BoBik (an analogue of the Berlin bear Teddy and the Venetian Queer Lion). The prototype of Bobik was festival founder Manny de Guerre's dog. The name comes from the abbreviation for the festival "Bok o Bok" ("Side by Side" in Russian).

The competition program consisted of four features including one Russian, four documentaries and fourteen short films. For the first time, there was also an animation section presented with twelve films.

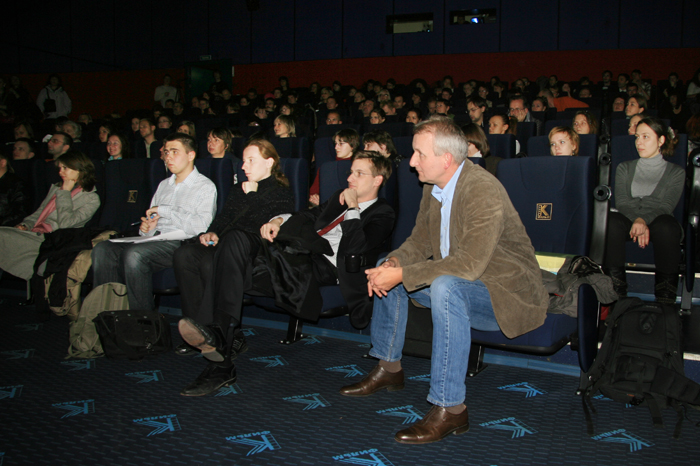

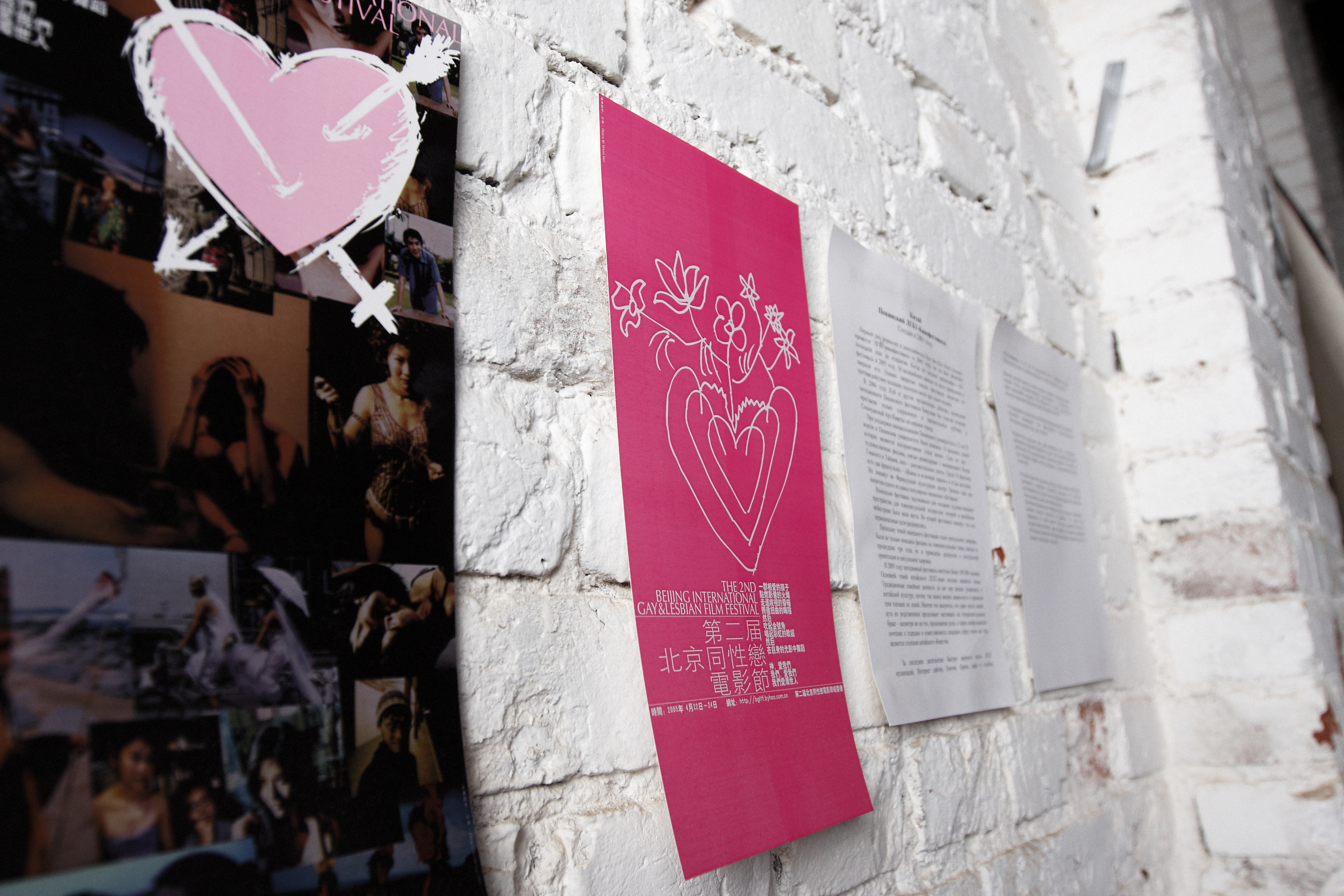

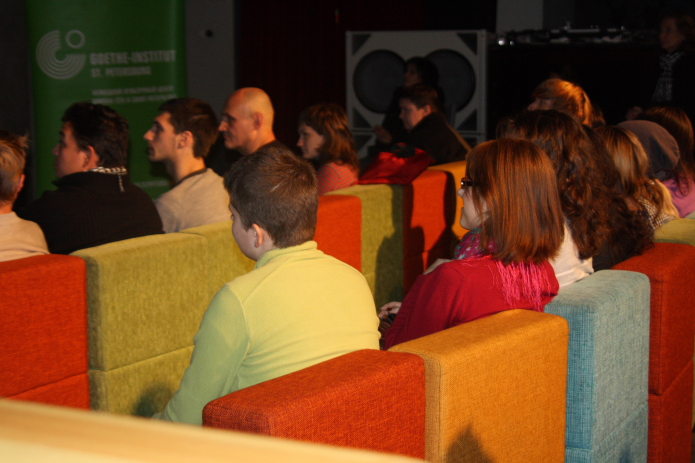

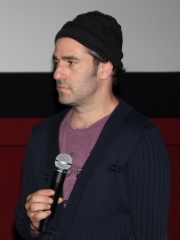

=== Jury ===
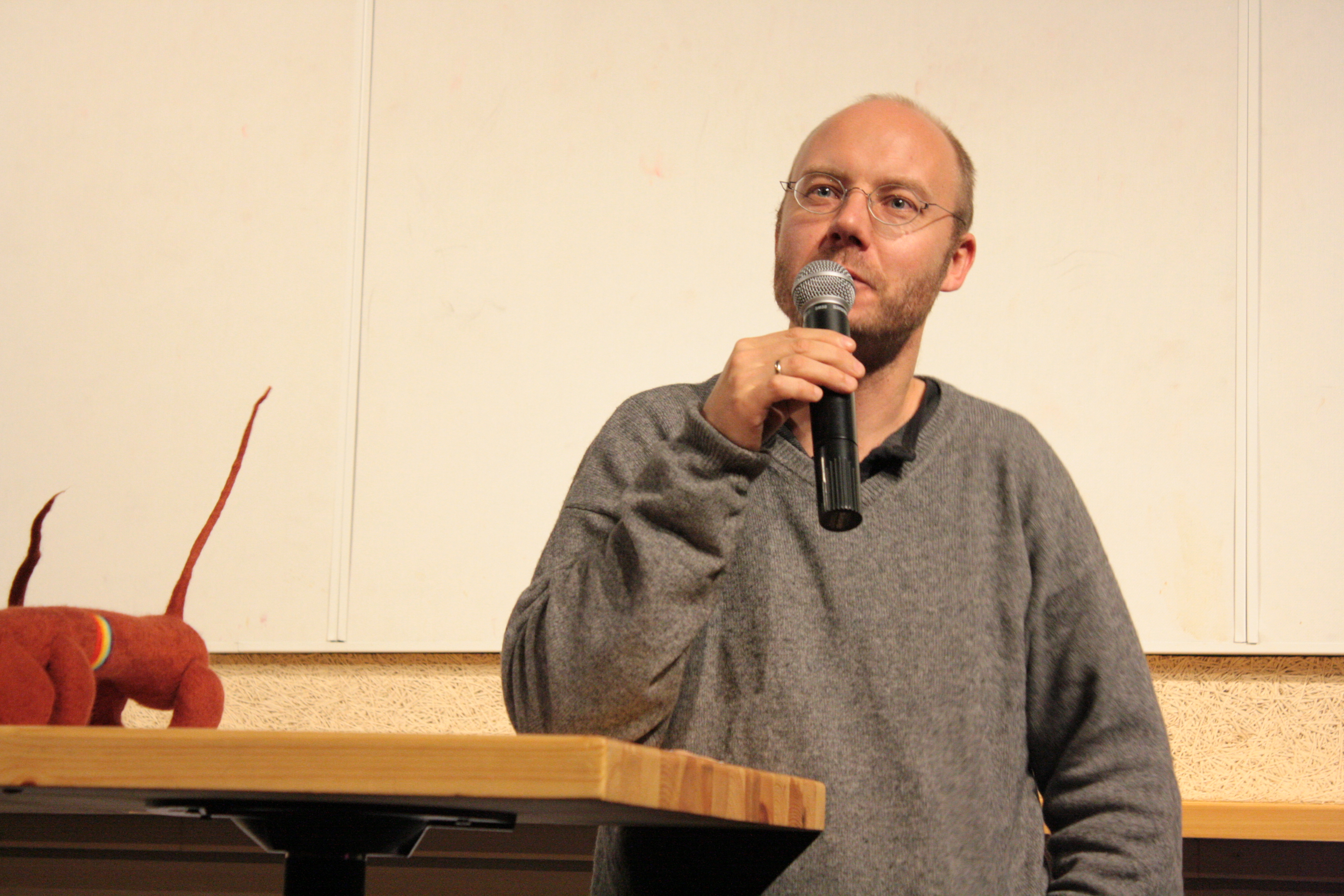
Antoine Cattin.

- Gljuklja (Natalya Pershina-Yakimanskaya) – artist, director, scriptwriter from Saint Petersburg
- Serge Golovach – artist, photographer and public figure from Moscow*
- Dmitriy Dubrokskiy – human rights defender and civic activist, teacher at Saint Petersburg State University and Smolny College of Liberal Arts and Sciences
- Antoine Cattin – film-documentalist, editor of Hors-Champ film journal. Known in Russia for his co-work with Pavel Kostomapov

=== Awards ===
- The best feature film – My Friend from Faro, directed by Nana Neul, Germany 2008
- The best documentary – I shot my love, directed by Tomer Heymann Israel / Germany 2010
- The best short film – Hammerhead, directed by Samuel Donovan, United Kingdom 2009
- The best animation – Hand in Hand, directed by Lasse Persson, Sweden 1996
- The audience award – Hello, My Name Is Lesbian, directed by Iben Haahr Andersen & Minna Gross, Denmark 2009

=== Following events ===
In December 2010, Side by Side showed the film Freeheld as part of the Film Festival 32 May, which displeased some authorities of the Saint Petersburg administration.

At the end of March 2009, the film forum planned to participate Open Your Eyes Film Festival with the film Prayers for Bobby. However, the city cinema halls Dom Kino and Rodina refused to conduct the screenings "on ideological grounds" and after pressure from the prosecutor broke the rental contract with the Mikhail Chemyakin Foundation. As part of the German Week, a photo exhibition and screening took place.

This year a series of screenings was successfully completed in Novosibirsk and Kemerovo, in February on the issue of coming out and in April as part of the Week Against Homophobia. In May the film festival showed its program of 2010 in open venues and unlike the year before, this time the event passed without incidents.

A tour to Tomsk was planned for June 2011 but on the opening day the venues refused to conduct the screenings under pressure from local administration, as a result of which the film forum was moved to other venues.

== 4th Side by Side LGBT Film Festival (2011) ==
=== Awards ===
- Best Feature: Harvest (Benjamin Cantu, Germany, 2011)
- Best Documentary: Regretters (Marcus Lindeen, Sweden, 2010)
- Best Short Film: Mind (Emma Crimmings, Аustralia, 2011)
- Special Jury Prize: Generations (Barbara Hammer & Gina Carducci, USA, 2011)
- Audience Prize: Patrik 1.5 (Ella Lemhagen, Sweden, 2008)

== 5th Side by Side LGBT film festival (2012) ==
=== Awards ===
- Best Feature: Beauty (Oliver Hermanus, South Africa, France, Germany, 2011)
- Best Documentary: Call Me Kuchu (Malika Zouhali-Worrall & Katherine Fairfax Wright, USA, Uganda, 2012)
- Best Short Film: La Douche (The Shower) (Maria José San Martín, Chile, 2011)
- Audience Prize: Codebreaker (Clare Beaven, UK, 2011)

== 6th Side by Side LGBT film festival (2013) ==
=== Awards ===
- The best feature film – Blue is the Warmest Colour, directed by Abdellatif Kechiche, France 2013
- The best documentary – Valentine Road, directed by Marta Cunningham, USA 2013
- The best short film – Undress Me (Victor Lindgren, Sweden, 2013)
- The audience award – Matterhorn (Diederik Ebbinge, Netherlands, 2013)

== 7th Side by Side LGBT film festival (2014) ==
=== Awards ===
- The best feature film – Julia, directed by Jackie J. Deier, Germany
- The best documentary – Something Must Break, Sweden
- The best short film – Who are They?, directed by Olga Privolnova, Russia
- The audience award – Matt Shepard is a Friend of Mine, USA

== 8th Side by Side LGBT film festival (2015) ==
=== Awards ===
- The best feature film – The Chambermaid Lynn, directed by Ingo Haeb, Germany, 2014
- The best documentary – Sounds from the Fog, directed by Klaus Stanjek, Austria, Germany and Czech Republic, 2013
- The best short film – I'm Black, I'm Queer and I am a Whore (Hugo Meijer & Cas van der Pas, Colombia, Netherlands, 2012)
- The audience award – The Mask You Live In (Jennifer Siebel Newsom, USA, 2015)

== 9th Side by Side LGBT film festival (2016) ==
=== Awards ===
- The best feature film – Arianna, directed by Carlo Lavagna, Italy 2015
- The best documentary – Who's Gonna Love Me Now?, directed by Barak and Tomer Heymann, Israel-Britain 2016
- The best short film – Partners, directed by Joey Ally, USA, 2016
- The audience award – Angry Indian Goddesses directed by Pan Nalin, India, Germany, 2015

== See also ==
- List of LGBT film festivals
