= Diana Arbenina =

Russian singer (born 1974)

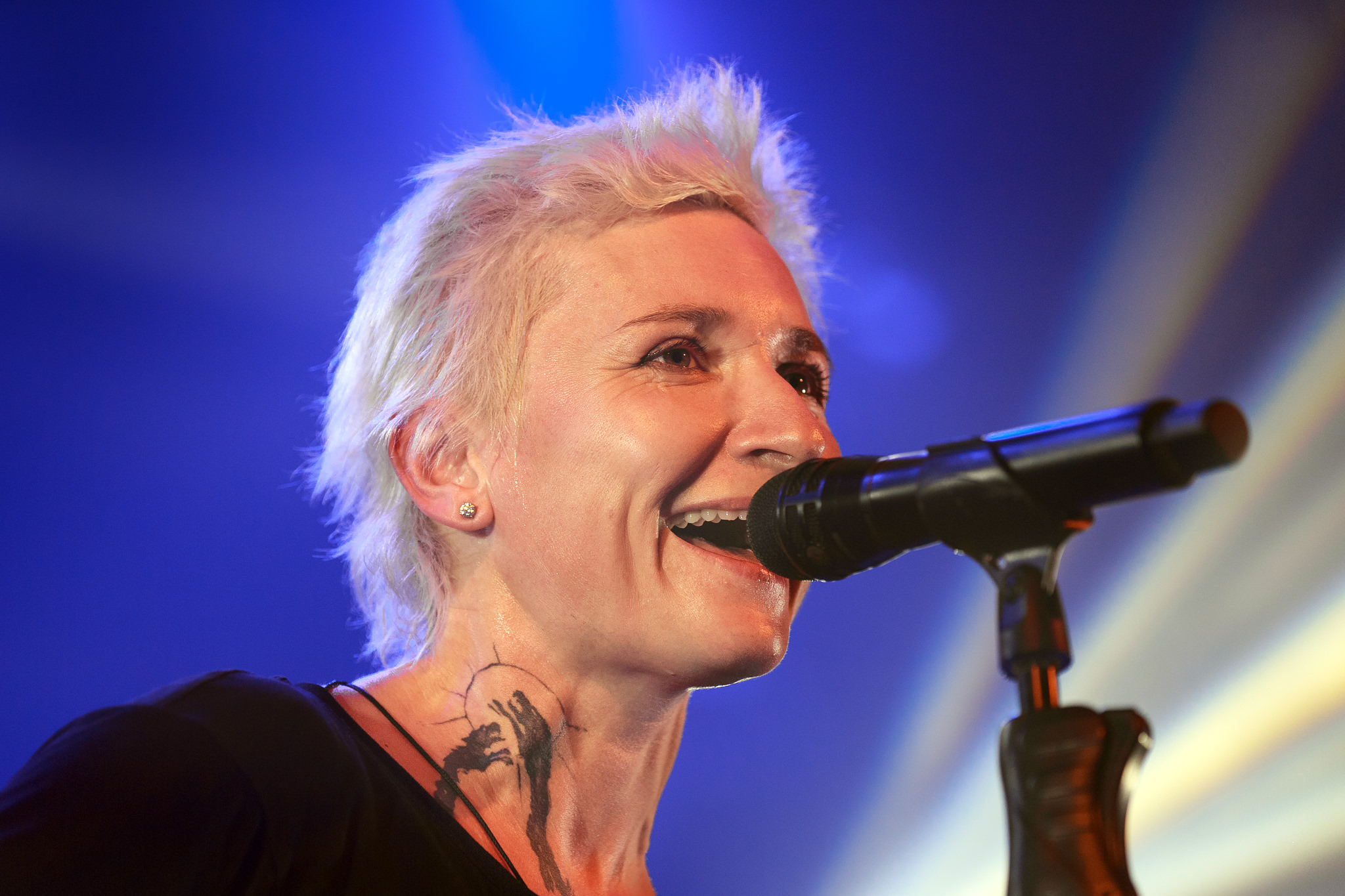
- Concert in Toronto (May 2018)

Background information
- Born: Diana Kulachenko; 8 July 1974 (age 51); Valozhyn, Minsk Region, Byelorussian Soviet Socialist Republic, Soviet Union
- Genres: rock, indie-rock, alternative-rock
- Occupations: Singer; Songwriter; Composer; Poet; Actor
- Instruments: voice, guitar, accordion, piano
- Years active: 1991–present
- Member of: Nochnye Snaipery
- Website: snipers.net

Diana Sergeyevna Arbenina (née Kulachenko, Belarusian: Дыяна Сяргееўна Кулачэнка; Russian: Диа́на Серге́евна Арбе́нина; born July 8, 1974) is a Russian singer, musician, poet, and leader of the rock group Nochnye Snaipery.

Arbenina is one of a few Russian rock artists who write and perform both in Russian and in English. Arbenina is a recipient of the “Triumph” Literature Prize and is also an official Russian ambassador for Gibson and the World Wildlife Fund.

== Biography ==
Arbenina was born in 1974 in Valozhyn, Minsk Region, Byelorussian Soviet Socialist Republic, Soviet Union to a family of journalists.

When Arbenina was 3 years old, her family moved to Barysaw then to the Russian Far East. She studied at the Magadan Pedagogical Institute at the Faculty of Foreign Languages, then at the Philology Department of Saint Petersburg State University. She began writing songs in the early 1990s.

In 1993, together with violinist Svetlana Surganova, she formed the group Nochnye Snaipery (Night Snipers). In 1993, she temporarily married Konstantin Arbenin, possibly to obtain Saint Petersburg residency. She soon divorced, but kept his last name.

In 2002, Surganova left Nochnye Snaipery and Arbenina became the only vocalist in the group.

In 2005, she received the title of Merited Artist of Chechen Republic.

On February 4, 2010, she gave birth to twins with the help of in vitro fertilisation.

In 2014, Arbenina's concerts in Russia were cancelled, reportedly ordered by the Kremlin, after Arbenina expressed sympathy with Ukraine following the annexation of Crimea by the Russian Federation.

=== Film appearances ===
Year	Film
2008	Radio Day (Russian)
2019	Mistresses (Russian)
