= Gulnara Sultanova =

Russian LGBT activist

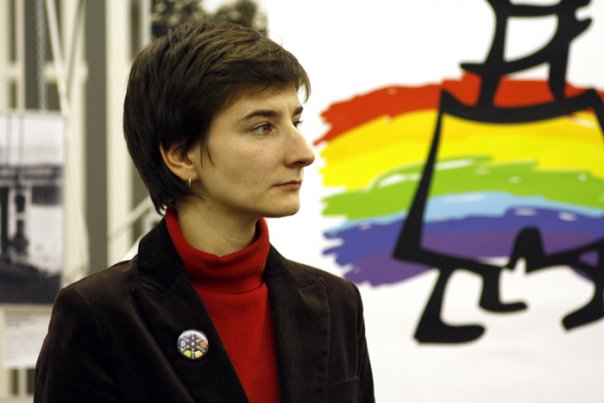
- Sultanova in 2009
- Born: August 23, 1975 (age 50)
- Occupations: Civilian and LGBT activist
- Known for: Director of the International LGBT-Film Festival Side by Side

Gulnara Yuryevna Sultanova (Russian: Гюльнара Юрьевна Султанова; born August 23, 1975) is a Russian civilian and LGBT activist, director of the International LGBT-Film Festival Side by Side and coordinator of the LGBT organization Coming Out and Russian-German Exchange. Known for numerous speeches in the media in connection with human rights issues regarding gays and lesbians. In 2010 she was a member of the jury of the Teddy Award of the Berlin Film Festival.
