= Svetlana Surganova =

Russian rock musician, singer and poet (born 1968)

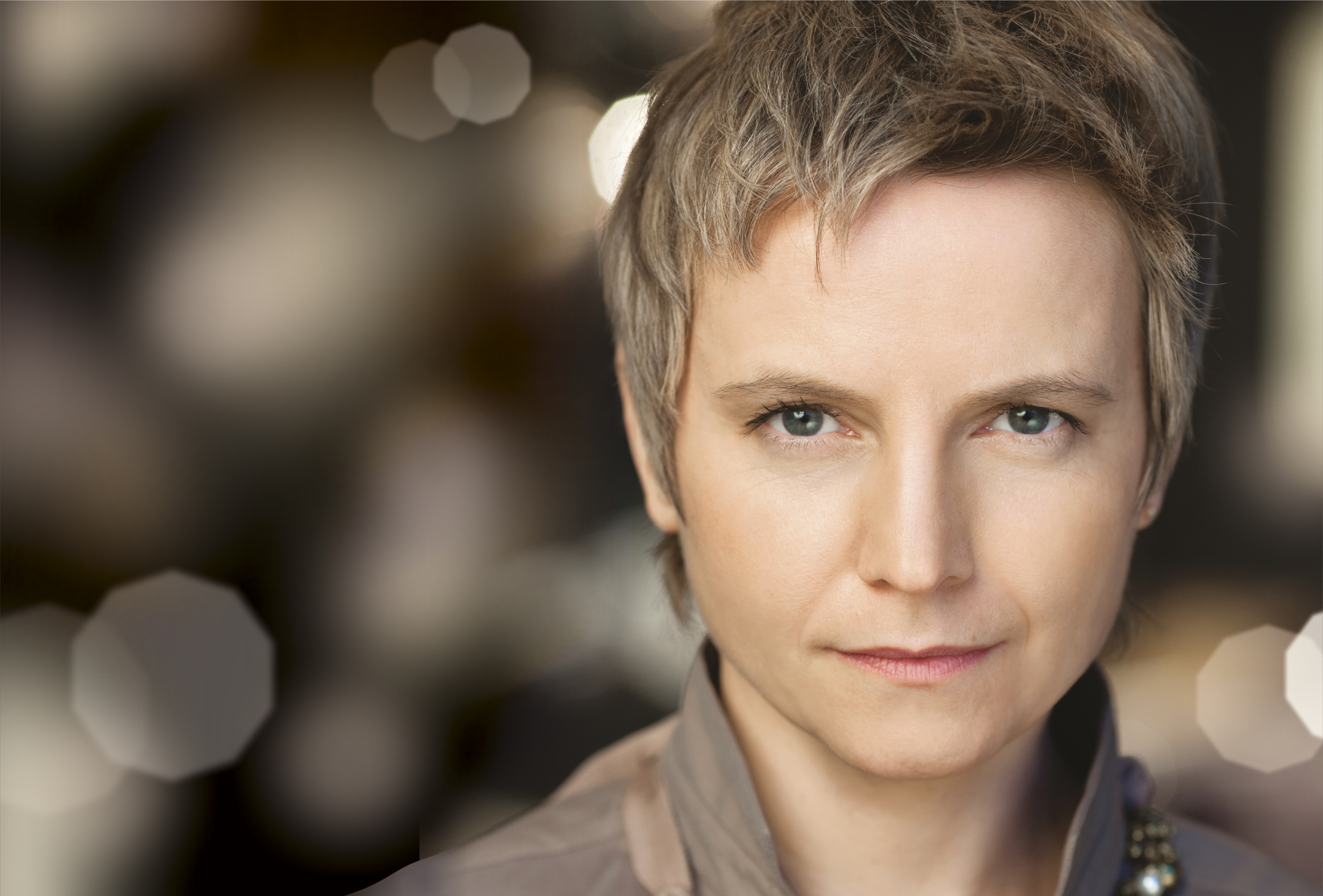
- Surganova in 2015

Background information
- Born: Svetlana Surganova; 14 November 1968 (age 58); Leningrad, Soviet Union
- Origin: Russia
- Genre: Rock
- Occupations: Singer; songwriter
- Instruments: Vocals; guitar; violin
- Years active: 1983–present
- Website: www.surganova.su

Svetlana Yakovlevna Surganova (Russian: Светлана Яковлевна Сурганова) (born 14 November 1968) is a Russian rock musician, singer and poet. She was a founding member of the popular Russian rock band Nochnye Snaipery, providing vocals and playing violin. Presently she is a founding member of "Surganova i Orkestr" band.

== Early years ==
Svetlana Surganova was born in Leningrad, on 14 November 1968. She has never seen her real parents: her biological mother refused her after birth. When Svetlana was three years old, she was adopted by Liya Davydovna Surganova, Candidate of Biological Sciences.
Svetlana Surganova started writing her own songs at 14. In the 9th grade she created her first musical band "Камертон" ("Camerton"). Her second band, "League", was formed during the period of study in a medical college.
From 1988 to 1996, Surganova had been a member of "Нечто иное" ("Something Else") band. As a sessional musician she took part in recording an album with "КузяBAND" from Murmansk.

== "Nochnye Snaipery" ==
In 1993 Svetlana Surganova and Diana Arbenina established an acoustic duet "Nochnye Snaipery".

In 1998 Surganova and Arbenina released their first album "Капля дегтя в бочке меда", ("Drop of a tar in the ointment") which became popular on Russian radio stations such as "Европа Плюс", "Радио Балтика", "Модерн", "Ностальжи" and "Русский шансон".

In the end of 1998, women decided to change the style of the band from acoustic to electric. In 1999, 2 new members entered "Nochnye Snaipery". In the same year the band released their second album "Детский лепет" ("Baby talk"). The third album was "Рубеж" ("Frontier"). In autumn of 2002, Svetlana Surganova and Diana Arbenina released their last joint album "Цунами" ("Tsunami"). In December 2002 Surganova left the band.

== "Surganova i Orkestr" ==
After leaving "Nochnye Snaipery" in 2002, Svetlana Surganova left the band and started her own, "Surganova i Orkestr" ("Сурганова и оркестр"; "Surganova and orchestra").

In 2003, their first album "Neuzheli ne ja" (“Неужели не я”, “Isn’t it me”) was released and sold more than 100,000 copies.

In 2004, they were nominated for “the best live-band of the year” award and won the prestigious FUZZ magazine award for “Pesnya goda” (“Песня года”).

Songs from "Neuzheli ne ja", especially "Murakamii" (“Мураками”, “Murakami”) and "Bol’no" ("Больно", "In pain") topped the music charts for months. The band shot a music video "Korabli" ("Корабли", "Ships"), that rotated successfully on MTV and MUZ-TV (МУЗ-ТВ), and went on the first tour through the country.

After the first album, later albums included: “Zhivoj” ("Живой",”Alive”) in 2003, “Vozljublennaja Shopena” (“Возлюбленная Шопена”, “Chopin’s beloved”) in 2005, “Sol” (“Соль”, “Salt”) in 2007. Those repeated the success of the first one: almost all the songs became hits and topped the music charts . The magazine “Russian Reporter” included the album “Sol” into the top 10 of the best rock-albums of Russia. Surganova i Orkestr is one of the most actively touring bands of Russia, performing across the Far East, Western Europe and the United States.

Definition coined by Surganova for a music played by a group "Surganova i Orkestr" is "VIP-Punk-Decadence", which stands for: V – aesthetically pleasing scenic image of an elegant man who tends to think, the image of the artist, combining experience and unsophistication; P- energetic and sincere treatment, with swashbuckling charm and a high degree of self-irony; D – a sophisticated and intelligent, but at the same time accessible poetry, that affects the timeless themes and have their analog works of writers of the Silver Age and the poetics of French symbolism, and a Drive that forces public to "stand on their heads" and to barely held themselves in chairs.

== Personal life ==
Svetlana Surganova never concealed her homosexuality. In various interviews, Diana Arbenina (a second founder of Nochnye Snaipery), said that she was dating Surganova. The women were together for 9 years, but in 2002 they eventually broke up and Surganova left the band to create her own.

In 2008 she started advocating Side by Side (film festival) and became one of the judges.

In Interviews Svetlana Surganova mentions that she believes in God. According to her, there is one God, but different religions have different presentations of “God”.

In 1996 Surganova found out that she had sigmoid colon cancer. At the age of 27 she underwent a clinical death.

In May 2018 Surganova was banned from visiting Ukraine for three years due to violating Ukrainian law by entering Crimea through Russia in 2016, two years after the region was annexed by Russia. She supported the 2022 Russian invasion of Ukraine, and the Presidential Administration of Russia put her on the list of singers who were recommended to be invited to state-sponsored events.
