= Mahide Lein =

German LGBT activist

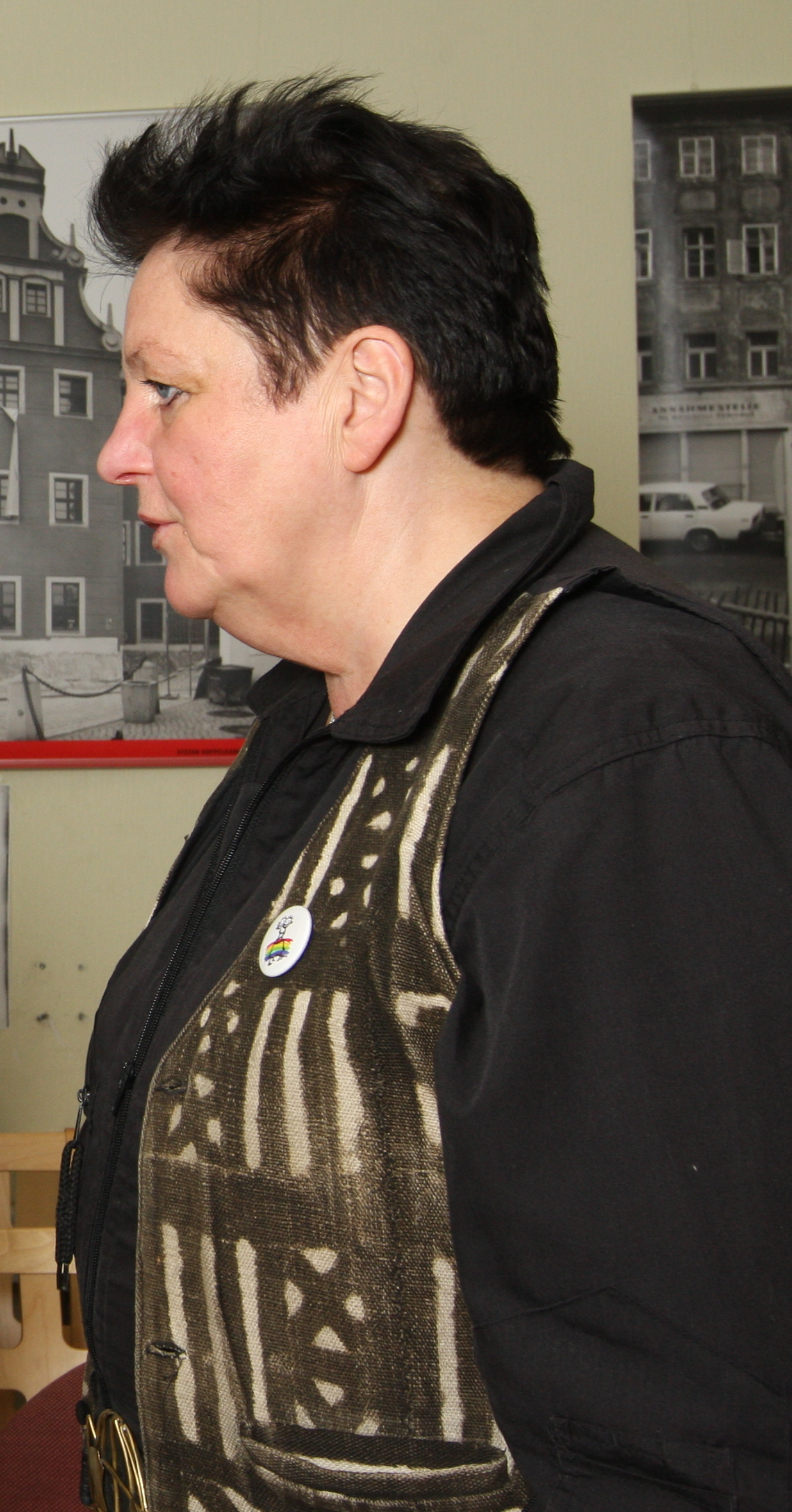
- At the 2009 Side by Side Festival
- Born: 1949 (age 76–77); Höchst, Germany
- Education: Goethe University Frankfurt
- Occupation: Activist

Mahide Lein (born 1949) is a German LGBTQ+ activist, organiser and head of a concert agency. She has also campaigned for sex workers' rights and with the anti-psychiatric movement.

== Biography ==
Lein was born in 1949 in Höchst, Frankfurt am Main, Hesse, Germany. Her mother was an accordionist and draftsman, and her father worked as a master goldsmith. She was raised as a Protestant. Lein studied political science and religion at Goethe University Frankfurt and apprenticed as an office clerk for two years after graduating.

Lein became involved with the New Women's Movement and ran the women's café Café Niedenau in a squatted house on Kettenhofweg in Frankfurt am Main from the 1970s. The café hosted exhibitions, political discussions and concerts. She was also one of the founders of the first lesbian centre in Frankfurt.

After moving to Berlin, Lein is credited with shaping Berlin's lesbian scene in the 1980s and 1990s. She was an organiser of the Berlin Christopher Street Day (CSD, Germany and Switzerland's counterpart to pride parades), the anti-psychiatric Irren-Offensive Tribunals, and the KultHur-Festival to promote sex workers' rights.

During the 1990s, Lein worked with gay men on a Russian-German cultural exchange. In May 1992, Lein, the German filmmaker and LGBTQ+ activist Andreas Strohfeldt and the Tschaikowsky Foundation in Saint Petersburg organised the first Russian CSD.

Lein launched the lesbian magazine television programme Läsbisch TV, with 27 one-hour episodes broadcast on the Berliner Kabel station from 1991 to 1993. She has also been interviewed for lesbian documentaries, commenting on "the problems of speaking openly about taboo desires in sexually less tolerant societies" and on queer aging for Vice magazine. She sat on the jury for the queer film prize TEDDY for two decades and spoke at the 2nd Side by Side LGBT Film Festival in 2009.

Lein is the founder and head the international concert agency AHOI Kultur.

== Awards ==
- CSD Berlin Civil Courage Prize at CSD 2004
- Rainbow Award given at Lesbian and Gay City Festival Berlin 2018

She was also honoured with an award for her 75th birthday by the Berlin Music Commission.
