= Igor Kon =

Soviet and Russian philosopher, psychologist and sexologist (1928–2011)

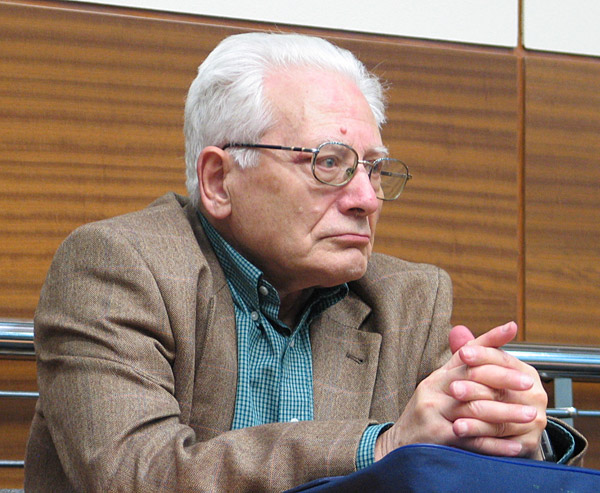
- Born: 21 May 1928; Leningrad, Russian SFSR, Soviet Union
- Died: 27 April 2011 (aged 82); Moscow, Russia
- Education: Herzen State Pedagogical University
- Known for: Pioneer of sexology in the Soviet Union
- Awards: Gold Medal of the World Association for Sexual Health (2005), Medal of the Order "For Merit to the Fatherland"
- Scientific career
- Fields: sexology, gender studies, sociology, psychology, philosophy

Igor Semyonovich Kon (Russian: Игорь Семёнович Кон; 21 May 1928 – 27 April 2011) was a Soviet and Russian philosopher, psychologist, and sexologist. His scientific publications have been translated into many languages, such as English, German, and French.

== Biography ==
Kon was born in Leningrad (now St. Petersburg). He was evacuated during the Siege of Leningrad and returned after the lifting of the blockade in 1944. He graduated from Herzen State Pedagogical University with a degree in history in 1947 and was awarded a candidate of sciences degree by the same university in 1950. He was awarded the doctor of sciences degree by Leningrad State University in 1959.

Kon worked at a variety of academic institutions between 1950 and 1974, holding positions at the Vologda Pedagogical Institute in 1950-52, the Leningrad Chemical-Pharmaceutical Institute (now St. Petersburg State Chemical-Pharmaceutical Academy) in 1953-56, Leningrad State University (now St. Petersburg State University) in 1956-67, the Institute of Philosophy of the Academy of Sciences of the USSR in 1967-68, the Institute of Concrete Social Research of the Academy of Sciences of the USSR (now Institute of Sociology of the Russian Academy of Sciences) in 1968-72, and the Institute of Social Sciences in 1972-74. He has been chief researcher of the Institute of Ethnology and Anthropology at the Russian Academy of Sciences since 1974.

Kon was one of the first Soviet scholars to write textbooks on sociology. He is most famous as an expert on sexology and sexual health. He started studying these matters in the middle of the 1960s. His Vvedeniye v seksologiyu (Introduction to Sexology; 1988, 2005) was written as a textbook for universities.

He believed that sexology cannot be confined to the bounds of medical problems, but rather is an independent interdisciplinary science rather than a branch of medicine. Interviewed by Sarah Keller for his profile in a 1989 issue of the American magazine Mother Jones, Kon stated:

Attitudes [toward sexual awareness] among American and Soviet right-wing people are very similar. [Opponents in the United States complain of] a dirty communist conspiracy to undermine the morals of sound youth. In our country, it is called a dirty industrialist conspiracy to undermine the morals of Soviet youth.

Kon was a member of numerous scientific societies, including the International Academy of Sex Research, the European Association of Experimental Social Psychology, the International Sociological Association, the Polish Academy of Sex Research, and the European Association for Adolescent Psychology. He was a member of the International Advisory Board of the German Society for Social-Scientific Sexuality Research.

== Death ==
Igor Kon died in Moscow, aged 82, in 2011, from cancer.

== Honors ==
Kon was awarded an honorary professorship from Cornell University in 1989 and received a doctor honoris causa degree from the University of Surrey in 1992.

In 2005, the World Association for Sexual Health awarded Kon its Gold Medal for outstanding contributions to sexology.

== Publications ==
- Kon, Igor & James Riordan (Eds.) (1993). Sex and Russian Society. Bloomington, Indiana: Indiana University Press; ISBN 978-0-253-33201-1.
- Kon, I. (1989) A History of Classical Sociology. Trans. H. Campbell Creighton. Moscow: Progress Publishers. ISBN 5-01-001102-6.
- Kon, I. (1995) Sexual Revolution in Russia: From the Age of the Czars to Today. Trans. James Riordan. New York: Free Press; ISBN 978-0-02-917541-5.
- Kon, I. S. and Guseinov, S. N. (editors). A dictionary of ethics. Moscow : Progress Publishers. 1990. 455 p.
- Kon, I. S. (editor). A history of classical sociology. Moscow : Progress Publishers. 1989. 376 p. Series title: Student's library. Translated by H. Campbell Creighton.
- Alexandrov, Vladimir. * Volkov, F. M., Gubsky, Ye. F., Afanasyev, V. G., Ibrahim, Taufic, Imam, Zafar, Kon, I. S., Krivoguz, I. M., Petrovsky, A. V., Popov, Yu. N., Reza, Munis, Romanovsky, N. V., Tumanov, V. A., Vereshchetin, V. S., Zdravomyslov, A. G., and Zotov, V. D. (editors). Essays in contemporary history : 1946 - 1990. Moscow : Progress Publishers. 1990. [371] p. Series title: Student's library. Translated by Lev Bobrov.
- Anderson, K. M., Bogina, Sh. A., Falkovich, S. M., Guseva, N. M., Islamov, T. M., Kovalskaya, M. I., Krivoguz, I. M., Lebedev, I. A., Losev, Yu. G., Mikhailov, M. I., Obolenskaya, S. V., Pavlova, T. A., Pritsker, D. P., Roginsky, V. V., Slezkin, L. Yu., Yurovskaya, Ye. Ye., and Zverev, A. M. * Yurovskaya, Ye., Volkov, F. M., Gubsky, Ye. F., Afanasyev, V. G., Ibrahim, Taufic, Imam, Zafar, Kon, I. S., Krivoguz, I. M., Petrovsky, A. V., Popov, Yu. N., Reza, Munis, Romanovsky, N. V., Tumanov, V. A., Vereshchetin, V. S., Zdravomyslov, A. G., and Zotov, V. D. (editors). Modern history : 1640 - 1870. Moscow : Progress Publishers. 1990. [351] p. Series title: Student's library. Translated by Barry Jones.
- Chuvilkin, O. D., Lomakin, V. K., Proshunin, N. N., and Vishnyakova, I. V. * Volkov, F. M., Gubsky, Ye. F., Afanasyev, V. G., Ibrahim, Taufic, Imam, Zafar, Kon, I. S., Krivoguz, I. M., Petrovsky, A. V., Popov, Yu. N., Reza, Munis, Romanovsky, N. V., Tumanov, V. A., Vereshchetin, V. S., Zdravomyslov, A. G., and Zotov, V. D. (editors). The political map of the world. Moscow : Progress Publishers. 1990. [244] p. Series title: Student's library. Translated by Patty Beriozkina.
- Getmanova, Alexandra. * Volkov, F. M., Gubsky, Ye. F., Afanasyev, V. G., Ibrahim, Taufic, Imam, Zafar, Kon, I. S., Krivoguz, I. M., Petrovsky, A. V., Popov, Yu. N., Reza, Munis, Romanovsky, N. V., Tumanov, V. A., Zdravomyslov, A. G., and Zotov, V. D. (editors). Logic. Moscow : Progress Publishers. 1989. [358] p. Series title: Student's library. Translated by Stephen Smith.
- Rakitov, Anatoly. * Volkov, F. M., Gubsky, Ye. F., Afanasyev, V. G., Kon, I. S., Krivoguz, I. M., Munis, Reza, Petrovsky, A. V., Popov, Yu. N., Romanovsky, N. V., Shuare, Marta, Taufik, Ibrahim, Tumanov, V. A., Zafar, Imam, Zdravomyslov, A. G., and Zotov, V. D. (editors). The principles of philosophy. Moscow : Progress Publishers. 1989. [366] p. Series title: Student's library. Translated by H. Campbell Creighton.
