= Nochnye Snaipery =

Russian rock group

Nochnye Snaipery Ночные Снайперы
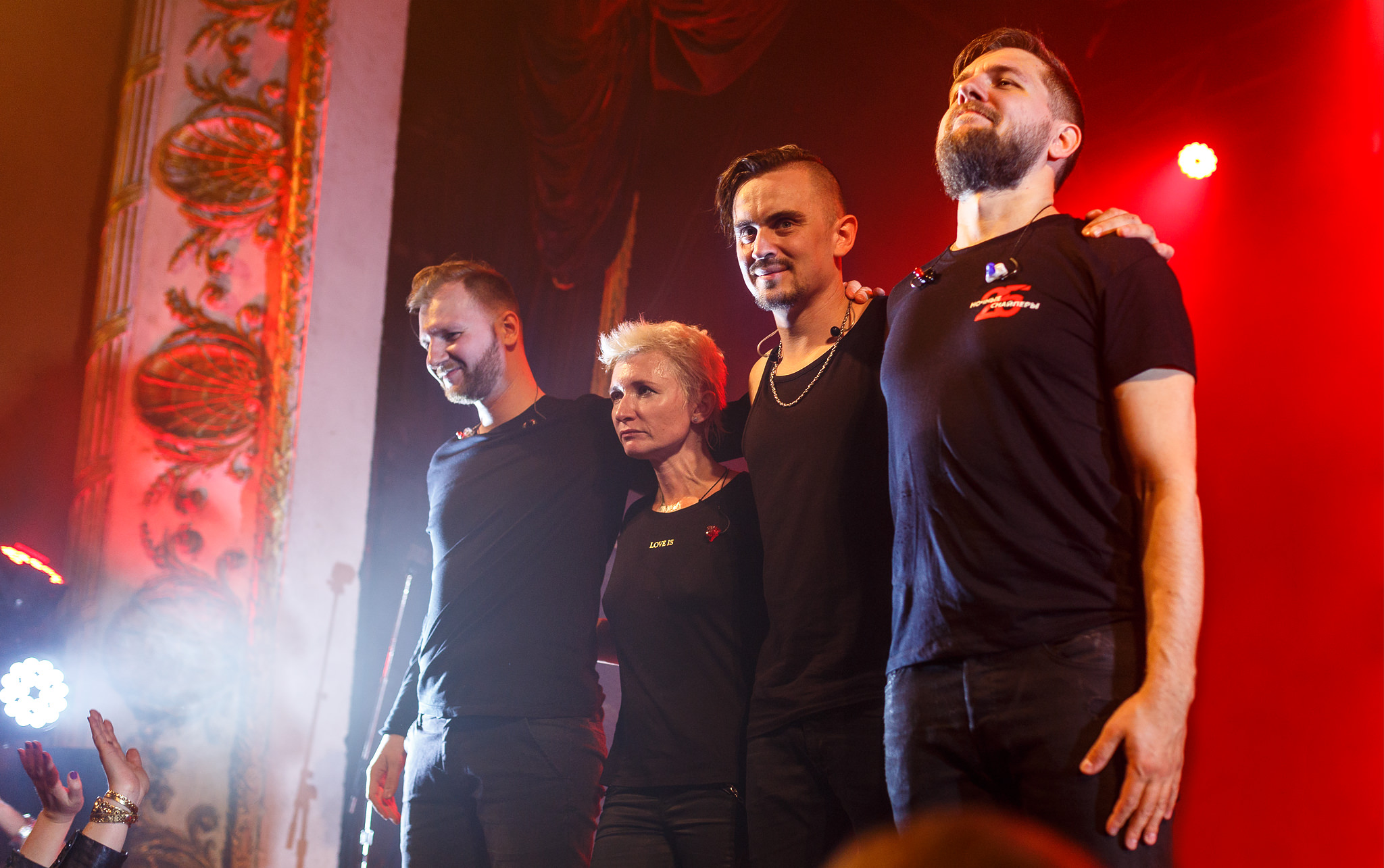
- Concert in Toronto (May 2018)

Background information
- Origin: Saint Petersburg, Russia
- Genres: Rock; pop rock; indie rock; bard rock
- Years active: 1993–present
- Labels: Real Records
- Members: Diana Arbenina; Sergei Makarov; Aleksandr Averyanov; Denis Zhdanov
- Past members: Svetlana Surganova; Ivan Ivolga; Andrei Titkov; Dmitri Maksimov; Dmitri Gorelov
- Website: snipers.net

Nochnye Snaipery (Russian: Ночные Снайперы, lit. 'Night Snipers') is a Russian rock group. It was founded in 1993 as an acoustic female duo of Diana Arbenina and Svetlana Surganova. Arbenina and Surganova played guitar and violin respectively, sharing the vocal and songwriting duties evenly, eventually adding amplification to the band. Since its inception, the band has participated in a variety of Russian musical festivals — from the underground (such as Babye Leto and Moguchaya Kuchka) to the major events (Nashestvie, Maxidrom, Krylya), as well as touring extensively domestically and abroad.

The band's best known singles are "Tridtsat Pervaya Vesna" ("31st Spring"), "Rubezh" ("Frontier"), "Stolitsa" ("Capital"), "Asfalt" ("Asphalt"), and "Aktrisa" ("Actress"). The majority of the songs in the band's repertoire is written by Arbenina and Surganova, but some use the poetry of such famous authors as Joseph Brodsky, Anna Akhmatova, and Federico García Lorca.

In 2002, Svetlana Surganova left the band to create her own group Surganova i Orkestr ("Surganova and Orchestra"), and Arbenina remained as Nochnye Snaipery's lead vocalist.

== Early history ==
The official date of Nochnye Snaipery's creation can be considered August 19, 1993 when Diana Arbenina and Svetlana Surganova met in Saint Petersburg. Soon afterwards, they performed as an acoustic duo at the Second All-Russian Bard Song Festival, after which Arbenina returned to her home city of Magadan, and the creative project was placed on hiatus.

In November 1993, Surganova moved to Magadan, and for the remainder of the academic year, the duo gave concerts at a local casino "Imperial" and at the Magadan University, where Arbenina was a student at the time. They also recorded a series of home concerts, given for the benefit of friends and relatives. These early recordings are quite sought out by the fans of the band. It is anecdotally accepted that the name "Nochnye Snaipery" was chosen after Arbenina and Surganova were walking to public transportation after a gig, carrying a guitar and a violin in their cases, and were accosted by a man wanting to know if they were walking "to hunt or from a hunt," thinking their instruments were shotguns.

In May 1994, Nochnye Snaipery won a regional round of the All-Russian Musical Competition "Student Spring" and traveled west to Samara for the finals, eventually moving back to St. Petersburg. While based there, the duo continued an active life of gigs, songwriting, underground performances, etc., building a loyal following. In 1996, Nochnye Snaipery took their first trip outside of Russia to attend a student festival in Denmark. Two books of their texts were published in the same year - Цель ("Goal") and Дрянь (Rotter) (called "anti-songs" by the authors.)

In February 1997, Arbenina and Surganova added amplification to the acoustic guitar and violin and collaborated with the drummers from the St. Petersburg band Soyuz Kommertcheskogo Avangarda ("The Union of Commercial Avant-Garde"), Yura Degtyaryov and Alexei Ivanov, as well as with the guitar soloist Denis Doulitsky from the band Vacuum'.

In June 1997, Nochnye Snaipery debuted on the Internet. Getting more notoriety, Arbenina and Surganova sought help from the bands Ulme and Kuzya-band in recording some of their songs, which later would make up the album Detskiy Lepet ("Child's Babble"), published in 1999.

After graduating from university, Arbenina and Surganova devoted all of their attention to professional music. In the summer of 1998, they used an auditorium at the St Petersburg Zoo to record their first official album Kaplya Diogtia/V Botchke Meda ("Drop of tar/In a barrel of honey"), which was sold on audio tapes. They also acquired a manager (Svetlana Loseva) who organized the band's participation at the Sirin festival of female vocalists held in Tyumen. Loseva also introduced Nochnye Snaipery to bassist Igor Kopylov and drummer Albert Potapkin, musicians from the iconic Russian rock group Nautilus Pompilius, who began to perform with the band. By early 1999, Nochnye Snaipery were in rotation on radio and television in St Petersburg, and in May 1999, they had their first performance in Moscow. Their first official website debuted that spring.

The sound of the early Nochnye Snaipery is quite unusual in its choice of violin (and sometimes flute) layered on the guitar riffs and rhythms, growing out of the acoustic traditions of Russian bards, and evoking some traditions of gypsy music, as well as some parallels with country music. The song content concerns mostly love and loss, and could be compared to early Ani DiFranco without the political overtones.

== Popularity ==
In 2000, Albert Potapkin left the group, to be replaced by Ivan Ivolga and Sergei Sandovsky. Nochnye Snaipery gave their first real international concerts in Germany and United States, where the group's popularity was assured by the large numbers of immigrant youth. After recording the album Rubezh ("Frontier"), their single "Tridtsatpervaya Vesna" ("31st Spring") entered rotation at one of the best known Russian radio stations, Nashe Radio, and by the fall of 2000, everyone in Russia had heard of the Nochnye Snaipery. By December 2000, the group was signed by Real Records.

The group spent 2001 touring around Russia and the Former Soviet Union. Dmitry Gorelov joined the band as the new drummer, and the album Zhivoi ("Alive") was recorded during a Christmas concert at "Barmalei" Club.

The recording for Tsunami began in Kyiv in 2002, and proved to be fatal to the duo. A couple of days after the official release of the album in December 2002, Svetlana Surganova left the group, to later start a solo career with Surganova i Orkestr. Other events of note in 2002 included two tours of Israel and two large acoustic concerts – in Moscow Art Theatre and St. Petersburg's Lensovet Theatre. Dmitry Chestnykh joined the group as the new bassist, and another book of Surganova/Arbenina poetry was published - Patrontash.

The Frontier/Tsunami period is much more grown up in its sound and structure. Political themes and questions about meaning of life make appearances in the lyrics; "Tridtsatpervaya Vesna" is to day possibly being the best known single of the group. The vocal structure is more dominated by Diana Arbenina, while in the early years the women sang about 50 percent of the repertoire in turn. The sound becomes harsher, more rock-oriented, with hard-driving drum lines and stylistic experiments.

== New Millennium ==
Surganova's departure called for a radical change in the musical style of the band – instead of replacing the string instruments with another musician, Nochnye Snaipery acquired a keyboardist (first Alexei Samarin, then Airat Sadykov). February 2003 saw the band give their largest yet concert at the famous Moscow sports arena Luzhniki. A new acoustic album Trigonometriya ("Trigonometry") was recorded during a concert at Moscow Art Theatre in May 2003. The band's 10th anniversary was celebrated with a large concert and a party at the B2 club.

In the summer of 2004, Nochnye Snaipery performed at the "Russian Rock Night" festival in Berlin, and soon thereafter released a new electric album SMS. However, they carried on the acoustic tradition during concerts in Moscow and St. Petersburg titled Superakustika ("Superacoustics").

In 2005, Diana Arbenina received a prestigious independent Russian award Triumph "for achievements in literature and the arts". In that same year Nochnye Snaipery collaborated with two very different musicians – Japanese pop musician Kazufumi Miyazawa and Russian rock group Bi-2. The collaboration with Miyazawa was titled Simauta and led to the band's participation in Fuji Rock Festival, making them the first Russian group to do so.

Another acoustic album, Trigonometriya 2, was released in 2005, after a recording of a May 2005 concert at the Moscow Art Theatre, and the Japanese version of the album Koshika was published. In the fall of 2005, Nochnye Snaipery traveled to Switzerland, kicking off a tradition of yearly tours outside of Russia. Arbenina also published another book of lyrics and anti-songs Katastroficheski.

In early 2006, the album Koshika was released in Russia, and the band toured the United States and Israel. Diana Arbenina performed in multiple memorial concerts as an acoustic solo musician, including Svoya Koleya ("Own Track"), commemorating Vladimir Vysotsky and In Memoriam Bulat Okudjava in Peredelkino. In early 2007, Nochnye Snaipery released the album Bonni i Klaid ("Bonnie & Clyde"), which includes some collaborative tracks with Bi-2 and draws inspiration from Western themes.

== Discography ==
- 1993 Pervaya Pulia, Первая пуля ("First Bullet") (not published)
- 1995 Vtoraya Pulia, Вторая пуля ("Second bullet") (unofficial)
- 1998 Kaplya Diogtia/V Botchke Meda, Капля дегтя/В бочке меда ("Drop of tar/In a barrel of honey") (Caravan Records)
- 1999
  - Britanets, Британец ("Briton")
  - Detskiy Lepet, Детский лепет ("Child's Babble") (Manchester Files)
  - Kanarskiy, Канарский ("Canarian") (not published)
- 2001 Rubezh, Рубеж ("Frontier") (Real Records)
- 2002
  - Zhivoi, Живой ("Alive") (Real Records)
  - Kaplya Diogtia/V Botchke Meda, Капля дегтя/В бочке меда ("Drop of tar/In a barrel of honey") (Real Records)
  - Tsunami, Цунами (Real Records)
- 2003 Trigonometriya, Тригонометрия ("Trigonometry") (Real Records)
- 2004 SMS, (Real Records)
- 2005
  - Simauta (together with Kazufumi Miyazawa)
  - Koshika (Japanese release, together with Kazufumi Miyazawa)
  - Trigonometriya 2, Тригонометрия 2 ("Trigonometry 2") (Real Records)
- 2006 Koshika (together with Kazufumi Miyazawa) (Russian release)
- 2007 Bonni i Klaid, Бонни & Клайд ("Bonnie & Clyde")
- 2008 Dezertir sna. Ja govorju, Дезертир сна. Я говорю (Deserter of Sleep. I'm Speaking.) (Audiobook with poems.)
  - Kanarckij, Канарский (Canarian)
- 2009 Zhivago v Luzhnikah, Живаго в Лужниках (Zhivago in Luzhniki)
  - Juzhnyj poljus, Южный полюс (South Pole) (single)
  - Armija 2009, Армия 2009 (Army 2009) (album)
  - Poslednij patron, Последний патрон (The Last Bullet) (Concert DVD)
- 2010 Кandagar, Кандагар (Kandahar) (Single)
- 2012 4 (album)
- 2016 Vijivut Tolko Vlublonie, Выживут только влюблённые (Only Lovers will Survive)
- 2019 Nevynosimaya leghost bytiya, Невыносимая лёгкость бытия (The Unbearable Lightness of Being)
