= Viktor Koklyushkin =

Soviet and Russian writer (1945–2021)

- Koklyushkin in 1997
- Born: 27 November 1945; Moscow, Russian SFSR, USSR
- Died: 11 November 2021 (aged 75)

Viktor Mikhailovich Koklyushkin (Russian: Ви́ктор Миха́йлович Коклю́шкин; 27 November 1945, Moscow – 11 November 2021) was a Soviet and Russian satirist and television host.

== Biography ==
Viktor Koklyushkin was born in 1945 in Moscow. He graduated from the Publishing and Printing College and the Higher theatrical courses GITIS. In 1969 he became the author of Koklyushkin page Literaturnaya Gazeta. Koklyushkin wrote monologues for such entertainers as Efim Shifrin, Yevgeny Petrosyan, Klara Novikova, Vladimir Vinokur, and Yelena Stepanenko. The author of 10 books of short stories, novellas and novels. Published in 1972 in Poland, Hungary, Czechoslovakia, Germany, Bulgaria. In 1987 he was awarded a literary prize by Yunost Magazine.

From 2012 to 2016, Koklyushkin was a columnist for Argumenty i Fakty.

== Personal life and Death ==
He was married twice.

- Daughter Elga Sepp (born 1 June 1972), is married to the famous TV presenter Vladimir Solovyov.
- Son Yan (1987)

He died on November 12, 2021, from acute heart failure.
