= Nikolai Zlobin =

Russian political scientist, journalist and historian

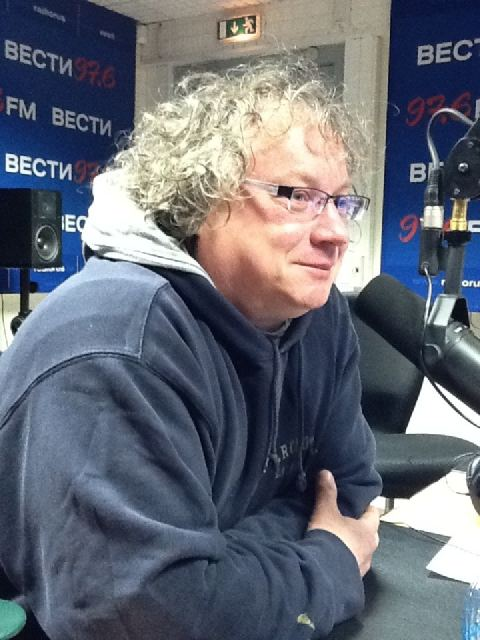
- Nikolai Zlobin in 2009
- Born: March 1, 1958; Moscow, USSR
- Education: Moscow State University (PhD)
- Occupations: Political scientist. President of the Center on Global Interests in Washington, D.C.
- Parent(s): Vasiliy Zlobin, Clara Zlobina

Nikolai Zlobin (Russian: Никола́й Васильевич Зло́бин; born 1 March 1958) is a Russian political scientist, journalist and historian who has spent more than 30 years living and working in the United States. He is the author of more than a dozen books and more than 300 essays and articles on topics of 20th century history, Russian and American politics, and international security. Following a lengthy career in academia, Zlobin emerged as a leading commentator on U.S.-Russian relations. He currently serves as founder and president of the Center on Global Interests in Washington, D.C.

== Early life ==
Nikolai Zlobin was born in Moscow on March 1, 1958, to a family of academics. His father was Vasiliy Ivanovich Zlobin (1919–2008), a World War II veteran and a distinguished professor of history at Moscow State University, where he taught from 1951 until 2008. Vasiliy authored a number of works on political history, World War II, and theory of political parties in Russia and the Soviet Union that were widely published in Russia and abroad. Zlobin's mother was Clara Konstantinovna Zlobina [née Bondarenko] (1928–2003), a nuclear physicist at the Academy of Sciences of the USSR (presently the Russian Academy of Sciences).

Zlobin grew up in the famous “instructors’ building" that housed Moscow State University professors, located at the intersection of Leninsky and Lomonosovsky prospects. He attended School No.14 (presently School No.26), the same school where his daughter would later enter first grade. By Zlobin's own account, he was a “hooligan” who did well on his schoolwork but consistently received poor grades for his behavior.

== Education ==
Zlobin completed his studies at Moscow State University. His undergraduate academic adviser was the social historian Vladimir Drobizhev (1931-1989). He received a BA degree there in 1977, a MA in 1979, followed by postgraduate studies in 1979–82 and 1990–93.

== Academic work ==
From 1983 to 1993, Zlobin was an assistant professor and later vice-head of the History Department at Moscow State University. He later served as an adviser to Russian president Boris Yeltsin.

Between 1995 and 1999 Zlobin was a visiting professor at Webster University, St. Louis. Between 1993 and 2000, Zlobin also held various short-term positions as a visiting professor and research fellow at a number of universities and research institutions in the United States, as well as the Kennan Institute of Advanced Russian Studies at the Woodrow Wilson International Center for Scholars in Washington, D.C.

At Webster University in St. Louis, Missouri Zlobin created the university's first international communications program. During this time he completed research for a book that would become the first non-American assessment of U.S. president Harry S. Truman, whom Zlobin largely credited with shaping the Cold-War world. In 2000, Zlobin published the first archival study on the preparation of Winston Churchill's 1946 "Iron Curtain" speech in Fulton, Missouri, which effectively announced the start of the Cold War.

Zlobin also produced the first works on Russian political humor during the Gorbachev era. His articles on the topic, such as “Humor as Political Protest” (1996), first appeared in the journal Demokratizatsiya, where Zlobin was co-editor.

=== Nonprofit work ===
From 2001 to 2012, Zlobin was Director of Russian and Asian programs at the Center for Defense Information (later renamed the World Security Institute) in Washington, D.C. During part of this time he produced Washington ProFile, a Russian-language news digest of American news and analysis that was widely read in Russia (see “Media” below).

In the fall of 2012, he founded and became President of the Center on Global Interests, a nonprofit research organization headquartered in Washington, D.C. While acknowledging the difficulties of opening a new think tank in an already saturated environment, Zlobin said his goal was to create an organization that would “go beyond Cold War thinking” to provide a strategic, long-term vision for U.S.-Russian relations.

=== Awards and honors ===
Zlobin was a permanent member of the Valdai Discussion Club from its inception in 2004 until his withdrawal after 2016. From 2008, he has been a permanent member of the Yaroslavl Global Policy Forum. He has also received two MacArthur Foundation awards, two awards from the Truman Institute, and another from the Soros Foundation.

== Media ==
=== 1990 - 2000 ===
After his arrival in the United States during the 1990s, Zlobin was a regular contributor to Literaturnaya Gazeta, at the time Russia's largest-circulation newspaper, and to Nezavisimaya Gazeta, a leader in the newly independent Russian press.

Zlobin was one of the first in the West to report on the growing influence of organized crime in Russia, which was initially thought to jeopardize his return to the country. After his article, "The Mafiacracy Takes Over," was published in The New York Times in 1994, Zlobin's father reportedly called and told his son, "I love you, but don't come back."

From 1993 to 2013, he served as an original executive co-editor of Demokratizatsiya: The Journal of Post-Soviet Democratization, an international scholarly journal focused on the contemporary transformation of the Soviet successor states. Initially launched at American University, it developed into an editorial project linking U.S. and Russian scholars and secured the support of the Helen Dwight Reid Educational Foundation, headed at the time by former Reagan adviser Jeane Kirkpatrick. It continues to be published today by George Washington University under Managing Editor Robert Orttung.

=== 2000 - present ===
From 2000 to 2004, Zlobin was founder and Editor-in-Chief of Washington ProFile, an independent digest of American news and analysis delivered to international readers on a minimal budget. Within several years of its existence Washington ProFile was distributed weekly to more than 20,000 Russian-language subscribers, and to a similar number of Chinese readers, in more than 100 countries .

In 2003 the digest was listed as the second-most cited American-based news agency in the Russian mass media after CNN. Its advisory board included the future U.S. Ambassador to Russia Michael McFaul, then an associate professor at Stanford University, who called the news outlet “the perfect kind of low-tech democracy assistance."

In the early 2000s, Zlobin became a columnist for the daily newspaper Izvestia, and from 2009 to 2012 he wrote a column for the Russian online journal Snob.ru. He also served on the Expert Board of the Russian news agency RIA Novosti from 2005 until its liquidation by the state in 2014. In 2008–2012, he was a permanent columnist for the newspapers Vedomosti and Rossiyskaya Gazeta, and frequently blogs for Echo of Moscow. His editorials have also appeared in the New York Times, International Herald Tribune, Washington Post, Financial Times, Los Angeles Times and the Chicago Tribune.

From 2008 to 2009 he hosted a weekly radio show on the Russian station Silver Rain. In 2010–2011, he was co-host of the weekly radio show “Direct Contact” [Rus: «Прямой контакт»] on Vesti-FM. He also appears as a frequent guest on BBC and on the Russian political talk-show “The Duel” [Rus: «Поединок»].

== Books and other publications ==
=== Early works ===
Zlobin co-authored the first non-communist high school history textbook used in Russia and other post-Soviet republics. After moving to the United States, he wrote the first study by a foreigner of U.S. President Harry S. Truman.

=== America—What a Life! ===
After writing a number of bestselling works on Russian and international politics, Zlobin developed a wide commercial following with the publication of a series of volumes on everyday life in the United States: America—What a Life! (2012), America: Bane of Heaven (2013) and Empire of Freedom: Values and Phobias of U.S. Society (2016). Written when the United States were being cast in a negative light by Russian state media, the books sought to acquaint ordinary Russians with the America beneath its “ideological blanket” by documenting the customs and daily features of life in the country, from American eating habits to the phenomenon of the teenage babysitter.

The first book was an immediate bestseller in Russia and was praised by The New York Times’ then-Moscow Bureau Chief Ellen Barry, who described the author as “suggesting, in his soft way, that Russian leaders would benefit from understanding what Americans are like.” In an atypical show of interest toward a foreign-language work, The New York Times also translated and published select excerpts from the book on its website. The book and its sequels have not yet been translated into English.

==== Selected books ====
- «Кто есть кто в команде Трампа?» (Who is Who in Trump's Team). Moscow: Eksmo, 2017.
- «Империя свободы: ценности и фобии американского общества» (Empire of Freedom: Values and Phobias of U.S. Society). Moscow: Eksmo, 2016.
- «Америка: исчадие рая» (America: Bane of Heaven). Moscow: Eksmo, 2013.
- «Америка: живут же люди!» (America—What a Life!). Moscow: Eksmo, 2012.
- «Противостояние. Россия. США» (Standoff: United States-Russia) (Foreword by Alexander Voloshin;Comments by Vladimir Solovyov). Moscow: Eksmo, 2009.
- «Второй новый миропорядок: Геополитические головоломки» (The Second New World Order: Geopolitical Puzzles). Moscow: Eksmo, 2009.

==== Co-authored books ====
- «Русский вираж: куда идет Россия?» (The Russian Turn: Where Is Russia Headed?). With Vladimir Solovyov. Moscow: Eksmo, 2014.
- «Путин—Медведев. Что дальше?» (Putin—Medvedev: What’s Next?). With Vladimir Solovyov. Moscow: Eksmo, 2010.
- «В кулуарах Вашингтона: умонастроения истеблишмента США в годы второго срока президента Джорджа Буша (2005-2008)» (In Washington’s Corridors of Power: The Mindset of the American Elite During George W. Bush’s Second Term, 2005-2008). With Lev Belousov. Moscow: Stepanenko, 2009.
- International Communication: A Media Literacy Approach, with Art Silverblatt. New York: M. E. Sharpe, 2004.

== Political stance ==
=== "Polar-less" world theory ===
In the early 2000s Zlobin proposed the theory of a so-called “polar-less” world, later outlined in The Second New World Order (2009), according to which the modern system of global politics is neither centered on two superpowers as it was during the Cold War, nor around multiple centers of power (a concept known as multipolarity). Instead, the "polar-less" world would have no dominant centers of power as states grew increasingly dependent on each other to address global challenges. The theory subsequently caught the attention of Russian Foreign Minister Sergei Lavrov, at the time Russia's ambassador to the United Nations, who called it a compelling new argument in international relations.

=== Disintegration of state sovereignty ===
Following the 2011 Libyan war, during which the UN Security Council approved a Western military intervention in Libya, Zlobin observed that the traditional concept of state sovereignty that emerged from the 1648 Peace of Westphalia was gradually becoming obsolete. Citing the growing number of military and humanitarian interventions carried out in foreign countries, Zlobin posited the end of Westphalian sovereignty, characterized by the principle of non-intervention, that had until then governed the international system. He has also promoted the creation of new principles of global security, replacing those with a regional approach with a new system of international institutions.

Zlobin has stated on numerous occasions that the process of the Soviet Union's collapse has not yet reached its conclusion and will continue to take place as new international borders are formed within the post-Soviet states. He has also said there is a danger that Russia may break apart into several states, and supports the elimination of internal national borders within the Russian Federation.

=== 2008 Russian-Georgian War ===
Following the 2008 Russian-Georgian war, Zlobin was one of the few American political experts to openly support the independence of Abkhazia. Rejecting the notion that Abkhazia was a Russian puppet state, Zlobin argued that Abkhazian independence instead coincided with Russian interests by hindering Georgia’s accession to NATO.

=== Corruption in Russia ===
Zlobin is a harsh critic of Russian policy despite being known to frequently interact with many of the country’s high-ranking officials. He has written widely about corruption within the country's political and business elite and has said that the absence of an effective judicial system is the main threat to Russian stability. In 2011, he described the Russian system as being run by “secretive and highly influential clans, without the consent of which no important economic or political decision in the country can be made or implemented.” Zlobin concluded that the return of clan politics to Russia was corrupting both the domestic system and the global institutions in which Russia took part.

=== Meetings with Russian leaders ===
Zlobin has interacted with Russia's leaders on numerous occasions, often within the framework of the Valdai Discussion Club. For example, in 2005, he was given a signed memo by Vladimir Putin stating that the latter wouldn't run for president in 2008 and would not change the constitution in order to allow himself to run for a consecutive third term. In 2008, Zlobin asked Putin how long the latter was planning to remain prime minister; Putin replied that he would remain in that post as long as “God wills."

In 2009, in response to Zlobin's question about whether he would compete with Dmitry Medvedev in the 2012 presidential elections, Putin announced that he and Medvedev would not run against each other but would rather “sit down and talk it over.” Medvedev confirmed these words shortly thereafter.

In the fall of 2011, Putin was asked by Zlobin why his political system was unsuccessful at generating young political leaders. Putin declared that the leaders were there, although he couldn't name anyone but Dmitry Medvedev as an example. During a Q&A with then-presidential candidate Vladimir Putin in February 2012, Zlobin raised the question of why Russia had no political allies in the world. Putin gave a vague reply that the fact that the 2014 Winter Olympics were voted to take place in Russia proved that Russia had “many allies."

=== Dmitry Medvedev's presidency ===
In 2012, Zlobin was one of the few experts to reach a positive assessment of Dmitry Medvedev's term as president (2008-2012), and was criticized by his colleagues around the world for this as a result. While pointing out Medvedev's failure to implement an ambitious domestic agenda, Zlobin argued that Medvedev pursued a more effective foreign policy than his predecessor by making Russia “an active participant in the creation of a new world order, instead of defending the old one,” as Putin had done.

== Personal life ==
Zlobin was a track and field athlete during his undergraduate years at Moscow State University. He passed the standard for Master of Sport of the USSR in the 100-meter race, the equivalent of a Nationally Ranked Player.

He has been married and divorced several times.
