= Center on Global Interests =

American research organization

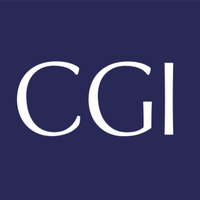
- Abbreviation: CGI
- Formation: 2012
- Type: Think tank
- Headquarters: 1050 Connecticut Avenue NW
- Location: Washington, D.C.
- President: Nikolai Zlobin
- Website: globalinterests.org

The Center on Global Interests (CGI) is an independent, nonprofit 501(c)(3) research organization headquartered in Washington, D.C. The Center conducts research and analysis on global affairs, focusing on Russia and the post-Soviet space. CGI was founded in 2012 by Nikolai Zlobin, a Russian-American foreign policy expert and author of multiple books on foreign affairs. It has often partnered with leading experts and officials from the United States and Russia, including security expert Pavel Baev, Ambassador Thomas Pickering, Ambassador Steven Pifer, and Russian Ambassador to the U.S. Sergey Kislyak. Several of the Center's events have been broadcast on C-SPAN.

== Leadership ==
Nikolai Zlobin, CGI's founder and president, is a Russian-American political expert, author and journalist who served as an adviser to Mikhail Gorbachev in the 1990s. While acknowledging the difficulties of opening a new think tank in an already saturated environment, Zlobin said his goal was to create an organization that would "go beyond Cold-War thinking" to provide a strategic, long-term vision for U.S.-Russian relations. The organization's board is chaired by Bruce Blair, an American nuclear analyst and scholar. Both were formerly with the World Security Institute (WSI). Blair, the recipient of a MacArthur "genius grant" for his work on nuclear nonproliferation, is also co-founder of Global Zero, an international initiative launched in December 2008 to promote the elimination of nuclear weapons.

== Activities ==
The Center on Global Interests focuses on long-term strategic analysis of the U.S.-Russia relationship and the system of global governance as a whole. Its program areas explore Russian domestic politics, the Russia-West relationship, and Russia's relations with major global powers (such as China) and within international organizations (such as the BRICS and the G20).

CGI distributes a daily news digest, the Daily Russia Brief, with news from Russia and Eurasia.

=== Publications ===
CGI recruits outside scholars and former government officials to produce its reports. In 2013, CGI met with top U.S. and Russian officials to produce a set of recommendations for the Russian presidency of the G20, focusing on Russia's responsibilities and opportunities as the host, as well as on the effectiveness of the G20 as a global institution. The resulting report was co-authored by Mark Medish, former Russia director at the National Security Council and president of Guggenheim International and Daniel Lucich, former Deputy Assistant Secretary of the Treasury. It was distributed to officials in Washington and Moscow.

Following Russia's expulsion from the G8 over its annexation of Crimea in March 2014, CGI published a report titled "Back to the G7: Russia's Expulsion from the Group of Eight and the End of the Post-Cold War World." In it, the author argued that Russia's failure to integrate into the G8 set the stage for its eventual departure, marking the end of the rapprochement between Russia and the West that had characterized the previous 25 years.

In March 2015 CGI published a report assessing Vladimir Putin's third term as president of Russia co-authored by three prominent experts: Richard Sakwa, Mark Galeotti and Harley Balzer of Georgetown University. Writing separately on the topics of politics, economics, and security, the authors concluded that Russia had entered a stage of "developed Putinism" in which the domestic system was solidified enough to sustain short-term crises but risked falling into long-term stagnation.

In advance of the July 2016 North Atlantic Treaty Organization (NATO) Summit in Warsaw, CGI published a report assessing the capabilities of the Russian military and its potential threat to Western countries. The authors of the report, Michael Kofman and Alexander Golts, argued that Russia's military reforms since the 2008 Russo-Georgian War had resulted in a significantly stronger army, but that it remained focused on conventional warfare (as opposed to "Hybrid warfare") and had still not completed its transition to becoming a high-readiness force.

=== Events ===
The Center organizes monthly panel discussions that are open to the general public. It has previously partnered with the Kennan Institute at the Woodrow Wilson International Center for Scholars and the George Washington University's Institute for European, Russian and Eurasian Studies (IERES) to host events.

Past events include:

- "Russia's Military: Assessment, Strategy, and Threat" with military analyst Michael Kofman.
- "Russia Policy for the Next U.S. Administration" with former Director of Russia Affairs at the United States National Security Council Thomas Graham (April 2016).
- "The U.S., Russia, and the New Middle East Disorder" held at the National Press Club (February 2016).
- "Iran Nuclear Deal: Stability or Threat?" moderated by James Fallows, Senior National Correspondent for The Atlantic.
- "Russia 2015: Economic Outlook" with Russia/Ukraine expert Anders Åslund and Russia's former Deputy Finance Minister Sergey Aleksashenko.
- "Russia and Its Northern Neighbors: Young Leaders on the Future of Baltic Security."
- "Working with Russia: Lessons and Best Practices for Times of Conflict" with Suzanne Massie, former Russia adviser to U.S. President Ronald Reagan.
- "Scripts of Sovereignty: The Freezing of the Russia-Ukraine Crisis and Problems of Governance in Eurasia" with Alexander Cooley, Director of the Harriman Institute at Columbia University.
- "Russia Today: Evaluating the Media Environment in 2015" with David Satter, the first Western journalist to be expelled from Russia since the end of the Cold War.
- "Turkey-Russia Conflict: What's Next?" with Kemal Kirisci of the Brookings Institution and Anya Schmemann of the Council on Foreign Relations.

CGI has hosted discussions with a number of prominent Russian figures and opposition leaders, including Ilya Ponomarev, the writer Dmitry Bykov, Ilya Yashin, and the Editor-in-Chief of the independent radio station Echo of Moscow, Alexei Venediktov. CGI also worked with the Embassy of Ukraine in Washington to host Mark Feygin, the Russian defense attorney who represented Pussy Riot and Ukrainian pilot Nadiya Savchenko.

=== Rising Experts Program ===
CGI's Rising Experts Program is a competitive year-long program that brings together advanced students and young professionals for meetings with established experts in Washington, D.C. to discuss topics concerning Eurasia, foreign policy, and global security.

== Mission and funding ==
CGI's mission statement is "to bring new, unconventional thinking on global affairs, fresh analysis on relations between modern world powers, particularly the United States and Russia, and critically evaluate current global challenges." According to its website, CGI does not accept government funding from the United States or abroad, and does not represent the interests of the Russian government or other Russian entities.
