= Vladimir Solovyov (TV presenter) =

Russian state media reporter (born 1963)

- Владимир Соловьёв
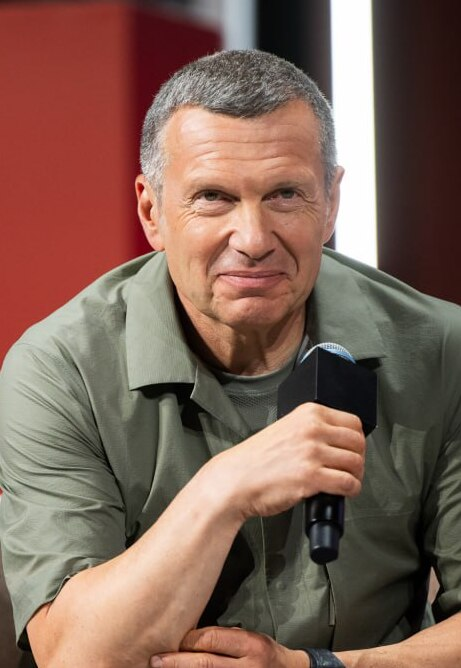
- Solovyov in 2025
- Born: 20 October 1963 (age 63); Moscow, Russian SFSR, Soviet Union
- Education: Candidate of Economic Sciences
- Alma mater: National University of Science and Technology MISiS
- Occupation: Television presenter
- Partner: Svetlana Abrosimova
- Awards: TEFI (2005, 2017); Order "For Merit to the Fatherland", 4th class (for great merits in shaping the image of Russia and active participation in socially significant events, 2022); Order of Honour; Order of the Badge of Honour (2013); Order of Friendship; Order of Alexander Nevsky (for “high professionalism and objectivity” in covering events in the Republic of Crimea, 2014); Hero of the Donetsk People's Republic

Vladimir Rudolfovich Solovyov (Note: Alternative spelling: Soloviev) (Russian: Владимир Рудольфович Соловьёв, born 20 October 1963) is a Russian TV presenter and propagandist. (Note: Attributed to multiple references:) He has been an anchor on the television show Evening with Vladimir Solovyov on Russia-1 since 2012. He is one of the most famous news anchors in Russia, though he has become controversial internationally for his staunch nationalism, signature ad hominem attacks against both domestic political and international rivals, and frequent threats against NATO members, which have increased significantly since the start of the Russo-Ukrainian war. (Note: Attributed to multiple references:)

In 1990, Solovyov left for the United States to teach economics. There he actively participated in political life and started doing business. Upon his return to Russia in 1992, he continued to run his business. In 1997 Solovyov became a presenter on the Silver Rain Radio. In 1999, he was invited to the ORT TV channel, where, together with Alexander Gordon, he began to host the program "Process". At the same time he hosted the program "Passion for Solovyov" on TNT channel. From 2001 to 2003 Solovyov hosted the programs "Breakfast with Solovyov", "Night of Nightingale", "Duel" and "Look Who's Here!" on TV-6 and TVS.

In June 2003, Solovyov was hired by NTV, where he hosted the talk shows "Orange Juice", "To the Barrier!", and "Sunday Evening with Vladimir Solovyov". Since 2004 Solovyov has published a number of books of artistic and journalistic nature, as well as recorded two music albums. He became a famous interviewer, and in 2005 he received the TEFI award in the relevant category. In the summer of 2010 Solovyov left Silver Rain Radio and moved to Vesti FM radio and Russia-1 TV channel, where he began hosting the talk show "Poyedinok".

Revealed by Anonymous International on 9 November 2015, Solovyov, Gazprom, Lukoil, Sergey Naryshkin, Igor Rudensky, Dmitri Pershin, Tikhon Shevkunov, and Alexei Kudrin are well connected through the government public relations specialist Alexey Ulyanov.

In March 2022, YouTube blocked his channel Solovyov Live. Since then, he was assigned the TV channel frequency of the news channel Euronews, which Russia banned after the invasion of Ukraine. Since the start of the war, Solovyov has repeatedly pushed disinformation and conspiracy theories denigrating Ukraine and justifying the invasion and subsequent Russian war crimes. (Note: Attributed to multiple references:) On air, he frequently calls for Ukraine and all of its allies to be destroyed. Due to this, he has been sanctioned by the European Union and United Kingdom.

== Early life and education ==
Vladimir Rudolfovich Solovyov was born on 20 October 1963, in Moscow, Russian SFSR, USSR, to an Ashkenazi Jewish family. His father, Rudolf Naumovich Solovyov, was a teacher of political economy and a boxing champion of Moscow. His mother, Inna Solomonovna Solovyova, worked as an art critic at the Battle of Borodino Museum.

Solovyov's parents met when they were students of the Moscow Pedagogical Institute. They separated when Vladimir was four years old, but continued to maintain friendly relations. Solovyov's maternal grandfather, Solomon Lvovich Shapiro, was a participant in the Great Patriotic War (Russian term for the Eastern front of WWII) head of the flight test station (LIS), and a lieutenant colonel. His paternal grandfather, Naum Semyonovich Vinitskovsky, was also a participant in the Great Patriotic War and a holder of the Order of the Red Star.

Solovyov attended school No. 72 in Moscow for his first year of education. From the second grade onward, he studied at the elite special school No.. 27 with the study of a number of subjects in English, where the children and grandchildren of members of the Soviet Central Committee of the CPSU, diplomats, and other notable figures studied. This school is now known as secondary school No.. 1232 with in-depth study of the English language. At the age of 14, Solovyov was admitted to the Komsomol, the Communist Union of Youth.

In the ninth grade, Solovyov became interested in karate. Prior to that, he played football and trained at the Moscow Youth Football School. However, due to the need to practice karate at the same time, he was forced to give up football.

After finishing school, Vladimir Solovyov enrolled at the Moscow Institute of Steel and Alloys in 1980. He graduated with honors in 1986, after completing the Faculty of Physics and Chemistry. During his time at the institute, he studied alongside Vladislav Surkov and Mikhail Fridman, both of whom Solovyov had known since 1981.

After completing his degree, Solovyov worked as an expert in the Committee of Youth Organizations of the USSR from 1986 to 1988. During this time, he pursued writing in his spare time.

Between 1988 and 1990, Solovyov taught physics and maths in Moscow School No. 27. The language of his lessons was English, a common practice in Russian language-specialized schools.

Following his work in the Committee of Youth Organizations, Solovyov continued his education by enrolling in postgraduate studies at the Institute of World Economy and International Relations of the USSR Academy of Sciences. He completed his studies at the institute and, in 1990, defended his dissertation for the degree of Candidate of Economic Sciences. The dissertation was titled "The main trends in the production of new materials and the factors of efficiency of their use in the industry of the USA and Japan". His degree was awarded in the speciality of "the economy of the capitalist countries."

== Career ==
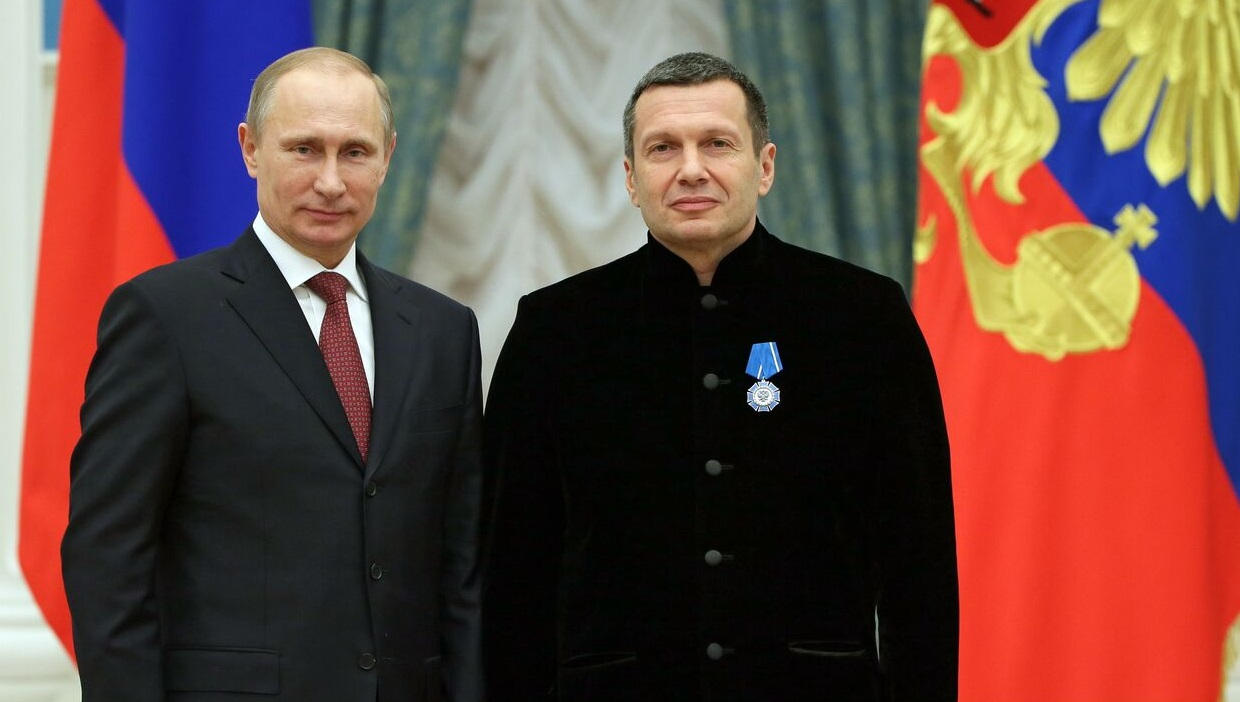
Solovyov receiving the Order of Honour from Vladimir Putin, 2013

In the early 1990s, Solovyov taught economics at the University of Alabama in Huntsville, worked as a business consultant in the USA and was a vice president of the company that produced disco and parties equipment.

In 1999, Solovyov first appeared as a presenter on two TV talk shows: The Process on the ORT channel (with Alexander Gordon) (1999–2001) and Passion for Solovyov on the TNT channel (1999–2002). These were followed by his own projects Breakfast with Solovyov and Nightingale Night on TV6, the latter being the final show broadcast on the station before it was shut down in early 2002, as well as Look Who's Coming!, Duel on TVS and Orange Juice on NTV.

However, his main occupation from 1998 to 2010 was Nightingale Warbles, a morning show on Silver Rain Radio. Until late 2000s, Solovyov expressed opposition to Putin's course, but he endorsed his successor Dmitry Medvedev in 2008 and supported the Russian authorities ever since.

On New Year's Eve in 2013, the Ukrainian comedian Volodymyr Zelenskyy, future president of Ukraine, and the Russian comedian Maxim Galkin, who later spoke out against the invasion of Ukraine and fled Russia in 2022, performed together in a traditional New Year's program called Little Blue Light on the Russia-1 TV channel. Solovyov also appeared on the show as one of the presenters and danced in the audience during Zelenskyy's performance.

Since September 2018 Solovyov has hosted the Moscow. Kremlin. Putin. show on the channel Russia-1, in which for one hour he talks about the deeds done by the president over the past week. The intonation of the program, the selection of guests – in the premiere, they turned out to be only individuals connected with state power: the president's press secretary Dmitry Peskov and the State Duma deputy from United Russia Andrei Makarov - the co-host (VGTRK) journalist Pavel Zarubin, has prompted a number of media outlets to consider the show to be an attempt to raise the rating of Putin.

=== 2022 Russian invasion of Ukraine ===
On 23 February 2022, one day before the commencement of Russia's full-scale invasion of Ukraine, Solovyov was sanctioned by the European Union and has been barred from entering the EU countries so long as the sanctions remain in force. All his EU domiciled assets have been frozen.

In the lead-up to the 2022 Russian invasion of Ukraine, Solovyov claimed that Russia has "enough firepower for the full annihilation of the Ukrainian military infrastructure without an incursion of forces into Ukrainian territory. But we aren't preparing to do this." He later voiced support for the invasion, saying that "Today is the day that a righteous operation was launched for the de-Nazification in Ukraine."

On 27 February 2022, Solovyov said he had been placed on a list of international sanctions after Russia's invasion of Ukraine and that his ownership of real estate at Lake Como was at risk. Later, on 5 March 2022, The Guardian wrote that the Financial Guard of Italy seized his villa, along with billionaire Alisher Usmanov's property. On 6 April 2022, his villa on the shores of Lake Como caught fire and was severely damaged, in what was probably an intentional fire.

In March 2022, Solovyov warned: "if you think we're going to stop with Ukraine, think 300 times, I will remind you that Ukraine is merely an intermediate stage in the provision of the safety of the Russian Federation." He accused Western-backed Ukrainian "Banderites" of attempting to assassinate him because he is a "Jewish anti-fascist."

As of March 2022, YouTube had blocked his channel Solovyov Live according to its three strikes policy. He then was assigned the TV frequency of the news channel Euronews, which was banned in Russia after the invasion of Ukraine.

On 20 April 2022, Solovyov talked on Russian state TV about a new stage of the war that started as part of the "special operation" against Ukraine. He said this new stage of war would be against "NATO's war machine and all its citizens", asserting that Russia "will show no mercy".

On 26 April 2022, while discussing the possibility of World War III and nuclear war with Solovyov on Evening with Vladimir Solovyov, RT editor-in-chief Margarita Simonyan said, "Personally, I think that the most realistic way is the way of World War III, based on knowing us and our leader, Vladimir Vladimirovich Putin knowing how everything works around here, it's impossible—there is no chance—that we will give up…We're all going to die someday." Solovyov added, "But we will go to heaven, while they will simply croak."

Igor Albin, former Vice Governor of Saint Petersburg, wrote on his Telegram channel: "Crazy 'propagandists' will burn in hell. You don't scold your own in times of war, but you shouldn't be proud of them either. There will be no winners in a nuclear war!" In June 2022, Solovyov warned that the US–UK military shipments to Ukraine were seen by the Kremlin as an escalation of the conflict, saying that "I hope we'll live through this. If everything keeps progressing the way that it is, only a couple of mutants in Lake Baikal will survive; the rest will be destroyed in a massive nuclear strike."

On 13 May 2022, he complained that Russian troops were being sent to Ukraine with "hopelessly obsolete weapons." On 18 August 2022, he suggested attacking Berlin, Paris, London and Brussels using missiles.

On 5 October 2022, he said that some high-ranking Russian commanders should be shot by firing squad. The clip with fabricated satirical subtitles has been circulating online purporting to show Solovyov complaining about being drafted into the Russian army as part of Putin's partial mobilization.

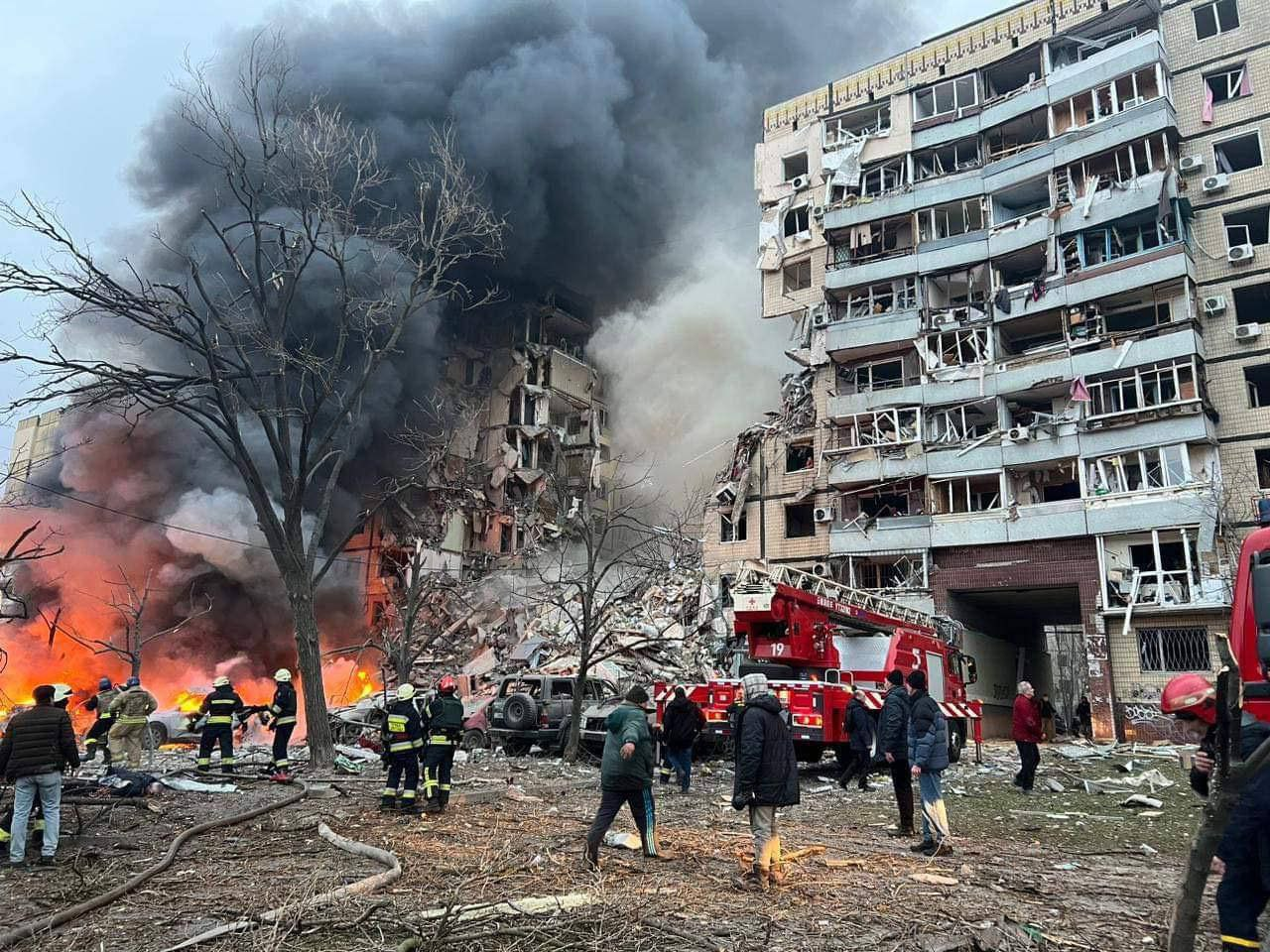
Residential building in Dnipro, Ukraine, after Russian missile strike on 14 January 2023. Solovyov called for retaliatory strikes on Ukrainian cities.

On 8 October 2022, a fire broke out on the Crimean Bridge as a result of an explosion on the road part of the bridge. Solovyov urged retaliatory strikes across all Ukraine targeting "bridges, dams, railways, thermal power plants and other infrastructure facilities". He also called on Putin to reinstate Stalin's Soviet-era counter-intelligence agency SMERSH – whose motto was "Death to Spies" – to suppress any internal opposition to the war in Ukraine.

Towards the end of November 2022, Solovyov suggested that Russia should attack Norway, since the General Secretary of NATO, Jens Stoltenberg, is a Norwegian. This was not taken very seriously in Norway.

Solovyov has repeatedly called for Russia to escalate the war with nuclear strikes. In January 2023, he said that "life is highly overrated" and urged Russians not to fear death, saying "Why be afraid of what is inevitable? We'll go to heaven."

Solovyov criticized Israel's actions in the Gaza Strip during the Gaza war, saying "I hope the West will shut up with those statements about the brutality of the Russian army. You want brutality? Look at how the Israeli army is fighting." He warned of the coming "global jihad" against the West and called for Russia's alliance with the Muslim world.

On 30 January 2024, Solovyov warned Boris Nadezhdin, the only anti-war candidate in the 2024 Russian presidential election, saying "I feel bad for Boris. The fool didn't realize that he's not being set up to run for president but for a criminal case on charges of betraying the Motherland."

== Conflicts, 2006–2022 ==
In October 2006, Solovyov moderated a televised debate between the candidates for the post of the head of the Samara city district, Viktor Tarkhov and Georgy Limansky. As Solovyov insulted Tarkhov during and after the broadcast, Tarkhov filed a lawsuit against him for 10 million rubles. After a year and a half, the court partially satisfied the claim, collecting 70 thousand rubles from the defendant.

In February 2014, Solovyov announced on air of the Full Contact program, that "under the auspices of" the Faculty of Applied Political Science at the Higher School of Economics, "organized terrorist groups" were operating, who prepared the "Maidan underground". The university reacted negatively to both Solovyov's statements and students' remarks, and attempts to link the institution with the political position of the participants in the scandal were regarded as a provocation.

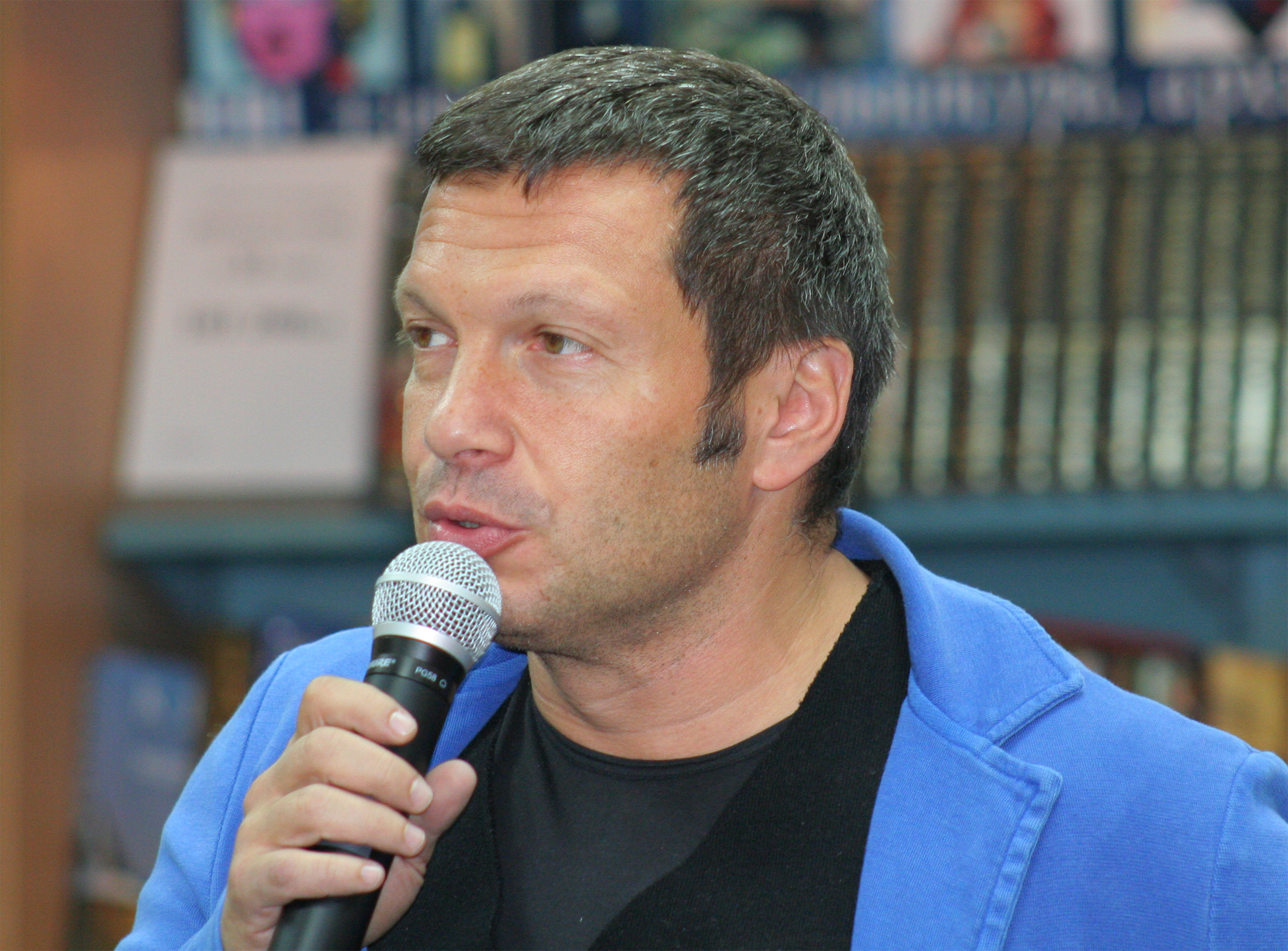
Solovyov in 2010

In June 2014, businessman Sergei Polonsky appealed to the Savelovsky court of Moscow with a claim for the protection of honour and compensation for moral damage in the amount of 200 million rubles against the "Vesti FM" radio station and Solovyov because of his broadcast in November 2013. Polonsky lost the lawsuit.

In August 2014, the National Council for Television and Radio Broadcasting of Ukraine included Solovyov in the sanctions list for his position on the annexation of Crimea by the Russian Federation and the Russo-Ukrainian War.

In June 2016, he intervened in the election campaign, harshly criticizing the KVN actress Yulia Mikhalkova-Matyukhina, who took the "passing place" in the primaries of United Russia in the Sverdlovsk region, who built her campaign under the slogan "I can take care of myself, I can also take care of the country". After that Mikhalkova-Matyukhina withdrew her candidacy.

In September 2017, during the broadcast of Channel One's program Evening Urgant, presenter Ivan Urgant said in response to the remark of former MTV Russia presenter Irena Ponaroshku about the face mask from the nightingale droppings brought to her studio: "First of all, this is a good name for a show on the "Russia" channel..." (The surname "Solovyev" is derived from "solovey", a Russian word for "nightingale".).

The episode of the show did not go unnoticed by Solovyov: a few days after this TV broadcast, in his live program for the Far East, he made the following speech: "I know a great way to avoid getting into the Myrotvorets. It's enough to make a nasty joke about me on your channel". When broadcasting the release of Solovyov's program to Moscow, this comment was cut out at the request of the presenter himself. Later, in an interview with Komsomolskaya Pravda, Solovyov regarded the passage of Urgant as a "declaration of war".

In November 2018, a picket was held in St. Petersburg against Vladimir Solovyov. The police detained seven people, six of whom were soon released. A protocol was drawn up against one of the participants in the picket, Pavel Ivankin, under an administrative article on disobeying the lawful demand of a police officer. The picket participants compared Solovyov particularly with Julius Streicher, one of the main propagandists of Nazi Germany, editor-in-chief of the newspaper Der Stürmer.

In May 2019, during the protests in Yekaterinburg against the construction of the Cathedral of St. Catherine in the park near the Drama Theatre, Vladimir Solovyov called the protesting people "demons" and "devils", and promised to visit the city to purge them. In response to Solovyov, the protesters began to sue him, and he was even challenged to a duel.

In April 2020, sports journalist Vasily Utkin criticized the Russian government's handling of the COVID-19 pandemic on television. Solovyov responded by calling Utkin "fat" and a mentally ill person. This led to an exchange of insults between the two, during which Solovyov threatened Utkin with physical violence.

In August 2022, Solovyov began to criticise the singer Alla Pugacheva for leaving Russia temporarily and accused her of lacking patriotism. In September, he further accused her of making money out of supporting "various political candidates" during election campaigns and not paying taxes on these incomes. Pugacheva responded by warning Solovyov on social media that he could "burst from anger and rudeness" and stating that she was going to "fill the face of one person," although she did not specify whom. On 7 September, Solovyov appeared on the air with abrasions on his face and refused to comment on the reason for his injuries.

== Controversies and criticism ==
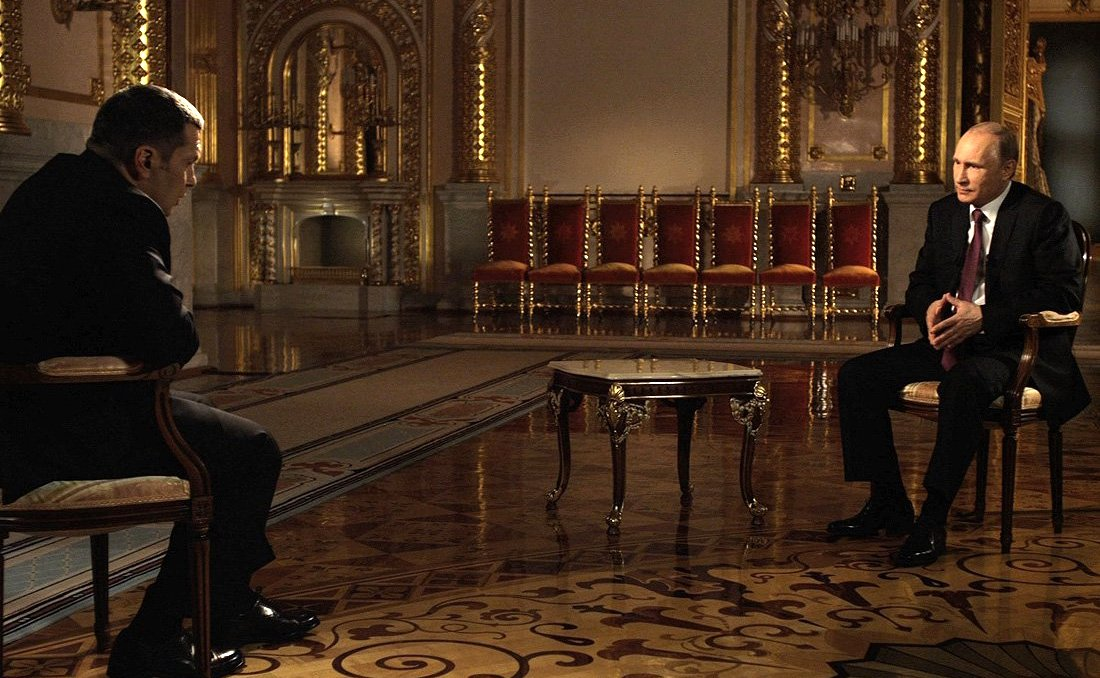
An interview with President of Russia Vladimir Putin. Documentary film President, 2015.

Numerous media organisations have described Solovyov as a propagandist. Solovyov regularly talks about his patriotism, and his claims about the development of Russia under Putin and the decline of the West. On 21 November 2007, at a pre-election rally forum in Luzhniki, Solovyov spoke in support of Putin and described him as a "strong, intelligent, talented leader" who loves the Motherland and does everything to make Russians proud of their country.

In 2011, Solovyov made comments on the Vesti FM radio station comparing the Armenian-Azerbaijani conflict to the Holocaust. The religious community of the Mountain Jews of Azerbaijan sent a note of protest to the leadership of the Vesti FM radio station and the Russian Jewish Congress, criticizing Solovyov's behavior and claiming that his remarks were offensive to the Azerbaijani people.

At the end of February 2014, together with a number of other pro-Putin journalists, public and political figures Solovyov signed an appeal for the "All of us are Berkut" foundation, which was created mainly to support the members of the Ukrainian special unit "Berkut" which was involved in violence and shootings against Ukrainian protesters during the Orange Revolution and Euromaidan.

Since the Russo-Ukrainian War began in 2014, Solovyov's position has mirrored that of president Putin and the Russian government: that the conflict was between the fascists of the Ukrainian maidan and the anti-fascists of the rebel-held eastern territories.

Solovyov has changed his opinion on different questions numerous times; for example, the Crimean problem. Solovyov on Crimea:

Any person who tries to start a war between Russia and Ukraine is a criminal, moreover, I can't even imagine the extent of such criminality. In Ukraine live people fraternal to us in spirit, in blood, in common history. Do not shout "Sevastopol is ours!" Do not shout "Crimea is ours!"

— (2008)

And why do you need Crimea?... It was, without a doubt, legitimately transferred (to Ukraine) by Kruschev. If we suddenly say (we're taking it back) – it means war. Do you want a war with Ukraine? How many Ukrainian and Russian lives are you ready to lay down in order to take Crimea, which (by the way) has long become a Tatar territory?... Crimeans are against (rejoining Russia).

— (2013)

We were bringing this day as close as we could. Crimea and Sevastopol are again a part of Russia. Historical justice has triumphed!

— (18 March 2014)

In June 2017, Solovyov called participants in an anti-corruption in Russia rally in Moscow "the eternal two per cent of shit", "children of corrupt officials" and "majoritarian imbeciles", and he also stated that "if not for the police, the (counter-protest) people would have torn them to shreds". The statement was criticized by journalist Alexander Nevzorov. Solovyov continued to use similar remarks against some audience members and Russian opposition journalists.

In February 2020, Anti-Corruption Foundation (FBK) lawyer Alexander Golovach turned to the Investigative Committee with a request to check Solovyov's documentary Mussolini. Sunset on the subject of violation of the law "On counteraction to the rehabilitation of Nazism" and other normative legal acts.

In May 2020, a petition on change.org started collecting signatures for banning Solovyov from entering Italy and the rest of the EU. The petition was addressed to the Italian Interior Minister, Luciana Lamorgese, and received the support of more than 200,000 people. Solovyov refused to comment on the appearance of this initiative.

In February 2021, Solovyov was banned from the Clubhouse social networking app. Likewise in Latvia, Solovyov was included on the list of personae non gratae after he compared jailed opposition leader Alexei Navalny with Adolf Hitler, saying that "unlike this codpiece Führer [Navalny]", he [Hitler] was a "very brave man" and did not attempt to dodge the army service." Alla Gerber, president of the Russian Research and Educational Holocaust Centre, said:

He's crazy and dangerous. Such people are unpredictable, they can say, do, hit, humiliate anything they want. It took a very long time to think, for years, probably, in order to come to such a lofty discovery – to compare the opposition figure, a man who is fighting for democracy, with Hitler. You have to be a madman and a very bad person. To call Hitler a brave man – we must boldly call Solovyov a scoundrel. Once, when Solovyov was more or less like a man, he came up to me and said: "Allochka, but you know, I am a Jew". I told him that he is a disgrace to our nation. Now I repeat this: he is not only a disgrace to my nation, he is a disgrace to all our people, to any decent community. I'm just in a fury.

On 21 February 2024, famed Russian milblogger Andrey Morozov (aka Murz) committed suicide shortly after he posted that Solovyov bullied him into deleting an earlier post on telegram that reported Russian forces lost over 16,000 men and 300 vehicles in the Battle of Avdiivka. In his suicide letter Morozov stated he did so due to harassment from his commanding officers, who were “political prostitutes led by Vladimir Solovyov.”

In April 2026, he insulted Italian Prime Minister Giorgia Meloni during an episode of his show Polnyj Kontakt (Full Contact). He mocked her name as "Putta-Meloni" ("Whore-Meloni" in Italian), and called her a "disgrace to the human race", a "wild beast", a "certified idiot", and a "nasty little woman". He also stated that she betrayed her electors and US President Donald Trump. This prompted Italy to summon the Russian ambassador.

=== Allegations of propaganda ===
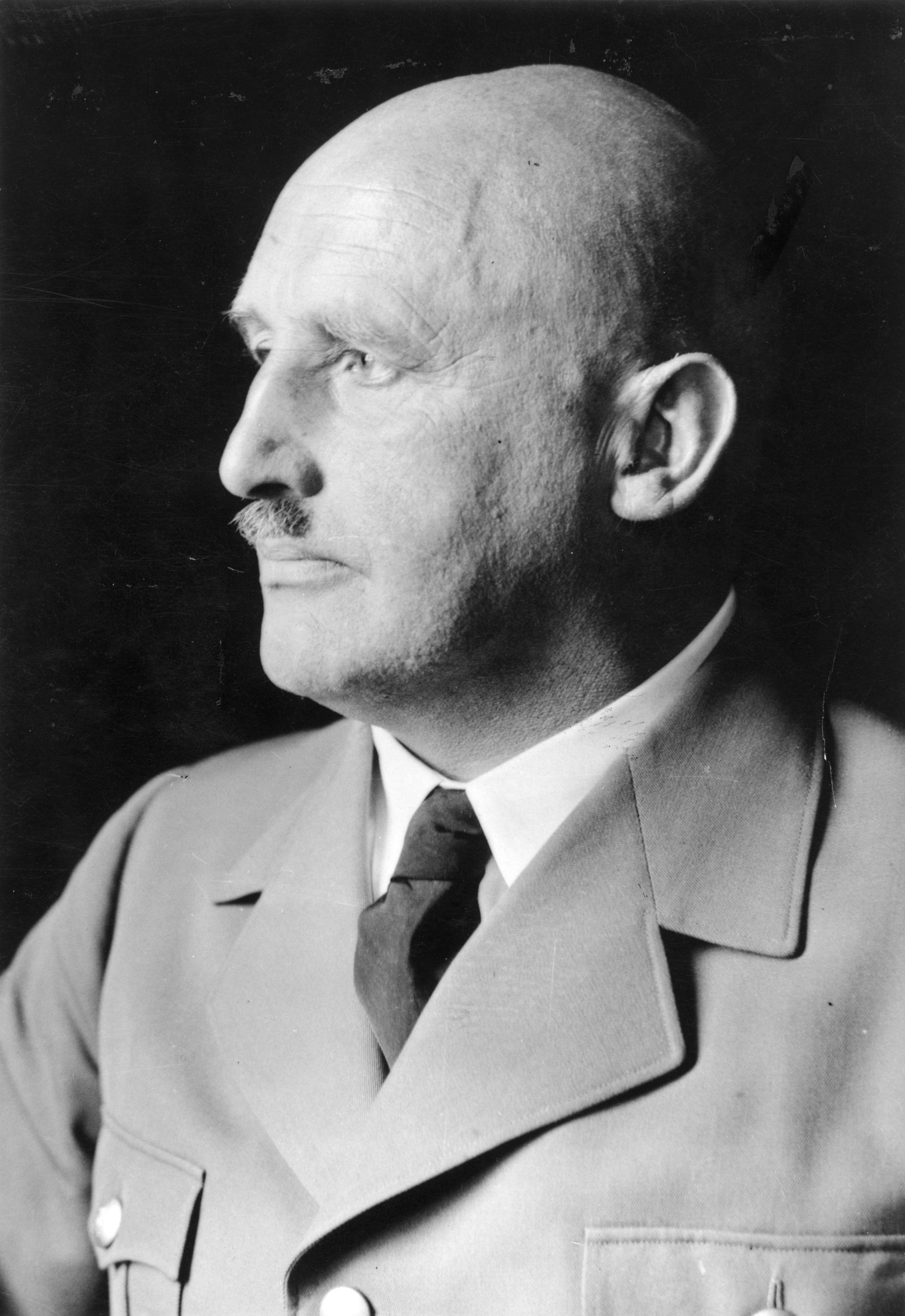
Solovyov was compared to Nazi propagandist Julius Streicher.

Vladimir Solovyov has been referred to by some as a propagandist and accused of spreading disinformation. The Russian state media describes him as a TV presenter, while the Ukrainian media refers to him as a propagandist. Some independent Russian media outlets describe him as a propagandist, and he was called a propagandist by 2018 Russian presidential candidate Ksenia Sobchak during a live pre-election debate. The U.S. State Department has called him "the most energetic Kremlin propagandist."

Solovyov has been criticised for his methods of work, which include the use of hate speech, hysteria, shouting, getting personal, direct insults, and humiliation. He has also been accused of spreading disinformation on his TV show Evening with Vladimir Solovyov, his radio program Full Contact, and on social networks. Some of the disinformation theses highlighted by the U.S. State Department from January to March 2022, circulated by Solovyov, include claims that:

- On 26 January 2022, Solovyov said that the U.S. is trying to push Ukraine into war with Russia to destroy the European economy and make it dependent on American liquefied natural gas.
- On 29 January 2022, Solovyov claimed that President of Ukraine, Volodymyr Zelenskyy, is mentally ill and that Kyiv is planning a massive terrorist attack in the Donbas.
- On 30 January 2022, Solovyov alleged that Britain, Poland, and Ukraine were planning to attack Russia.
- On 31 January 2022, Solovyov claimed that Anglo-Saxons dream of a war between Russia and Ukraine.
- On 2 February 2022, Solovyov said that the U.S. was planning to impose sanctions on Russian children and wreak havoc in Europe.
- On 6 March 2022, Solovyov alleged that Ukrainians staged fake Russian attacks.
- On 12 March 2022, Solovyov claimed that the Pentagon was developing biological weapons in Ukraine.
- On 16 March 2022, Solovyov claimed that Ukrainians were killing their own civilians to frame Russia, while Russia only targets military facilities.

Solovyov has also spread narratives that the British were responsible for the mass killings of civilians in Bucha because the name of the city is consonant with the English word "butcher", the word used by President Biden to describe Putin, and that the poisonings of Sergei Skripal and Alexei Navalny were staged by the West as provocations to later blame Russia. He has also compared German Chancellor Olaf Scholz with 'his moustached idol' Adolf Hitler.

The EUvsDisinfo project has documented 195 cases of disinformation emanating from Solovyov's programs since 2015. Novaya Gazeta's analysis of Solovyov's career casts doubt on his current deep commitment to the values and interests of the Putin's regime. At the beginning of his career, Solovyov was a respected independent journalist, but apparently, in some matters, he went on the "false trail" to keep the favor of the Russian authorities. For example, in 2013 he rejected the idea of annexing Crimea, warning that this could lead to an unjustified war and called the peninsula legally belonging to Ukraine. However, just a year later, after the annexation of Crimea by Russia, he declared: "We were bringing this day as close as we could – Crimea and Sevastopol are again part of Russia. Historical justice has prevailed."

Russian dissident Aleksandr Skobov compared Solovyov to Nazi propagandist Julius Streicher, publisher of Der Stürmer, who was hanged by the Nuremberg Tribunal.

== Personal life ==
Vladimir Solovyov is known to have been married three times and has eight children from his marriages. His first wife's name is Olga, and they have two children together.

His second wife's name is Yulia, and they have a daughter.

Since 2001, Solovyov has been married to Helga Solovyova (née Sepp)is a psychologist and daughter of a known Russian satirist Viktor Koklyushkin. She is of Volga German and Estonian descent on her mother's side. Together, they have five children.

In February 2023, he defended his 21-year-old son against critics who asked why his son had not volunteered to fight in Ukraine. Vladimir Solovyov had previously encouraged every able-bodied Russian male to volunteer for service and fight in the war in Ukraine, and condemned young people who left Russia to avoid mobilization.

Solovyov has mentioned that he has Jewish roots and professes Judaism. He also holds a residence permit and tax resident status in Italy for himself and his children from his marriage to Elga Sepp since 2009.

Solovyov is said to have a black belt in kyokushin karate, although it is unclear which federation awarded it to him or under what circumstances. He has only appeared in public in a kimono once, at the hall of an unrecognized federation of Kosiki Karate in Russia. However, he was unable to demonstrate his martial arts technique and his trainers were individuals known for promoting false martial arts.

Solovyov considers himself a Soviet patriot and frequently hosts his program wearing a jacket with a hammer and sickle.

=== Property ===
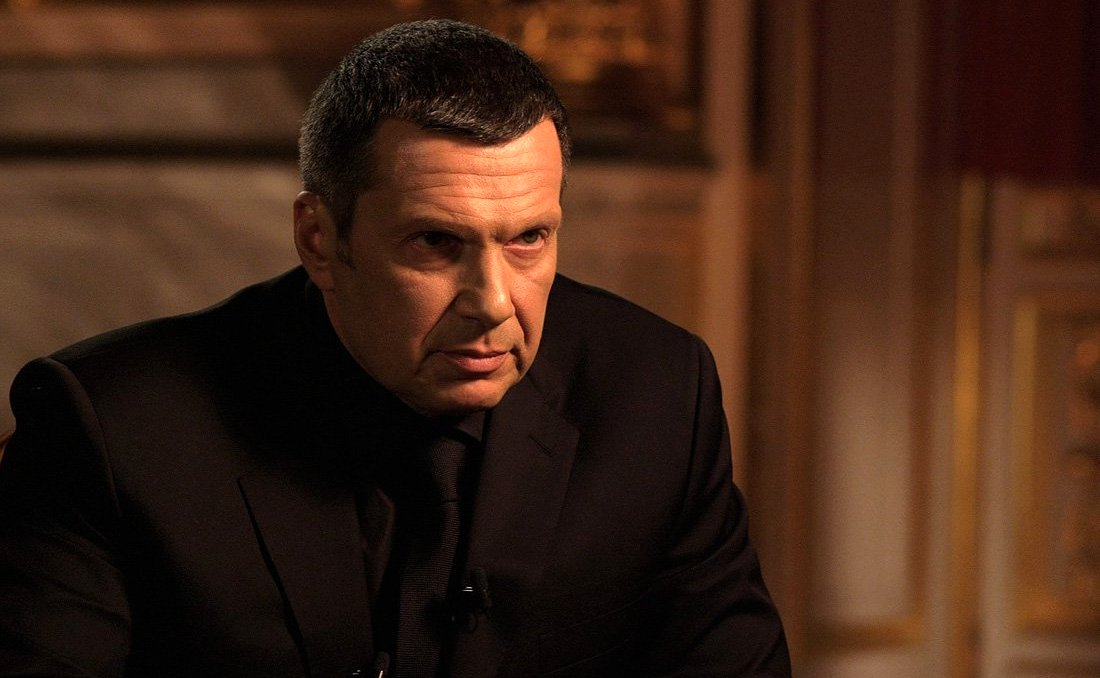
Solovyov in 2015

Solovyov is known to have several properties in both the European Union and the Russian Federation. In the European Union, he has a villa located on the Italian Lake Como, which was discovered by the Anti-Corruption Foundation (FBK) in 2019. Solovyov appeared on Boris Korchevnikov's program "The Fate of a Man" on Russia-1 TV channel, where he confirmed the villa's existence and said he purchased it in the early 2000s for his large family at a time when the property was cheaper than a similar mansion in Rublyovka. He also claimed to have been in business since the Soviet era, to regularly pay taxes, and to have never served in the civil service.

In January 2019, FBK discovered that Solovyov owned a second villa on Lake Como and a Maybach car. In July 2019, FBK found that Solovyov has permanent residency status in Italy; and the next day, the founder of FBK, Alexei Navalny, was arrested.

In February 2022, Russian government agency, Roskomnadzor, due to the FBK's recognition as an extremist organization in Russia, demanded that various media outlets remove publications about a number of FBK investigations, including those containing information about Solovyov's Italian property.

Moreover, after the Russian invasion of Ukraine in 2022, it was discovered that Solovyov had a house in the mountains and another on the coast. The FBK also uncovered that Solovyov had an Italian resident certificate issued to him after buying a villa on Lake Como. On 5 March 2022, two of his villas on Lake Como were seized by the state.

In the Russian Federation, Solovyov owns three apartments in Moscow on Dolgorukovskaya Street. Solovyov also owns a house in the Moscow region with and a dacha.

His Italian villa was vandalized in 2022 following the outbreak of the Ukraine war.

According to the FBK, the total value of Solovyov's real estate in Moscow, the Moscow region, and Pianello del Lario is estimated to be 1 billion rubles. However, Solovyov himself disagrees with this assessment, though he does describe himself as a "rich, wealthy" person.

=== Alleged assassination attempt ===
In April 2022, Vladimir Putin said that the Federal Security Service (FSB) had stopped a Ukrainian neo-Nazi plot to kill Solovyov; the FSB then released video of a raid of the alleged plotters' apartment, where a book signed with the words "Signature unclear", a green wig, three The Sims video game boxes, a Nazi-styled t-shirt, a portrait of Adolf Hitler, and Ukrainian passports were shown. Nataliya Vasilyeva of The Daily Telegraph reported that the video "raised suspicions that the foiled plot may have been a Russian intelligence hoax", as the signature seemed like "an apparent instruction carried out too literally", while The Sims boxes being shown could be an error "instead of mobile phone Sim cards that would have helped frame the plot." The supposed Ukrainian passports were also noted to be outdated.

== Work ==
=== Television ===
- Актуальное интервью «Страсти по Соловьёву»/«Страсти по…»; (Interview of current interest "Passion for Solovyov" / "Passion for ...") — TNT, 1999–2002
- Ток-шоу «Процесс» (совместно с Александром Гордоном); (Talk show "Process" (together with Alexander Gordon)) — ORT, 1999–2001
- Утренний канал "На свежую голову"/ "Сегоднячко на свежую голову" (совместно с Еленой Ильиной); Morning channel "With a fresh mind" / "Today with a fresh mind" (together with Elena Ilyina) — TNT, 2000-2001
- Документальное наблюдение «Завтрак с Соловьёвым»; Documentary observation "Breakfast with Solovyov" — TV-6, 2001–2002; TVS, 2002
- Музыкальная программа "Соловьиная ночь"; Musical program "Nightingale Night" — TV-6, 2001–2002
- Новогоднее шоу "Венеция в Москве" (совместно с Юлией Бордовских); New Year's show "Venice in Moscow" (together with Yulia Bordovskikh) — TV-6, 2001
- Актуальное интервью "Смотрите, кто пришёл!"; Interview of current interest "Look who's here!" — TVS, 2002–2003
- Ток-шоу "Поединок"; Talk show "Duel" — TVS, 2002–2003; Russia-1, 2010–2017
- Теледебаты кандидатов в депутаты Государственной думы РФ и Президента РФ; Television debates of candidates to the State Duma of the Russian Federation and the President of the Russian Federation — Russia-1, 2011–2012, 2018
- Детский конкурс талантов "Синяя птица"; Children's talent contest "Blue Bird", Russia-1
- Ток-шоу "Кто против?" (совместно с Сергеем Михеевым); Talk show "Who is against?" (together with Sergey Mikheev) — Russia-1, 2019

=== Narrative films ===
Year	Title	Role
2000	Агент национальной безопасности — 2 (24 серия — Технология убийства) National Security Agent — 2 (Episode 24 — Killing Technology)	Boris Lopatin, businessman
2004	Только ты… или богатая Лиза Just you... or rich Lisa	Presenter
2005	Богиня прайм-тайма Goddess of Prime Time	Cameo
2006	Парк советского периода Soviet Period Park	Cameo

=== Documentaries ===
- 2013 — «Муссолини. Закат» (Mussolini. Sunset) — author and presenter.
- 2015 — «Президент» (The President) — co-author and presenter.
- 2015 — «Миропорядок» (World Order) — co-author and presenter.
- 2018 — «Миропорядок 2018» (World Order 2018) — author and presenter.

== In popular media ==
On 28 September 2019, Boris Grebenshchikov uploaded the song "Evening M" on his YouTube channel, which described a typical television propagandist. ("M" stands for "Mudozvon", which is a rude Russian word.) Solovyov claimed that Grebenshchikov had "degraded to a coupletist," and also that "there is a program in Russia that has the word "Evening" in its name, alluding to the program "Evening Urgant". Grebenshchikov replied: "There is an insurmountable distance between "Evening U" and "Evening M" – as between dignity and shame."

Evening Urgant's Ivan Urgant parsed the song, hinting in many ways that it is about Solovyov. In September 2019, the song "Evening Bullshitter" was dedicated to Solovyov.

Solovyov then argued that the song is dedicated to the President of Ukraine Volodymyr Zelenskyy. The phrase "Evening M" have become associated with Solovyov, and journalist Vladimir Pozner expressed the opinion that "he deserved what he got" and that Solovyov does great harm to journalism, and he "will not shake his hand at a meeting".

In October 2019, Solovyov got into the Guinness Book of Records for the longest time on television as a host in the span of one week (25 hours 53 minutes and 57 seconds).

On 30 October 2019, the British television channel Channel 4 released the film The World According to Putin. It is a 50-minute set of fragments of Russian political talk shows and Vladimir Putin's speeches. The film included statements by Solovyov, in particular, that "Britain has degraded to the level of a public toilet". According to The Guardian columnist Stuart Jeffries, the film displayed the "propaganda machine in full swing – just the thing to distract from a nation in chaos".

== Awards ==
- In the fall of 2005, Solovyov was awarded the TEFI Russian television prize as the best interviewer.
- In 2013, Solovyov received the Order of Honour from Vladimir Putin.

== Bibliography ==
- Евангелие от Соловьёва. (The Gospel of Solovyov) — 2005. — ISBN 5-98720-006-7. Second edition in 2007.
- Русская рулетка. (Russian roulette) — М.: Eksmo, 2006. — ISBN 978-5-699-10164-1.
- Мы и Они. Краткий курс выживания в России. (We and They. A short course on survival in Russia) — М.: Eksmo, 2007. — ISBN 978-5-699-22098-4.
- Апокалипсис от Владимира. (Apocalypse from Vladimir) — М.: Eksmo, 2007. — ISBN 978-5-699-23434-9. (Continuation of the "Евангелие от Соловьёва").
- Путин. Путеводитель для неравнодушных. (Putin. A guide for those who are not indifferent) — М.: Eksmo, 2008. — ISBN 978-5-699-23807-1.
- Хроники Второго пришествия. (Chronicle of the Second Coming) — М.: Eksmo, 2008. — 544 p. — ISBN 978-5-699-27022-4.
- Противостояние: Россия. (Confrontation: Russia) — USA. — 2009. — ISBN 978-5-699-32158-2. (Co-authored with Nikolai Zlobin).
- Мы — русские! С нами Бог! (We are Russians! God with us!) — 2009. — ISBN 978-5-699-37611-7.
- Соловьёв против Соловьёва. Худеть или не худеть? (Solovyov against Solovyov. To lose weight or not to lose weight?) — М.: Eksmo, 2009. — ISBN 978-5-699-32605-1.
- Минус 80 килограммов! Кто больше? (Minus 80 kilograms! Who is more?) — М.: Eksmo, 2009. — 256 p. — ISBN 978-5-699-32605-1.
- Путин — Медведев. Что дальше? (Putin — Medvedev. What's next?) — М.: Eksmo, 2010. — 384 p. — ISBN 978-5-699-40992-1. (Co-authored with Nikolai Zlobin).
- 1001 вопрос о прошлом, настоящем и будущем России. (1001 questions about the past, present and future of Russia) — М.: Eksmo-Press, 2010. — 288 p. — ISBN 978-5-699-43999-7.
- Русская рулетка. Заметки на полях новейшей истории. (Russian roulette. Notes on the margins of recent history) — М.: Eksmo-Press, 2010. — 352 p. — ISBN 978-5-699-42522-8.
- Манипуляции. Атакуй и защищайся! (Manipulation. Attack and Defend!) — М.: Eksmo, 2011. — 352 p. — ISBN 978-5-699-43859-4.
- Евангелие от Соловьёва. (The Gospel of Solovyov) — М.: Eksmo, 2011. — 352 p. — ISBN 978-5-699-51500-4.
- Враги России. (Enemies of Russia) — М.: Eksmo, 2011. — 320 p. — ISBN 978-5-699-52340-5.
- Последний солдат империи: Юрий Дмитриевич Маслюков в воспоминаниях современников. (The last soldier of the empire: Yuri Dmitrievich Maslyukov in the memoirs of his contemporaries) — М.: Eksmo, 2011. — 224 p., 1 000 cop. — ISBN 978-5-699-50107-6.
- Империя коррупции. Территория русской национальной игры. (Empire of corruption. The territory of the Russian national game) — М.: Eksmo, 2012. — ISBN 978-5-699-54425-7.
- Русский вираж. Куда идёт Россия? (Russian bend. Where is Russia going?) — М.: Eksmo, 2014 (Co-authored with Nikolai Zlobin). — ISBN 978-5-699-73222-7.
- Разрыв шаблона. (Breaking the pattern) — М.: Eksmo, 2015. — 320 p. — ISBN 978-5-699-79372-3.
- Русская тройка. (Russian troika) — М.: Eksmo, 2016. — 735 p. — ISBN 978-5-699-88126-0.
- Апокриф. (Apocrypha) — М.: Eksmo, 2016. — 576 p. — ISBN 978-5-699-88130-7.
- Зачистка: Роман-возмездие. (Sweep: Novel Retribution) — М.: Eksmo, 2016. — 288 p. — ISBN 978-5-699-82232-4>.
- Революция консерваторов. Война миров. (Conservative revolution. War of the Worlds) — М.: Eksmo, 2017. — 320 p. — ISBN 978-5-699-99495-3.
- Сложные переговоры в комиксах. Книга-тренер. (Complex negotiations in comics. Trainer book) — М.: Eksmo, 2018. — 176 p. — ISBN 978-5-04-092386-1.
