= Evening with Vladimir Solovyov =

Russian TV program

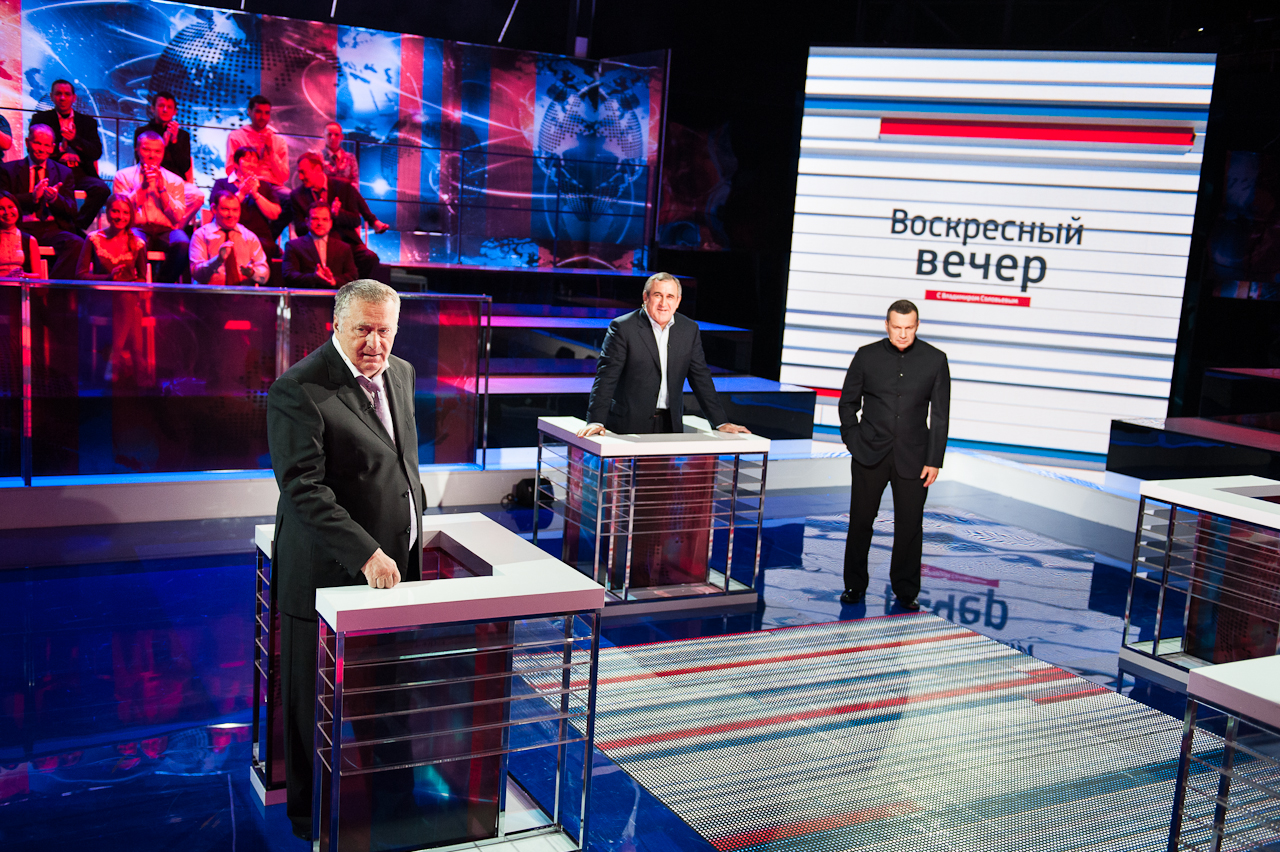
- Genre: Socio-political talk show
- Created by: Vladimir Solovyov; Alexander Levin
- Presented by: Vladimir Solovyov
- Composers: Oleg Emirov (2005-2008); Anton Gryzlov (since 2012)
- Country of origin: Russia
- Original language: Russian
- No. of seasons: 14

Original release
- Network: NTV (2005-2008); Russia-1 (since 2012)

Evening with Vladimir Solovyov (Вечер с Владимиром Соловьёвым) is a long-running socio-political talk show on Russian state television, primarily broadcast on Russia-1.. It is hosted by Vladimir Solovyov, one of Russia’s most prominent and controversial TV presenters. The programme focuses on domestic and international political issues, current affairs, and Russian foreign policy.

The show features panel discussions with politicians, analysts, journalists, and public figures, and is known for its debate-heavy format. The show has become one of the most prominent political programmes on Russian television. Evening with Vladimir Solovyov is reflecting pro-government and pro-Kremlin perspectives, particularly in its coverage of relations with Western countries and military conflicts involving Russia. The programme has attracted significant international criticism for its rhetoric and role in Russian state media messaging.

== Controversies ==
In August 2017, the Russia-1 and RTR-Planeta television channels were criticized by the Lithuanian Radio and Television Commission for inciting war and hatred through a series of broadcasts on these channels. The Lithuanian authorities were outraged by the content of the May 31, 2017, broadcast of Solovyov's program, during which LDPR leader Vladimir Zhirinovsky proposed "putting forward an ultimatum to the Baltic states so that they would withdraw all NATO troops 300 kilometres from the borders of Russia," and if they don't, then - "take certain measures". In response to the allegations, the head of the Directorate of International Relations of VGTRK, Peter Fedorov stated said that all criticism regarding the programs was unfair, and the expert's opinions are "free expression by people of their point of view".
