= Demokratizatsiya (journal) =

- Discipline: Political science
- Language: English
- Edited by: Robert Orttung

Publication details
- History: 1992-present
- Publisher: Institute for European, Russian and Eurasian Studies (George Washington University) (United States)
- Frequency: Quarterly

Standard abbreviations
- ISO 4: Demokratizatsiya

Indexing
- ISSN: 1074-6846 (print); 1940-4603 (web)
- OCLC no.: 222569720

Links
- Journal homepage; Online archive

Demokratizatsiya: The Journal of Post-Soviet Democratization is a quarterly peer-reviewed academic journal established in 1992 covering the changes in the late Soviet Union and post-Soviet states since 1985. It was established by Fredo Arias-King.

Demokratizatsiya (Russian: Демократизация) is the Russian for "democratization".
