= Yevgeny Petrosyan =

Russian comedian

Yevgeny Petrosyan PAR
- Евгений Петросян
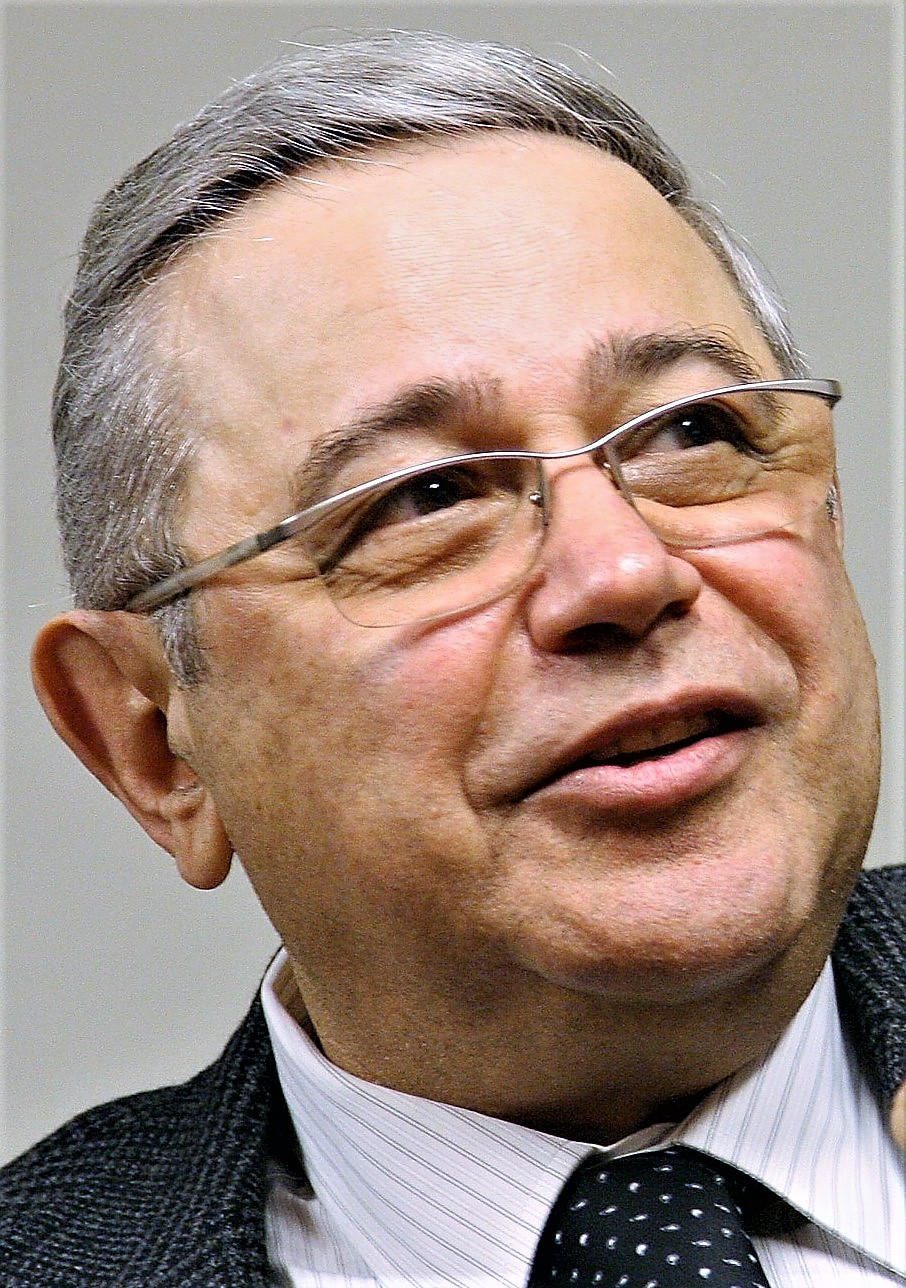
- At a meeting with Runet bloggers in October 2009.
- Born: 16 September 1945 (age 80); Baku, Azerbaijan SSR, Soviet Union
- Years active: 1962 – present
- Title: People’s Artist of the RSFSR (1991)
- Spouse: Yelena Stepanenko
- Awards: Order of Honour

Yevgeny Vaganovich Petrosyan (Russian: Евгений Ваганович Петросян (Петросянц); Armenian: Եվգենի Վահանի Պետրոսյան (Պետրոսյանց), romanized: Yevgeni Vahani Petrosyan (Petrosyants); born 16 September 1945) is a Soviet–Russian comedian of Armenian and Jewish descent. In 2005 he was named among the most influential figures in contemporary Russia, in a survey conducted by independent polling agency The Levada Centre. A popular comedian since the days of the Soviet Union, Petrosyan was the host of TV variety show Crooked Mirror.

== Personal life ==
Yevgeny was married to actress and humorist Yelena Stepanenko (born 1953). Their engagement was in 1985. On August 3, 2018, the Russian mass media announced that Yevgeny and Yelena were getting divorced. They had made 1.5 billion rubles together while married and that money was to be divided among the two by the court of law.

During a 2023 New Year show, Petrosyan openly supported the Russian invasion of Ukraine. In January 2023, Ukraine imposed sanctions on Yevgeny for his support of the invasion.
