= Yelena Stepanenko =

Russian stand-up comic and actor

- Born: April 8, 1953 (age 73); Stalingrad, RSFSR, USSR
- Spouse: Yevgeny Petrosyan (m. 1985; div. 2018)

Comedy career
- Years active: 1979 — present
- Website: stepanenko-e.ru

Yelena Grigorievna Stepanenko (Russian: Еле́на Григо́рьевна Степане́нко; born April 8, 1953, Stalingrad) is a Soviet and Russian entertainer (conversational genre), actress, humorist, TV presenter, parodist, and singer.

== Biography ==
Since 1990, she also starred in movies.

She was awarded the titles Honored Artist of the Russian Federation (1995; for achievements in the field of art) and Order of Friendship (2015; for merits in the development of national culture and many years of fruitful activity).

Since 1985, she was the spouse of the humorist and TV presenter Yevgeny Petrosyan. On July 4, 2018, Stepanenko filed a civil suit for divorce and division of their joint property.
