= Toch-v-Toch =

Russian television series

- Russian: Точь-в-точь!
- Genre: Reality competition
- Presented by: Alexander Oleshko
- Judges: Leonid Yarmolnik (1-6); Anna Bolshova (1); Lyubov Kazarnovskaya (1-4); Gennady Khazanov (1-4); Maksim Averin (2-3, 5); Mikhail Boyarsky (4); Maxim Galkin (5); Sergey Minaev (6); Eva Polna (6); Vadim Galygin (6)
- Country of origin: Russia
- Original language: Russian
- No. of series: 6
- No. of episodes: 62

Production
- Producer: Yury Aksyuta
- Production location: Moscow
- Camera setup: Multiple camera
- Running time: 120 mins. (inc. adverts)
- Production company: WeiT Media

Original release
- Network: Channel One Russia
- Release: 2 March 2014 – 22 December 2024

Related
- Your Face Sounds Familiar

"Toch-v-Toch" (Russian: "Точь-в-точь", "Right to a Tee") is a TV program on Russia's Channel One and the unofficial sequel to the show "One to One!" (the Russian version of the international format "Your Face Sounds Familiar" by "Endemol").

Like its predecessor, "One to One!", "Toch-v-toch" also involves celebrities trying to impersonate well-known musicians, singers and actors, trying to appear as similar as possible. Four jury members and an arbitrator rank the performances, with the winner being the contestant to amass the most points throughout the season.

== Format ==
The show's contestants are singers and actors. In each episode, they need to impersonate a famous musician or actor by performing a song from said celebrity's repertoire, while dressed as them and trying to recreate the way they move, talk and sing. The jury, consisting of four people and an arbitrator, gives the contestants marks for their performances between 1 and 5, so the maximum number of points a person can receive in one episode is 25.

The number of contestants differs from one season to another. The first two seasons, as well as the fourth one, had 12 contestants; the third season had 13 participants; while the fifth season has only ten. While in "Your Face Sounds Familiar" the jury members know in advance who the contestants are, this is not the case with "Toch-v-Toch". In the first episode the jury members have to try to guess the people behind the costumes, while in every consecutive episode the contestants are known already, but still are not announced, and the jury has to guess whose performance they have just watched, while already knowing who the possible contestants are.

== Judges ==
The main jury of the project consists of four people. The only permanent jury member in all five seasons is actor Leonid Yarmolnik. Actor and comedian Gennady Khazanov and opera singer Lyubov Kazarnovskaya were permanent jury members in the first four seasons of the show, while in the fifth season the new permanent jury members are actor Maksim Averin and comedian and season three winner Maksim Galkin.

Each jury member gives a mark to each contestant after they have performed, rating their impersonation from 1 to 5. At the end of the episode, a fifth jury member - the arbitrator, appears, usually also dressed as a famous singer or actor, and also performing a number as that celebrity, before giving his marks to the contestants (also from 1 to 5). The arbitrator is different in each episode, and watches the show from a separate room.

== Series overview ==
Season	Premiere	Final	Prize-winner									Presenter	Main judges (chair's order)			
Season	Premiere	Final	Winner		Runner-up		Third place		Prize from TV Viewer	Prize from Jury		Presenter	1	2	3	4
1	March 2, 2014	June 8, 2014	Irina Dubtsova	Nikita Presnyakov	Gleb Matveychuk		Natalia Podolskaya		Gleb Matveychuk	—N/a		Alexander Oleshko	Leonid Yarmolnik	Anna Bolshova	Lyubov Kazarnovskaya	Gennady Khazanov
2	February 15, 2015	May 31, 2015	Aziza		Aglaya Shilovskaya		Rodion Gazmanov	Taisia Povaliy	Danila Dunaev	Taisia Povaliy		Alexander Oleshko	Leonid Yarmolnik	Maksim Averin	Lyubov Kazarnovskaya	Gennady Khazanov
3	September 20, 2015	January 1, 2016	Evgeny Dyatlov	Maksim Galkin	Lada Dance		Aya		Maksim Galkin	Lada Dance		Alexander Oleshko	Leonid Yarmolnik	Maksim Averin	Lyubov Kazarnovskaya	Gennady Khazanov
4	September 18, 2016	December 25, 2016	Elena Maksimova		Ksana Sergienko	Gleb Matveychuk	Evgeny Dyatlov		Evgeny Dyatlov	Ksana Sergienko	Aglaya Shilovskaya	Alexander Oleshko	Leonid Yarmolnik	Mikhail Boyarsky	Lyubov Kazarnovskaya	Gennady Khazanov
5	February 14, 2021	April 25, 2021	Anastasia Spiridonova		Anastasia Makeeva		Darya Antonyuk		Maria Zaytseva			Alexander Oleshko	Leonid Yarmolnik	Maksim Averin	Invited (Note: Episode 1 - Irina Dubtsova Episode 2 - Kristina Orbakaite Episode 3 - Elena Vaenga Episode 4 - Pelageya Episodes 5, 9-10 - Hibla Gerzmava Episodes 6-7 - Mikhail Boyarsky Episode 8 - Nikolay Fomenko.)	Maksim Galkin
6	September 15, 2024	December 22, 2024	Svetlana Galka	Darya Antonyuk	Yury Titov		Valeriya Astapova		Sergey Volchkov	Yury Titov		Alexander Oleshko	Leonid Yarmolnik	Sergey Minaev	Eva Polna	Vadim Galygin

== Seasons ==
Highest scoring performance and encore
Highest scoring performance
Lowest scoring performance
Prize from TV Viewer
Prize from Jury

=== Season 1 (2014) ===
The following chart contains the names of the iconic singers that the celebrities imitated every week.

Celebrity	Week 1	Week 2	Week 3	Week 4	Week 5	Week 6 (Note: The episode dedicated to cinema.)	Week 7	Week 8 (Note: The episode dedicated to the anniversary of Alla Pugacheva.)	Week 9	Week 10	Week 11	Week 12	Week 13	Week 14 – Final	Points
Irina Dubtsova	Irina Allegrova	Nadezhda Babkina	Toni Braxton	Lyubov Uspenskaya	Laima Vaikule	Faina Ranevskaya (Note: The taper, «Alexander Parkhomenko»)	Nikolay Noskov	Alla Pugacheva (Note: Anna Streltsova, «The Woman who Sings».)	Lady Gaga	Ella Fitzgerald	Elena Vaenga	Ilya Lagutenko	Beyonce	Bonnie Tyler	345
Nikita Presnyakov	Kurt Cobain	Filipp Kirkorov	Sting	Yulia Chicherina	Alexander Ivanov	Eddie Murphy (Note: Donkey, «Shrek»)	Jon Bon Jovi	Vladimir Presnyakov	Vladimir Kristovsky	Detsl	Bruno Mars	P!nk	Chester Bennington & Mike Shinoda	Freddie Mercury	345
Gleb Matveychuk	Alexander Malinin	Igor Nikolaev	Valery Leontiev	Luciano Pavarotti	Zhenya Belousov	Farinelli (Note: Carlo Maria Broschi, «Farinelli»)	Shura	Vladimir Kuzmin	Klaus Meine	Grigory Leps	Chris Norman	Montserrat Caballe	Nikolay Slichenko	Nikolay Baskov	339
Natalia Podolskaya	Arthur Pirozhkov	Whitney Houston	Anzhelika Varum	Christina Aguilera	Amy Winehouse	Lyudmila Gurchenko (Note: Lena Krylova, «Carnival Night»)	Lara Fabian	Alla Pugacheva	Sergey Krylov	Tatyana Shmyga	Sam Brown	Vladimir Presnyakov	Zemfira	Klavdiya Shulzhenko	337
Dmitry Koldun	Valery Kipelov	Steven Tyler	Zhanna Aguzarova	Yury Loza	Joey Tempest	Antonio Banderas (Note: Manito "El Mariachi", «Desperado»)	Alexander Serov	Filipp Kirkorov	Alexander Vasilyev	Vyacheslav Butusov	H.P. Baxxter	Annie Lennox	George Harrison	Sergey Trofimov	331
Sevara	Sade Adu	Natasha Korolyova	Bjork	Linda	Roza Rymbaeva	Audrey Hepburn (Note: Holly Golightly, «Breakfast at Tiffany's»)	Diana Arbenina	Alla Pugacheva	Anna Netrebko	Rihanna	Pelageya	Farrukh Zokirov	Mylene Farmer	Natalya Andreychenko (Note: Mary Poppins, vocal ― Tatyana Voronina, «Mary Poppins, Goodbye»)	330
Vitas	Yury Shatunov	Nikolay Gnatyuk	Zemfira	Soso Pavliashvili	Valery Syutkin	Andrey Mironov (Note: Minister Administrator, «An Ordinary Miracle»)	Sergey Shnurov	Maksim Galkin	Alexander Vertinsky	Eduard Khil	Maria Callas	Glyuk'oZa	Garik Sukachov	PSY	329
Yury Galtsev	Vladimir Mulyavin	Liz Mitchell	Louis Armstrong	Kola Beldy	Lyudmila Zykina	Yury Nikulin (Note: Fool, «Kidnapping, Caucasian Style»)	Toto Cutugno	Boris Moiseev	Tamara Miansarova	Mikhail Shufutinsky	Mikhail Muromov	Klavdiya Shulzhenko	Igor Kornelyuk	Jean-Pierre Barda	326
Tatyana Bulanova	Natali	Zhanna Bichevskaya	Edita Piekha	Natalya Vetlitskaya	Patricia Kaas	Marilyn Monroe (Note: Sugar "Kane" Kowalczyk, «Some Like It Hot»)	Viktor Saltykov	Alla Pugacheva	Sandra	Britney Spears	Maryla Rodowicz	Thomas Anders (Note: with Alexander Oleshko - Dieter Bohlen.)	Cesaria Evora	Ardis	326
Natali	Valentina Tolkunova	Tatyana Bulanova	Olga Zarubina	Alyona Apina	Alsou	Marina Ladynina (Note: Galina Peresvetova, «Cossacks of the Kuban»)	Valeriya	Kristina Orbakaite	Nadezhda Kadysheva	Masha Rasputina	Lyubov Orlova (Note: Anyuta, «Jolly Fellows».)	Sergey Zverev	Lyudmila Senchina	C.C. Catch	319
Jasmin	Verka Serdyuchka	Maya Kristalinskaya	Sofia Rotaru	Valentina Ponomaryova	Jennifer Lopez	Kim Yashpal (Note: Rita Oberoi, voice ― Parvati Khan, «Disco Dancer».)	Dani Klein	Alla Pugacheva	Lolita	Dana International	Tamara Gverdtsiteli	Roman Iagupov	Donna Summer	Dalida	319
Renat Ibragimov	Tom Jones	Evgeny Martynov	Lev Leshchenko	Frank Sinatra	Fyodor Shalyapin	Pavel Luspekaev (Note: Pavel Vereshchagin, «White Sun of the Desert».) (Note: with Alexander Oleshko - Nikolay Godovikov (Petrukha).)	Muslim Magomaev	Alexander Buinov	Willi Tokarev	Mark Bernes	Iosif Kobzon	Alexander Kalyagin (Note: Babbs Babberley, «Hello, I'm Your Aunt!».)	Georg Ots	Nikolay Rastorguev	306
Arbitrator	Elena Vaenga	Larisa Dolina	Valeriya	Mikhail Boyarsky	Olga Kormukhina	Mauricio Shveice	Lev Leshchenko	Alla Pugacheva	Danila Dunaev	Dima Bilan	Filipp Kirkorov	Dmitry Dyuzhev	Tamara Gverdtsiteli		
Arbitrator	Anna German	Elena Obraztsova	Edith Piaf	Mikhail Boyarsky (Note: Imitated himself as a younger one (from Soviet era))	Tina Turner	Adriano Celentano	Joe Dassin		Elvis Presley	Luciano Pavorotti		Alla Bayanova	Mireille Mathieu		

=== Season 2 (2015) ===
The following chart contains the names of the iconic singers that the celebrities imitated every week.

Celebrity	Week 1	Week 2	Week 3	Week 4	Week 5	Week 6	Week 7	Week 8	Week 9	Week 10	Week 11	Week 12	Week 13	Week 14 – Final	Points
Aziza	Dalida	Desireless	Anna German	Lyubov Uspenskaya	Louis Armstrong	Yury Nikulin (Note: Semyon Semyonovich Gorbunkov, «The Diamond Arm»)	Edith Piaf	Edita Piekha	Lolita	Grigory Leps	Klavdiya Shulzhenko	Sarah Brightman	Vladimir Shainsky	Lyudmila Gurchenko	351
Aglaya Shilovskaya	Jennifer Lopez	Anne Veski	Alyona Sviridova	Larisa Golubkina (Note: Shura Azarova, «Hussar Ballad»)	Ani Lorak	Christina Aguilera (Note: Alice Marilyn Rose, «Burlesque»)	Zhanna Aguzarova	Tamara Miansarova	P!nk	Paul Stanley	Keti Topuria	Vera Brezhneva	Yolka	Gloria Gaynor	349
Taisia Povaliy	Sofia Rotaru	Alla Pugacheva	Cher	Verka Serdyuchka	Larisa Dolina	Tatyana Doronina (Note: Nyura, «Three Poplars in Plyushchikha»)	Elena Obraztsova	Irina Ponarovskaya	Nadezhda Babkina	Nikolay Baskov	Gelena Velikanova	Lyudmila Zykina	Svetlana Kryuchkova (Note: Nelli Lednyova, «Big School-Break»)	Montserrat Caballe (Note: with Gleb Matveychuk - Freddie Mercury)	347
Rodion Gazmanov	Maksim Galkin	Taco	Murat Nasyrov	Diana Arbenina	Roman Bilyk	Nikolay Karachentsov (Note: Marquis of Ricardo, «The Dog in the Manger»)	Adam Levine	Bob Marley	Andrey Gubin	Precious Wilson	Oleg Gazmanov	Yury Shevchuk	Jon Bon Jovi	Sting	347
Lydmila Sokolova	Irina Allegrova	Kylie Minogue	Rod Stewart	Tatyana Ovsienko	Olga Kormukhina	Adele	Alexander Ivanov	Marie Fredriksson (Note: with Dmitry Koldun - Per Gessle)	Elena Vaenga	Vladimir Kuzmin	Geri Halliwell	Mariska Veres	Loreen	Alla Pugacheva	346
Stas Kostyushkin	Sergey Lemokh	Alexander Buinov	Grace Jones	Alexander Serov	Dave Gahan	Leonid Utyosov	Evgeny Margulis	Igor Kornelyuk	Frank Sinatra	Laima Vaikule	Bobby McFerrin	Andy Bell	Kris Kelmi	Muslim Magomaev	345
Elena Maksimova	Irina Saltykova	Mireille Mathieu	Vanessa Paradis	Kristina Orbakaite	Michael Jackson	Liza Minnelli (Note: Sally Bowles, «Cabaret») (Note: with Rodion Gazmanov - Joel Grey (The master of ceremonies))	Lady Gaga	Britney Spears	Valery Leontiev	Dima Bilan	Celine Dion	Vitas	Loalwa Braz	Mikhail Boyarsky	343
Oskar Kuchera	Mick Jagger	Igor Sklyar	Leonid Agutin	Arkady Ukupnik	Valery Syutkin	Vasily Vasilyev (Note: Yashka the Gypsy, «The Elusive Avengers»)	John Lennon	Nikolay Noskov	Pyotr Mamonov	Amy Winehouse	Oleg Anofriev	Lou Bega	Igor Nikolaev	Viktor Tsoy	340
Intars Busulis	Nikolay Rastorguev	Billy Joel	Boris Moiseev	Joe Dassin	Phil Collins	Adriano Celentano (Note: Bingo Bongo, «Bingo Bongo»)	Garik Sukachov	Mark Knopfler	Lenny Kravitz	Tina Turner	Eduard Khil	Soso Pavliashvili	Ozzy Osbourne	Elton John	338
Danila Dunaev	Joe Cocker	Francis Rossi	Sergey Galanin	Filipp Kirkorov	Alexander Novikov	Nikita Mikhalkov (Note: Sergey Paratov, «A Cruel Romance»)	Lev Leshchenko	Sergey Skachkov	Stevie Wonder	Lidia Ruslanova	Alexander Marshal	Dieter Bohlen	Anatoly Krupnov	Jay Kay	337
Vlad Topalov	Sergey Zhukov	Yury Antonov	Will Smith (Note: Agent J, «Men in Black»)	Ricky Martin	Nadezhda Kadysheva	Jim Carrey (Note: Stanley Ipkiss, «The Mask»)	George Michael	Ilya Lagutenko	Juanes	Cesaria Evora	Vladimir Markin	Tõnis Mägi	Nicolas Reyes	Robbie Williams	331
Polina Gagarina	Patricia Kaas	Paulina Andreeva (Note: Dina, «The Thaw»)	Lyubov Orlova (Note: Vera Shatrova, «Springtime»)	Shakira	Katy Perry	Natalya Seleznyova (Note: Zinaida Timofeeva, vocal ― Nina Brodskaya, «Ivan Vasilievich Changes Profession»)	Valeriya	Lara Fabian	Polina Gagarina withdrew from the show due to preparations for the Eurovision Song Contest.						189
Arbitrator	Igor Matvienko	Yury Nikolaev	Oleg Gazmanov & Zara	Valery Meladze	Anastasiya Makeeva & Gleb Matveychuk	Vladimir Zeldin	Alexander Ivanov	Valeriya	Lolita	Nikolay Baskov	Sergey Shakurov	Alexander Rosenbaum	Alexander Buinov		
Arbitrator			Al Bano & Romina Power	Vakhtang Kikabidze (Note: Valiko Mizandari, «Mimino»)	Suzi Quatro & Chris Norman		Rod Stewart	Patricia Kaas	Billie Holiday	Sofia Rotaru	Nikolay Kryuchkov (Note: Vasily Bulochkin, «Heavenly Slug»)	Eric Clapton	Tom Jones		

=== Season 3 (2015) ===
The following chart contains the names of the iconic singers that the celebrities imitated every week.

Celebrity	Week 1	Week 2	Week 3	Week 4	Week 5	Week 6	Week 7	Week 8	Week 9	Week 10	Week 11 – Final	Points
Evgeny Dyatlov	Mikhail Boyarsky	Adriano Celentano	Vakhtang Kikabidze	Frank Sinatra	Georg Ots (Note: Mister X, «Mister Iks»)	Tom Jones	Nicolas Reyes	Sergey Chigrakov	Susan Boyle	Ian Gillan	Muslim Magomaev	273
Maksim Galkin	Charles Aznavour	Stas Mikhaylov	Anna German	Till Lindemann	Mithun Chakraborty (Note: Jimmy, vocal — Vijay Benedict, «Disco Dancer»)	Maria Kallas	Boris Grebenshchikov	Garou, Daniel Lavoie & Patrick Fiori	Nikolay Voronov	Alla Pugacheva	Fyodor Shalyapin	273
Lada Dance	C. C. Catch	Edita Piekha	Raffaella Carra	Nani Bregvadze	Alisa Freindlich (Note: Ludmila Prokofievna Kalugina, «Office Romance»)	Sergey Penkin	Billie Holiday	Laima Vaikule	Ani Lorak	Jennifer Lopez	Sofia Rotaru	272
Aya	Aziza	Mariah Carey	Yolka	Antonella Ruggiero	Barbara Brylska (Note: Nadya Shevelyova, vocal - Alla Pugacheva, «The Irony of Fate, or Enjoy Your Bath!»)	Cher	Valentina Tolkunova	Debbie Harry	Sia	Gelena Velikanova	Dan McCafferty	271
Ksana Sergienko	Elena Vaenga	Annie Lennox	Shirley Bassey	Kristina Orbakaite	Shirley Manson	Irina Allegrova	Masha Rasputina	Grace Jones	Stromae	Slava	Freddie Mercury	268
Elena Temnikova	Natali	Zemfira	Kylie Minogue	Ekaterina Ivanchikova	Yana Poplavskaya (Note: Little Red Riding Hood, vocal - Olga Rozhdestvenskaya, «About the Little Red Riding Hood»)	Yulia Volkova (Note: with Aglaya Shilovskaya - Lena Katina)	Pink	Mariya Makarova	Selena Gomez	Keti Topuria	Gwen Stefani	268
Polina Griffis	Madonna	Shura	Pharrell Williams	Lada Dance	Whitney Houston (Note: Rachel Marron, «The Bodyguard»)	Nancy Sinatra	Fergie	Natalya Vetlitskaya	Adele	Jasmin	Beyonce	263
Vladimir Lyovkin	Bogdan Titomir	Leonid Agutin	Evgeny Osin	Kay Metov	Alexander Pankratov-Chyorny (Note: Stepan Grushko, «We Are from Jazz»)	Alexander Ayvazov	Konstantin Kinchev	Nikolay Gnatyuk	Roman Pashkov	Valery Leontiev	John Lennon (Note: with Marina Lyovkina - Yoko Ono)	262
Alexander Bon	Yury Shatunov	Dima Bilan	Simon Le Bon	Ilya Lagutenko	Elvis Presley (Note: Steve Grayson, «Speedway»)	Jaak Joala	Zhenya Belousov	Matt Bellamy	Vasya Oblomov	Morten Harket	Sergey Lazarev	262
Katerina Shpitsa	Gwen Stefani	Nyusha	Anzhelika Varum	Miley Cyrus	Nicole Kidman (Note: Satine, «Moulin Rouge!»)	Zaz	Yulia Savicheva	Avril Lavigne	Carly Jepsen	Mylene Farmer	Polina Gagarina	260
Pyotr Dranga	Valery Meladze	Eminem	Vladimir Kristovsky	Enrique Iglesias	Vyacheslav Tikhonov (Note: Matvey Morozov, «It Happened in Penkovo»)	Seryoga	Justin Timberlake	Alexander Vasilyev	Pyotr Nalich	Jay Kay	Igor Talkov	259
Alexey Glyzin	Al Bano	Alexander Kutikov	Jon Bon Jovi	Alexander Serov	Sergey Garmash (Note: Mels' father, «Stilyagi»)	Billy Joel	Willi Tokarev	Alexander Barykin	Sergey Shnurov	Yury Antonov	Garik Sukachov	255
Anna Shulgina	Valeriya	Pelageya	Lolita	Rihanna	Charlie Chaplin (Note: A factory worker, «Modern Times»)	Eva Polna	MakSim	Valentina Legkostupova	Natali	Yadviga Poplavskaya	Britney Spears	240
Arbitrator	Aziza	Alexander Marshal	Natasha Korolyova	Dmitry Malikov	Anzhelika Varum	Dmitry Kharatyan	Thomas Anders	Elena Vaenga	Dmitry Dyuzhev	Soso Pavliashvili		
Arbitrator	Tatyana Doronina (Note: Natasha Aleksandrova, «Once More About Love»)	Robert Plant	Lyudmila Zykina	Thomas Anders	Lyubov Orlova (Note: Anyuta, «Jolly Fellows»)	Salvatore Adamo		Lidia Ruslanova	Semyon Slepakov	Afric Simone		

=== Season 4 (2016). Superseason ===
In this season, twelve contestants from the previous seasons participated.

The following chart contains the names of the iconic singers that the celebrities imitated every week.

Celebrity	Week 1	Week 2	Week 3	Week 4	Week 5	Week 6	Week 7	Week 8	Week 9	Week 10	Week 11	Week 12 – Final	Points
Elena Maksimova	Christina Aguilera	Zhanna Aguzarova	Lyudmila Gurchenko (Note: Klara Bocardon, «The Straw Hat»)	Bianka	Alisa Voks	Sabrina	Dalida	Lyudmila Gurchenko (Note: with Boris Moiseev)	Lyubov Kazarnovskaya	Larisa Dolina	Ella Fitzgerald	Zemfira	299
Ksana Sergienko	Nadezhda Kadysheva	Freddie Mercury	Ekaterina Vasilyeva (Note: Emilia the First Lady, vocal - Larisa Dolina, «An Ordinary Miracle»)	Donna Summer	Stromae	Rihanna	Olga Kormukhina	Lady Gaga (Note: with Andrey Davidyan ― Tony Bennett)	Sinéad O'Connor	Steven Tyler	Sheryl Crow	Christina Aguilera	298
Gleb Matveychuk	Anna Netrebko	Maïwenn (Note: Diva Plavalaguna, vocal - Inva Mula, «The Fifth Element»)	Gerard Butler & Emmy Rossum (Note: The Phantom & Christine Daae, «The Phantom of the Opera (2004 film)»)	Little Richard	Franzl Lang	Bryan Adams	Valery Obodzinsky	Grigory Leps (Note: with Lydmila Sokolova ― Ani Lorak)	The Mad Stuntman	Vladimir Kuzmin	Ozzy Osbourne	Placido Domingo (Note: with Ekaterina Lyokhina ― Teresa Stratas)	298
Evgeny Dyatlov	Bono	Alexander Serov	Alexander Kalyagin (Note: Babbs Babberley, «Hello, I'm Your Aunt!»)	Yves Montand	Basta	Vladimir Vysotsky	Scatman John	Peter Gabriel (Note: with Aya ― Kate Bush)	Dmitry Khvorostovsky	Robbie Williams	Tennessee Ernie Ford	Nikolay Karachentsov	297
Aglaya Shilovskaya	Marina Khlebnikova	Alla Pugacheva	Catherine Zeta-Jones (Note: Velma Kelly, «Chicago»)	Ekaterina Ivanchikova	Polina Gagarina	Aya	Shakira	Kylie Minogue (Note: with Nikita Presnyakov ― Nick Cave)	Aretha Franklin (Note: Mrs. Murphy, «The Blues Brothers»)	Katy Perry	Valeriya	Lara Fabian	296
Nikita Presnyakov	David Bowie	Freddie Mercury	Ewan McGregor (Note: Christian, «Moulin Rouge!»)	Serj Tankian	Thom Yorke	Keith Flint	Timati	Nick Cave (Note: with Aglaya Shilovskaya ― Kylie Minogue)	Roman Bilyk	Robbie Williams	Pascal	Jared Leto	296
Irina Dubtsova	Adele	Cher	Irina Muravyova (Note: Nina Solomatina, vocal - Zhanna Rozhdestvenskaya, «Carnival (1981 film)»)	Ekaterina Shavrina	Meghan Trainor	Anastacia	Lolita	Mariah Carey (Note: with Polina Griffis ― Whitney Houston)	Nastya Kamenskykh (Note: with Stas Kostyshkin - Potap)	Katy Perry	Alla Pugacheva	Liza Minnelli	296
Lada Dance	Klavdiya Shulzhenko	Alla Pugacheva	Marilyn Monroe (Note: Lorelei Lee, «Gentlemen Prefer Blondes (1953 film)»)	Kylie Minogue	Ivan Mladek (Note: with Valery Keft ― Ivo Pešák)	Irina Ponarovskaya	Vadim Mulerman	Valery Leontiev (Note: with Elena Temnikova ― Laima Vaikule)	Irina Allegrova	Lolita	Klaus Meine	Loreen	295
Natalia Podolskaya	Celine Dion	Maïwenn (Note: Diva Plavalaguna, vocal - Inva Mula, «The Fifth Element»)	Jessica Rabbit (Note: vocal - Amy Irving, «Who Framed Roger Rabbit»)	Tamara Miansarova	Taylor Swift	Laima Vaikule	Beyonce	Elena Vaenga (Note: with Mikhail Bublik)	Madonna	Larisa Dolina	Lyubov Orlova (Note: Anyuta, «Jolly Fellows»)	Patricia Kaas	294
Aziza	Kola Beldy	Cher	Larisa Guzeeva (Note: Larisa Ogudalova, vocal - Valentina Ponomaryova, «A Cruel Romance»)	Shirley Bassey	Peng Liyuan	Elvis Presley	Olga Voronets	Leonid Utyosov (Note: with Tatyana Bulanova ― Edith Utyosova)	PSY	Lolita	Dolores O'Riordan	Anna German	294
Rodion Gazmanov	Sergey Lazarev	Zhanna Aguzarova	Oleg Dal (Note: Anatoly Barygin-Amurskiy, «It Can't Be!»)	Andrey Zaporozhets (Note: with Ivan Dolmatov ― Sergey Babkin)	Bruno Mars	Seal	Lyova Bi-2	Sting (Note: with Intars Busulis ― Stevie Wonder)	Leonid Agutin	Vladimir Kuzmin	Robin Thicke	Nikolay Rastorguev	293
Dmitry Koldun	Mikhail Gorsheniov	Alexander Serov	Veniamin Smekhov (Note: Athos, vocal - Vyacheslav Nazarov, «D'Artagnan and Three Musketeers»)	Alexander Marshal	Billy Gibbons (Note: with Gerogy Koldun ― Dusty Hill)	Vladimir Presnyakov	James Hetfield	Denis Klyaver (Note: with Stas Kostyshkin)	James Blunt	Steven Tyler	Gleb Samoylov (Note: with Vladimir Lyovkin - Vadim Samoylov)	Paul Stanley	292
Arbitrator	Maksim Galkin	Vitas	Maksim Galkin	Igor Nikolaev	Alexander Malinin	Lolita	Olga Kormukhina	Tamara Gverdtsiteli & Nikolay Baskov	Maksim Galkin	Ani Lorak	Vladimir Presnyakov		
Arbitrator	Alexander Gradsky	Brian Johnson	Vladimir Tolokonnikov (Note: Polygraph Polygraphovich Sharikov, «Heart of a Dog (1988 film)»)	Vladimir Mulyavin	Andrea Bocelli	Edita Piekha	Prince	Montserrat Caballe & Nikolay Baskov	Julio Iglesias	Celine Dion	Robert Plamer		

=== Season 5 (2021) ===
The following chart contains the names of the iconic singers that the celebrities imitated every week.

Celebrity	Week 1	Week 2	Week 3	Week 4	Week 5	Week 6	Week 7	Week 8	Week 9	Week 10 - Final	Points
Anastasiya Spiridonova	Lyubov Uspenskaya	Lady Gaga	Tina Turner	Larisa Dolina	Nadezhda Kadysheva	Diana Ross	Anastacia	Irina Allegrova	Adele	Aretha Franklin	249
Anastasiya Makeeva	Lolita	LOBODA	Dani Klein	Sabrina	Irina Ponarovskaya	Maya Kristalinskaya	Lyudmila Gurchenko	Liza Minnelli (Note: Sally Bowles, «Cabaret»)	Ella Fitzgerald	Pelageya	247
Darya Antonyuk	Alla Pugacheva	Beyonce	Whitney Houston	Britney Spears	Donna Summer	Anna German	Elena Vaenga	Aida Vedishcheva	Gwen Stefani	Christina Aguilera	245
Dominik Joker	Sergey Zhukov	Mikhail Shufutinsky	Elton John	Rag'n'Bone Man	Alexander Bard	Willi Tokarev	Bogdan Titomir	Louis Armstrong	Bobby McFerrin	Soso Pavliashvili	244
Alexander Panayotov	Elvis Presley	Alexander Gradsky	Sofia Rotaru	George Michael	Muslim Magomaev	Luciano Pavarotti	Stevie Wonder	Basta	Frank Sinatra	Filipp Kirkorov	243
Alyona Sviridova	Valery Leontiev	Annie Lennox	Lyudmila Senchina	Amy Winehouse	Marilyn Monroe (Note: Amanda Dell, «Let's Make Love»)	Camila Cabello	Eduard Khil	Prince	Zhanna Aguzarova	Laima Vaikule	242
Alexander Shoua	Ray Charles	Leonid Agutin	Eros Ramazzotti	Sergey Mazaev	James Hetfield	Joe Cocker	Tom Jones	Vladimir Kuzmin	Alexander Serov	Freddie Mercury	239
Valeriya Lanskaya	Billie Eilish	Anna Netrebko	Linda	Ani Lorak	Yolka	Dimash Qudaibergen	Barbra Streisand	Zemfira	Lyubov Orlova (Note: Marion Dixon, «Circus»)	Natalia Oreiro	239
Mitya Fomin	Robbie Williams	Ilya Prusikin	Lev Leshchenko	Lyova Bi-2	Maksim Pokrovsky	Zhenya Belousov	Neil Tennant	Paul Stanley	Karel Gott	Afric Simone	233
Mariya Zaytseva	Cher	Max Barskih	Vladimir Presnyakov	Rihanna	Keti Topuria	Madonna	Diana Arbenina	Dolores O'Riordan	Maria Zaytseva withdrew from the show due to infection with COVID-19		198
Arbitrator	Lolita	Polina Gagarina	Emin	Evgeny Dyatlov	Nonna Grishaeva	Taisia Povaliy	Igor Krutoy & Irina Dubtsova	Tamara Gverdtsiteli	Elena Vaenga	Filipp Kirkorov	
Arbitrator	Cesaria Evora	Edith Piaf	Elvis Presley	Roy Orbison	Anzhelika Varum	Alla Pugacheva	Igor Krutoy & Irina Allegrova	Montserrat Caballe	Valentina Tolkunova		

=== Season 6 (2024) ===
The following chart contains the names of the iconic singers that the celebrities imitated every week.

Celebrity	Week 1	Week 2	Week 3	Week 4	Week 5	Week 6	Week 7	Week 8	Week 9	Week 10	Week 11	Week 12	Week 13	Week 14 - Final	Points
Svetlana Galka	Lolita	Alisa Freindlich	Alla Bayanova	Lyudmila Gurchenko	Marina Khlebnikova	Alexander Kalyagin (Note: Babbs Babberley, «Hello, I'm Your Aunt!».)	Klavdiya Shulzhenko	Anne Veski	Kristina Orbakaite	Svetlana Kryuchkova (Note: Nelli Lednyova, «Big School-Break».)	Kim Yashpal (Note: Rita Oberoi, vocal — Parvati Khan, «Disco Dancer».)	Dmitry Kharatyan	Tatyana Ovsienko (Note: vocal — Margarita Suhankina)	Maryla Rodowicz	346
Darya Antonyuk	Shakira	Eva Polna (Note: The encore number was cut from the air because of the timing. At the end of the episode, the background song was «Беги от меня», which Darya Antonyuk performed in the image of Eva Polna.)	Maya Kristalinskaya	Adele	Tatyana Ivanova	Ilya Lagutenko	Bianka	Catherine Zeta-Jones (Note: Velma Kelly, «Chicago»)	Anna Netrebko	Whitney Houston (Note: Rachel Marron, «The Bodyguard») (Note: Darya Antonyuk has already been in the image of Whitney Houston (season 5, episode 3). Then she scored 25 points.)	Lyudmila Senchina	Jennifer Lopez	P!nk	Madonna	346
Yury Titov	Valentina Tolkunova	Ricky Martin	Oleg Gazmanov	Valery Leontiev	Dima Bilan	Kola Beldy	Vladimir Shainsky	Eduard Khil	Tom Jones	Andrey Mironov (Note: Minister Administrator, «An Ordinary Miracle».)	Iosif Kobzon	Leonid & Edith Utyosovy	Franzl Lang	Anna German	345
Valeriya Astapova	Larisa Dolina	Zivert	Lady Gaga (Note: with Kirill Astapov ― Bradley Cooper.)	Tatyana Bulanova	Irina Muravyova (Note: Nina Solomatina (voice ― Zhanna Rozhdestvenskaya) ― «Carnival».)	Ekaterina Ivanchikova	Anzhelika Varum	Diana Arbenina	Patricia Kaas	Ekaterina Savinova (Note: Frosya Burlakova, «Come Tomorrow, Please...».)	Celine Dion	Valeriya	Masha Rasputina	Édith Piaf	344
Lada Dance	Elena Vaenga	Irina Ponarovskaya (Note: Lada Dance has already been in the image of Irina Ponarovskaya (season 4, episode 6). Then she scored 25 points.)	Desireless	Edita Piekha (Note: Lada Dance has already been in the image of Edita Piekha (season 3, episode 2). Then she scored 24 points.)	Tõnis Mägi	Sade Adu	Sophia Loren (Note: Lucia Curcio, «It Started in Naples».)	Irina Allegrova (Note: Lada Dance has already been in the image of Irina Allegrova (season 4, episode 9). Then she scored 25 points.)	Alexander Ivanov	Natalya Seleznyova (Note: Zinaida Timofeeva, vocal ― Nina Brodskaya, «Ivan Vasilievich Changes Profession».)	C. C. Catch (Note: Lada Dance has already been in the image of C. C. Catch (season 3, episode 1). Then she scored 25 points.)	Elena Obraztsova	Larisa Guzeeva (Note: Larisa Ogudalova, vocal - Valentina Ponomaryova, «A Cruel Romance»)	Raffaella Carra (Note: Lada Dance has already been in the image of Raffaella Carra (season 3, episode 3). Then she scored 25 points.)	343
Karina Koks	Zhanna Aguzarova	Kylie Minogue	Yolka	Yury Shatunov	Polina Gagarina	Nadezhda Kadysheva	Niletto	Cesaria Evora	Natalya Vetlitskaya	Natalya Andreychenko (Note: Mary Poppins, vocal ― Tatyana Voronina, «Mary Poppins, Goodbye».)	Andrey Gubin	Cher	Dalida	Linda	342
Evgeny Gor	Sergey Zhukov	Leonid Agutin	Sergey Mazaev	Jony	Joe Dassin	Valery Obodzinsky	Frank Sinatra	Soso Pavliashvili	Nadezhda Babkina	Leonid Kuravlyov (Note: George Miloslavsky, vocal — Valery Zolotukhin, «Ivan Vasilievich: Back to the Future».)	Alexey Glyzin	Igor Kornelyuk	Igor Nikolaev	Seryoga	342
Nikita Malinin	Michael Jackson	Garik Sukachov	Mot	Shura	Alexander Vertinsky	Sting (Note: Nikita Malinin has already been in the image of Sting in another reincarnation show ― «One to One!» (season 3, episode 14).)	Vladimir Shakhrin	Eros Ramazzotti	Vadim Samoylov	Jim Carrey (Note: Stanley Ipkiss, «The Mask».)	Vladimir Presnyakov	Justin Timberlake	Sergey Shnurov	Alexander Malinin (Note: Nikita Malinin has already been in the image of Alexander Malinin in another reincarnation show ― «One to One!» (season 3, episode 10).)	341
Sergey Volchkov	Georg Ots	Lev Leshchenko	Alexander Serov	Elvis Presley	Dmitry Khvorostovsky	Fyodor Shalyapin	Vladimir Mulyavin	Lyudmila Zykina	Mikhail Krug	Pavel Luspekaev (Note: Pavel Vereshchagin, «White Sun of the Desert».)	Pyotr Leshchenko	Muslim Magomaev	Nikolay Rasrorguev	Basta	340
Sergey Voytenko	Khabib	Stas Mikhaylov	Nikolay Rybnikov (Note: Sasha Savchenko, «Spring on Zarechnaya Street».)	Vladimir Kuzmin	Viktor Rybin	Arkady Ukupnik	Nikolay Karachentsov (Note: Marquis of Ricardo, «The Dog in the Manger».)	Evgeny Martynov	Sergey Trofimov	Mikhail Vodyanoy (Note: Popandopulo, «Wedding in Malinovka».)	Nikolay Baskov	Sergey Minaev	Psy	Sergey Krylov	336
Arbitrator	Alexander Buinov	Irina Nelson	Taisia Povaliy	Evgeny Dyatlov	Alexander Panayotov	Alexander Shpagin	Gennady Khazanov	Larisa Dolina	Ilona Bronevitskaya	Olga Kormukhina	Alexey Glyzin & Alexandra Vorobyova	Nonna Grishaeva	Alyona Sviridova	Sergey Minaev & Sergey Minaev Jr.	—N/a
Arbitrator	Louis Armstrong	Anzhelika Varum	Tatyana Doronina (Note: Natasha Aleksandrova, «Once More About Love») (Note: Taisia Povaliy has already been in the image of Tatyana Doronina when she participated of the project (season 2, episode 6).)	Elton John	George Michael (Note: Alexander Panayotov has already been in the image of George Michael when he participated of the project (season 5, episode 4).)	Vladimir Vysotsky	Arkady Raikin (Note: Gennady Khazanov has already been in the image of Arkady Raikin in another reincarnation show ― «One to One!» (season 3, episode 14) when he showed an out-of-competition number as a member of the jury in the Final of season 1.)	Gloria Gaynor	Edita Piekha	Tina Turner (Note: Olga Kormukhina has already been in the image of Tina Turner when he was an arbitrator (season 1, episode 5).)	Al Bano & Romina Power (Note: Alexey Glyzin has already been in the image of Al Bano when he participated of the project (season 3, episode 1).)	Lyubov Uspenskaya	Lyubov Orlova (Note: Anyuta, «Jolly Fellows») (Note: Alyona Sviridova has already been in the image of Lyubov Orlova in another reincarnation show ― «One to One!» (season 2, episode 3) when she participated in it.)	Dieter Bohlen & Thomas Anders	—N/a
