= Aleksandr Serov =

Aleksandr Serov may refer to:

- Alexander Serov (1820–1871), Russian composer
- Alexander Serov (cyclist) (born 1982), Russian cyclist
- Aleksander Serov (born 1954), Ukrainian-born Russian popular singer
