= Kto khochet stat' millionerom? =

Russian television quiz show

- Logo from 2008 to 2022
- Russian: Кто хочет стать миллионером?
- Directed by: Konstantin Ivanov and Tatyana Dmitrakova (2001—2008); Maxim Utkin (2008-)
- Presented by: Maxim Galkin (2001–2008); Dmitry Dibrov (1999–2001, 2008–2022, 2025); Yulianna Karaulova (2023–present); Mariya Kiselyova (special episode of 2002)
- Composers: Keith Strachan; Matthew Strachan (1999 - 2008, 2023 - present); Ramon Covalo; Nick Magnus (2008 - 2022)
- Country of origin: Russia

Production
- Producers: Sergey Kordo (1999—2008); Ilya Krivitsky (2008-)
- Production location: Mosfilm
- Camera setup: multi-camera
- Running time: 50 minutes (70 minutes with commercials)
- Production companies: WMedia (2001—2008); Krasny Kvadrat (2008-)

Original release
- Network: Channel One (2001-); ONT (2002-)
- Release: 19 February 2001 – present

Кто хочет стать миллионером? (English translation: Who Wants To Be A Millionaire?, transliteration: Kto khochet stat' millionerom?) is a Russian game show based on the original British format of Who Wants to Be a Millionaire?. The show is hosted by Yulianna Karaulova and Dmitry Dibrov (earlier by Maxim Galkin).

Кто хочет стать миллионером? is broadcast from 19 February 2001 to today. It is shown on the Russian TV station Channel One on Saturdays at 4:55 PM. The show is set in an original format.

== Broadcast history ==
The Russian version of the series premiered on October 1, 1999, on NTV. Initially, the program was called, "O, schastlivchik!" ("Oh, Lucky Man!"), presented by Dmitry Dibrov. The game combines the simplicity of the rules to provide an opportunity to win the top prize of 1 million rubles. The series gained enormous popularity among Russian audiences, and in 2000, was awarded a Taffy award for Best Entertainment Program.

On February 19, 2001, the program moved to channel ORT (Channel One) and was renamed to its current title to reflect the name of the franchise. Dibrov departed the show, and was succeeded by comedian Maxim Galkin. On September 17, 2005, the money tree was revised, with the top prize now worth 3 million rubles.

On December 21, 2008, Dibrov returned to hosting the show once more and presented the show until June 18, 2022.

Production of the program was suspended in 2022 as a result of the Russian invasion of Ukraine after format owner Sony Pictures Television chairman and chief executive officer Tony Vinciquerra announced Sony was ceasing all work, including licencing of formats, in Russia. In 2023, the show returned with Yulianna Karaulova as the host replacing Dibrov of an unauthorised, unlicenced version without permission from Sony, which refuses to do work with Russia.

== Rule of game ==
=== Main game ===
The main goal of the game is to win 3 million Russian roubles (originally 1 million Russian roubles) by answering 15 multiple-choice questions correctly. There are three lifelines: Fifty Fifty (50 на 50, 50 na 50), Phone A Friend (звонок другу, zvonok drugu), and Ask the Audience (помощь зала, pomoshch' zala).

== Payout structure ==
Question number	Question value (in Russian Rubles) (Yellow zones are the guaranteed levels)			
Question number	Classic format			Risk format
Question number	2001–2005	2005–2011 2023–present	2008	2010–2022
1	100	500	500	500
2	200	1,000	1,000	1,000
3	300	2,000	2,000	2,000
4	500	3,000	3,000	3,000
5	1,000	5,000	5,000	5,000
6	2,000	10,000	10,000	10,000
7	4,000	15,000	15,000	15,000
8	8,000	25,000	25,000	25,000
9	16,000	50,000	50,000	50,000
10	32,000	100,000	100,000	100,000
11	64,000	200,000	200,000	200,000
12	125,000	400,000	400,000	400,000
13	250,000	800,000	800,000	800,000
14	500,000	1,500,000	1,500,000	1,500,000
15	1,000,000	3,000,000	3,000,000	3,000,000

== Old game's version ==
Earlier, the game was called О, счастливчик! (O Lucky Man!) and it was shown on NTV.

Oh, lucky man!
- Logo of О, счастливчик!
- Russian: О, счастливчик!
- Presented by: Dmitry Dibrov
- Country of origin: Russia

Production
- Running time: 39 minutes
- Production company: Ways PRO

Original release
- Network: NTV
- Release: 1 October 1999 – 28 January 2001

It was broadcast from 1 October 1999 to 27 January 2001. It was shown on the Russian TV station NTV. In 2001, the show was superseded by a second adoption named Кто хочет стать миллионером? and aired on public Russian broadcaster Channel One. For a while TNT broadcast reruns of О, счастливчик! episodes.

=== Special Events ===
- The first game was shown a special project for a few days before the new year 2000. The game was attended by leading NTV journalists and Leonid Parfyonov, Andrey Norkin, Vladimir Kara-Murza, Victor Shenderovich, Lev Novozhenov, Yevgeny Kiselyov, Alexander Belyayev and others. In the same game was born the concept of «zone of Shenderovich» - questions after the sixth and the «zone of the Kara-Murza» - after the tenth question.
- A month before the 2000 presidential election in a game attended by the four presidential candidates: Stanislav Govorukhin, Ella Pamfilova, Yevgeny Savostyanov and Umar Dzhabrailov.
- At the end of the first season held a special issue devoted to the eighth birthday of the tax police in Moscow, which was attended by employees of departments.
- A few months before the New Year 2001, the production team conducted a poll among the audience, whom they would like to see in New Year's special edition of the game. The poll has been won for Russia's on-going President Vladimir Putin, but for obvious reasons, he refused to participate, but he sent a letter. The New Year's special was attended by prominent journalists, politicians and artists: Svetlana Sorokina, Sergey Shoigu, Vladimir Zhirinovsky, Detsl, etc. When Svetlana Sorokina ended her game, she offered the host, Dmitriy Dibrov, to switch places, and he failed to answer the eleventh question correctly and won 32,000 rubles.

== Notable contestants ==
=== Top prize winners ===
- Igor Sazeev (Игорь Сазеев) from Saint Petersburg. (12 March 2001)
- Irina Chudinovskikh and Yuriy Chudinovskikh (Ирина Чудиновских и Юрий Чудиновских) from Kirov. (18 January 2003)
- Svetlana Yaroslavtseva (Светлана Ярославцева) from Troitsk. (19 February 2006)
- Timur Budayev (Тимур Будаев) from Pyatigorsk. (17 April 2010)
- Bari Alibasov and Alexander «Danko» Fadeev (Бари Алибасов и Александр «Данко» Фадеев). (23 November 2013)
- Yulianna Karaulova and Timur Solovyov (Юлианна Караулова и Тимур Соловьев). (2 December 2017)

=== Top Prize Losers ===
- Galina Semyonova (Галина Семёнова) lost 468,000 rubles on 22 January 2005.
- Vladimir Yefremov (Владимир Ефремов) lost 700,000 rubles on 30 April 2011.
- Dušan Perović and Yekaterina Andreyeva (Душан Перович и Екатерина Андреева) lost 1,100,000 rubles on 1 April 2017.
- Viktor Verzhbitskiy and Andrey Burkovskiy (Виктор Вержбицкий и Андрей Бурковский) lost 1,300,000 rubles on 27 May 2017.
- Viktor Vasilyev and Gavriil Gordeyev (Виктор Васильев и Гавриил Гордеев) lost 1,100,000 rubles on 11 November 2017.
- Keti Topuria and Vladimir Miklosich (Кэти Топурия и Владимир Миклошич) lost 1,300,000 rubles on 17 February 2018.
- Alexander Druz and Viktor Sidnev (Александр Друзь и Виктор Сиднев) lost 1,300,000 rubles on 12 December 2018. (Druz cheated.)
- Irina Pudova and Vasilisa Volodina (Ирина Пудова и Василиса Володина) lost 1,100,000 rubles on 9 October 2021.
- Anna Mishina and Gennady Smirnov (Анна Мишина и Геннадий Смирнов) lost 1,100,000 rubles on 11 December 2021.

=== Top Prize Walkers ===
- Sergey Strokin (Сергей Строкин) from Moscow (10 June 2000).
- Gennadiy Sostrovchuk (24 November 2001).
- Konstantin Fedchenko (10 December 2001).
- Olga Krayushkina (4 November 2002).
- Leonid Agutin and Anzhelika Varum (8 January 2005).
- Valentin Smirnitsky (Валентин Смирни́тский) (6 March 2005).
- Sergey Bobris (Сергей Бобрис) from Belgorod. (5 February 2011).
- Aleksandr Kuzin (Александр Кузин) from Oryol. (24 March 2012).
- Leonid Panyukov (Леонид Панюков) from Kostroma. (29 September 2012)
- Mikhail Boyarsky and Valentin Smirnitsky (Михаил Боярский и Валентин Смирни́тский) (16 May 2015)
- Dana Borisova and Alexander Gudkov (Дана Борисова и Александр Гудков). (24 June 2018)
- Anna Kamenkova and Yury Grymov (Анна Каменкова и Юрий Гримов). (18 August 2018)
- Ilia Averbukh and Roman Kostomarov (Илья Авербух и Роман Костомаров). (23 March 2019)
- Victoria Lopyreva and Mikhail Grushevsky (Виктория Лопырёва и Михаил Грушевский). (21 December 2019)
- Anton Komolov and Viktor Vasilyev (Антон Комолов и Виктор Васильев). (8 January 2020)
