= Olga Kormukhina =

Russian singer (born 1960)

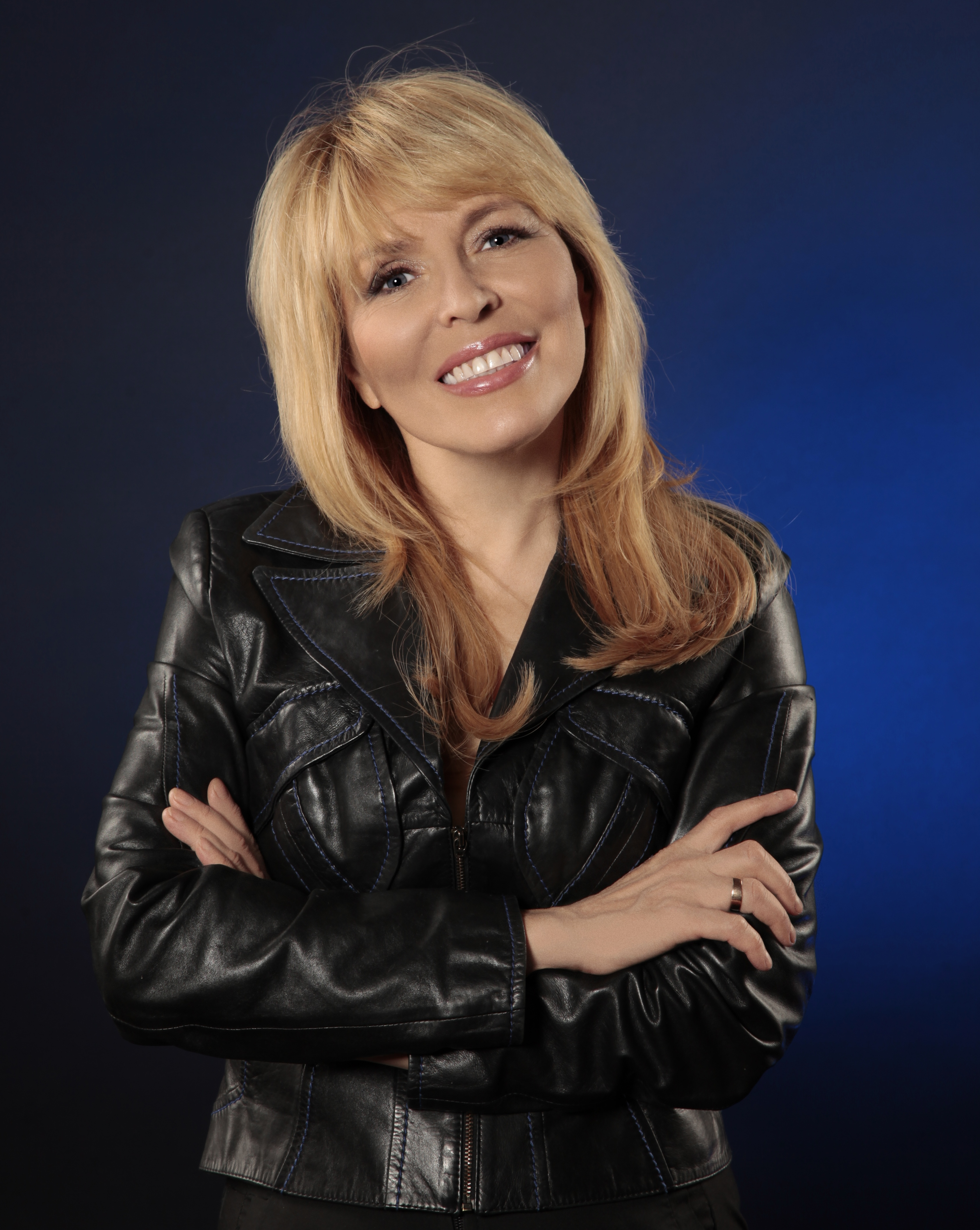
- Born: Olga Borisovna Kormukhina; 1 June 1960 (age 65); Gorky
- Occupation: Singer
- Years active: 1986–present
- Title: Honored Artist of the Russian Federation (2016)
- Spouse: Aleksei Belov
- Children: 1
- Website: olgakormuhinaofficial.ru

Olga Borisovna Kormukhina (Russian: О́льга Бори́совна Корму́хина, born 1 June 1960, Gorky, RSFSR) is a Russian singer. Honored Artist of the Russian Federation (2016).

== Biography ==
Olga Kormukhina was born on June 1, 1960, in the city of Gorky, Gorky Oblast. She studied at the Chkalov Gorky Engineering and Construction Institute (Nizhny Novgorod State University of Architecture and Civil Engineering). Her first singing performance was at the 1980 Nizhny Novgorod Spring Universe Jazz Rock Festival where she won the award for the best solo vocal performance. The talent of Kormukhina was spotted by the famous jazz conductor Oleg Lundstrem, who persuaded the young singer to move to Moscow and study at the Gnessin State Musical College. During her studies she performed with his orchestra.

In 1987, she became part of the band "Rock Atelier", front-lined by Kris Kelmi.

Later Kormukhina left the band. At the initiative of Ovanes Malkik-Pashaev, Kormukhina became a vocalist of the Krasnaya Pantera group. In 1989 the band collapsed.

After the breakdown of Krasnaya Pantera, Kormukhina began a solo career. In 1991, she released her first solo album "Beyond the edge of words". In 1992 the singer won the Ovation Award for Best Rock Singer of the Year.

A several-year creative break followed, which was interrupted in 1997 when the clip for the song "Right for love" came out.

In 1999 she married guitarist Aleksei Belov, who wrote a large portion of Kormukhina's hits. In 2005, the song "I am falling into the sky" was released, which was also the title song for the album of the same name released in 2012.

In 2014 Kormukhina and Belov with the members of Gorky Park took part in the closing ceremony of the Sochi Olympics with the song "Moscow Calling". The singer also appeared in the TV shows "Two Stars" and Toch-v-Toch.

In 2016, Olga Kormukhina's last album "Sol" was released. In November 2016 the singer presented her new concert program "Indigo".

In April or May 2022, Kormukhina participated in a concert organized in order to support the Russian invasion of Ukraine.

== Discography ==
- 1988 — Olga Kormukhina and Rock Atelier (LP, EP)
- 1989 — The Time Has Come (LP) (unpublished)
- 1991 — Beyond the Edge of Words (LP)
- 2011 — I am Falling Into the Sky (maxi-single)
- 2012 — I am Falling Into the Sky (CD)
- 2012 — I Believe (in memory of Gunnar Graps) (single)
- 2014 — Moscow Calling (Olga Kormukhina / Aleksei Belov) (single)
- 2014 — I am Falling Into the Sky of Moscow Art Theatre (DVD)
- 2014 — I am Like You (Olga Kormukhina / Aleksei Belov) (single)
- 2015 — Cries and Whispers (Olga Kormukhina / Aleksei Belov) (album)
- 2015 — We Were Taught to be Birds (single)
- 2015 — Talk, Do Not Stay Silent (Olga Kormukhina / Aleksei Belov) (single)
- 2016 — Sol (Olga Kormukhina / Aleksei Belov) (album)
