= Valeriya =

Russian singer (born 1968)

- Валерия
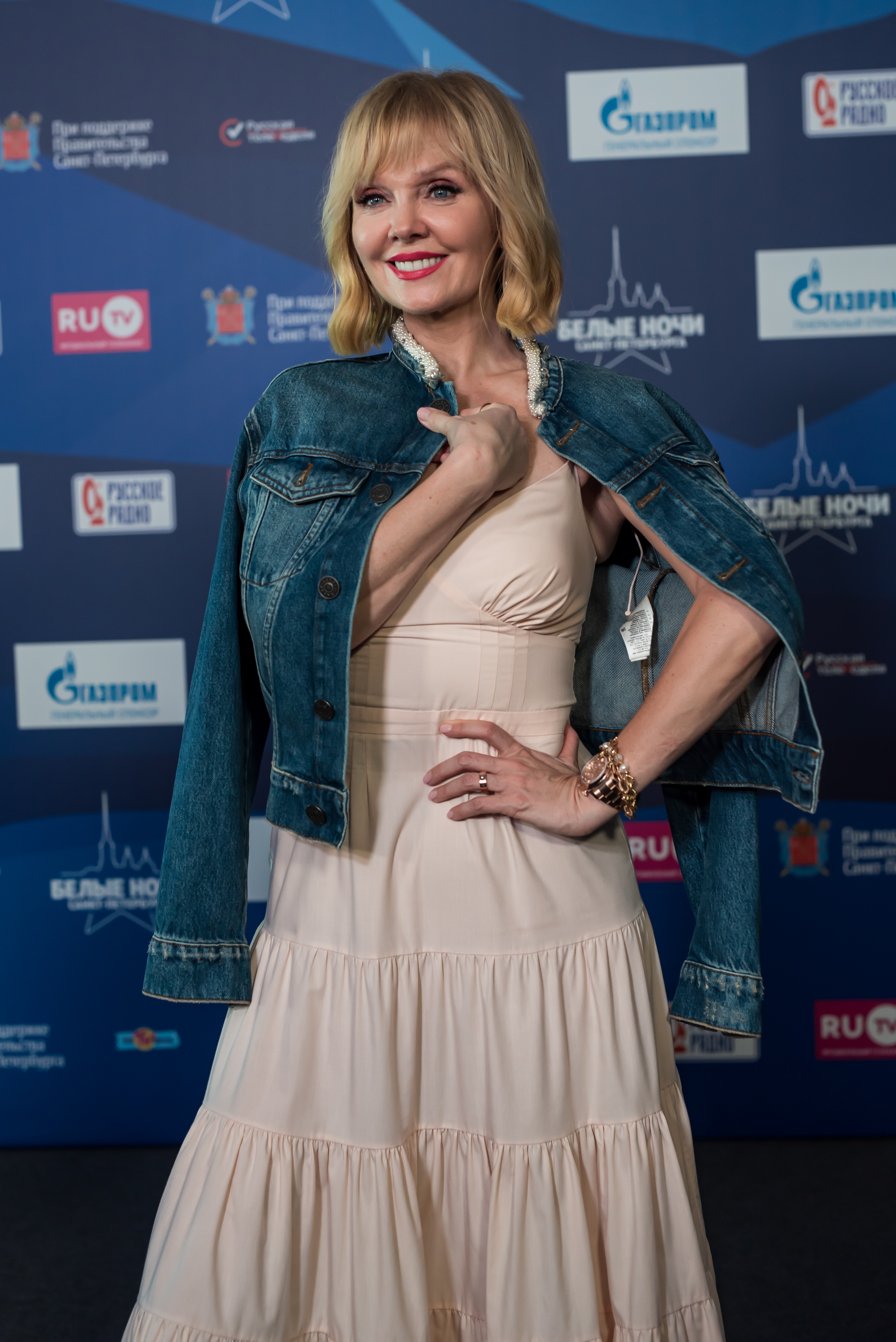
- Valeriya in 2021
- Born: Alla Yurievna Perfilova; April 17, 1968 (age 58); Atkarsk, Russian SFSR, USSR
- Education: Gnessin State Musical College
- Occupations: Singer; model
- Years active: 1989–present
- Height: 1.72 m (5 ft 8 in)
- Title: People's Artist of Russia (2013)
- Children: 3
- Musical career
- Genre: Pop
- Instrument: Singing
- Website: www.valeriya.ru

Alla Yurievna Perfilova (Russian: Алла Юрьевна Перфилова; born April 17, 1968), known by her stage name Valeriya (Russian: Валерия), is a Russian singer and fashion model. A recipient of the titles People's Artist of Russia (2013) and People's Artist of the Pridnestrovian Moldavian Republic (2016), she has also won numerous awards, including Golden Gramophone (thirteen), Pesnya goda (thirteen), Muz-TV (four: Best Performer in 2004, 2010 and 2015, Best Video, 2014), and MTV Russia Music Awards (two, Best Performer, 2004, Best Song, 2005). She has been a member of the Council for Culture and Art under the President of the Russian Federation since 2012.

== Biography ==
Valeriya was born on April 17, 1968, in a town of Atkarsk in the Saratov Oblast.

=== Career ===
In 1985 Valeriya enrolled in the Gnessin State Musical College in Moscow which she graduated 1990.

In 1989 Valeriya recorded two albums. Her first English-language disc, The Taiga Symphony came out in 1991 via Shulgin Records. Pobud' so mnoi (Stay with me), a collection of traditional Russian romances, was released by Lad Records a year later. In 1992 she won the first prize in a national TV contest Morning Star. Also that year she won the international contest Bratislavskaya Lira and received an Audience Choice Award at Yurmala-92.

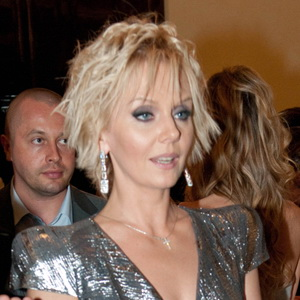
At the Ritz-Carlton Top Beauty Awards 2010

In 2005 Valeriya was awarded the Honoured Artiste of Russia title and ranked 9th in the Forbes magazine list of 50 most highly paid people in movie, sport, literature and music industry.

In March 2009 Valeriya was invited to join as a special guest Simply Red's "The Greatest Hits" Tour in the UK. She also took part in the Russian National Final for Eurovision 2009 with the song "Back to Love" and later finished second behind "Mamo" by Anastasia Prikhodko. In 2010, Valeriya joined forces with Avon as a celebrity judge for Avon Voices, Avon's first ever global, online singing talent search for women and songwriting competition for men and women.

Valeria's 2013 studio album Po serpantinu featured four duets (with Valery Meladze, Nikolai Baskov, Alexander Buynov and, notably, Goran Bregovich, one of her all-time favourite artists). Most of the reviews, though, centered on the Russian chanson-tinged title track and "I Will Be Waiting for You", the latter included into the comedy Polar Flight soundtrack. It was followed by the Best Of compilation Eto vremya lyubvi (This Is the Time of Love), which included "Ty moya" (You Are Mine), the duet with her daughter Anna Shulgina.

Valeriya's 2016 studio album Okeany served well to "prove the singer's intention to remain a 'a healthy man's perfect female singer'," but her "'formula of happiness' here is here being pronounced with the strictness of a harsh pedagogue," according to critic Alexey Mazhayev. The material for her 2017 studio album K solntsu (Towards the Sun) has been provided by the team of young, unknown songwriters, including Cyrill Yermakov from Belarus, "but if the idea was to bring in the feeling of freshness, it succeeded only in fragments," according to Mazhayev. Highly successful though proved to be the singles "Minor Infarctions" and "The Heart Is Broken".

== Views and public statements ==
Public activities and statements of the singer have triggered and still trigger mixed, at times even strident response in the neighboring (to Russia) countries.

On 6 February 2012, Valeria was officially registered as an authorized representative of Vladimir Putin, a candidate for President of the Russian Federation, in his campaign for a third term. She later described her attitude toward the government as follows: "I am a person with an established civic position, and I am convinced that there is currently no one in Russia who could perform the duties of president better than V. V. Putin. And those who believe that I was bought or persuaded are wrong."

In the summer of 2012, she spoke in favor of punishing the members of Pussy Riot for their protest at the Cathedral of Christ the Saviour: "...the punishment should be substantial, not merely a fine that their supporters, for whom it is pocket change, will readily pay, but something that will deter others from doing the same." She called the women "street hooligans" and said that she was outraged by their actions. Valeria also expressed a negative view of the support for Pussy Riot shown by international celebrities.

While promoting her English-language album Out of Control in 2008, Valeria appeared in a video with the slogan "I Love Pink News" for the British LGBT news website of the same name. However, in a subsequent interview with the publication, she stated that she did not want to be a "gay icon" and knew nothing about the problems faced by gay people in Russia, including the prohibition of LGBT rights demonstrations in Moscow.

In December 2012, together with other figures from show business and sports, she signed a letter addressed to the President and Prime Minister of Russia calling for the early termination of the mandate of Vitaly Milonov, a deputy of the Legislative Assembly of Saint Petersburg known for a number of controversial initiatives.

In June 2013, the singer supported the adoption of the law banning so-called "propaganda of non-traditional sexual relations" and described homosexuality as a "biologically unjustified orientation".

In March 2014, the Russian Ministry of Culture published on its website a document entitled "Cultural Figures of Russia — in Support of the President's Position on Ukraine and Crimea". Valeria and Iosif Prigozhin were among the listed signatories. In August 2016, Prigozhin denied that either he or his wife had signed any document on the subject, stating, "we did not support any aggression or any annexations". According to him, they had only been asked orally about their attitude toward the referendum.

In 2018, Valeria served as an authorized representative of Moscow mayoral candidate Sergei Sobyanin. In the same year, she served as an authorized representative of Vladimir Putin during his campaign for a fourth presidential term.

On 18 March 2022, she performed at the Yubileyny Sports Palace at a rally-concert marking the anniversary of the annexation of Crimea.

=== Sanctions ===
In July 2014, Valeria, along with Iosif Kobzon and Oleg Gazmanov, was placed on the blacklist of the Latvian Ministry of Foreign Affairs because they had "aggressively supported the annexation of Crimea" and had spoken disrespectfully about the actions of the Ukrainian authorities.

In November 2014, Valeria wrote a letter in Latvian to Latvian President Andris Bērziņš asking him to assess the actions of Foreign Minister Edgars Rinkēvičs and to overturn the decision barring her from entering the country. Ukrainian activists accused Valeria and Kobzon of "openly supporting terrorist organizations — the 'DPR' and 'LPR' — whose leaders are subject to European Union sanctions". On 1 December, Bērziņš responded to the letter, stating that if the minister changed his decision, the president could shorten or revoke the existing ban.

On 7 January 2023, amid the Russian invasion of Ukraine, Valeria was added to Ukraine's sanctions list for her "role in Russian propaganda".

On 20 July 2023, she was added to Canada's sanctions list targeting "persons who use their art to promote Russia's invasion of Ukraine".

She was also included by the Anti-Corruption Foundation on its list of "corrupt officials and warmongers" for participating in concerts supporting the war against Ukraine.

== Personal life ==
Valeriya has been married three times. Her first husband was Leonid Yaroshevsky, her second husband was Alexandr Shulgin. She is currently married to Iosif Prigozhin. Valeriya lives in Moscow.

== Discography ==
=== Studio albums ===
- 1992 — Pobud' so Mnoi (Stay With Me)
- 1992 — The Taiga Symphony
- 1995 — Anna
- 1997 — Familia. Chast' 1 (Family Name. Part 1)
- 2000 — Perviy Internet Albom (First Internet Album)
- 2001 — Glaza Tsveta Neba (Eyes the Colour Of Heaven)
- 2003 — Strana Lyubvi (Loveland)
- 2006 — Nezhnost' Moya (My Tenderness)
- 2008 — Nepodkontrolno (Out Of Control, also the title of this album's English version)
- 2010 — Vo Mne Moya Lubov' (My Love Inside Me)
- 2013 — Po serpantinu (Upon the Serpentine)
- 2016 — Okeany (Oceans)
- 2017 — K Solntsu (Towards the Sun)
- 2025 — Iscelyu (I will heal)

=== Compilation albums ===
- 1999 — Samoye Luchsheye (The Very Best)
- 2010 — Pesni, Kotorye Vy Polyubili (The Songs You've Come to Love)

=== Singles ===
- "The Sky Belongs to Me" 1992
- "Stay With Me" 1992
- "My Moscow" 1995
- "S dobrim Utrom!" ("Good Morning!" 1995)
- "Moskva slezam ne verit" (Moscow Does Not Believe in Tears, 1995)
- "Samolet" (Airplaine, 1995)
- "Obichnie Dela" (Business as Usual, 1995)
- "Noch nezhna" (Tender Is the Night, 1997)
- "Popolam" (In Halves, 1997)
- "O tom chto bilo" (Of What Has Been, 1997}
- "Jal" (Sorry, 1997)
- "Ty gde to tam" (You're Somewhere Else, 1999)
- "Tsvety" (Flowers, 1999)
- "Snowstorm" 2000
- "Riga - Moscow" 2000
- "Taju" (I'm melting, 2000)
- "Ne obijay menya" (Don't Put Me Down, 2001)
- "Ne obmanyvai" (Don't Lie, 2001)
- "Bolshe chem zhizn" (Larger Than Life, 2001
- "Malchiki ne plachyt" (Boys Don't Cry, 2001)
- "Bila lubov" (There Was Love, 2003)
- "Chasiki" (Small Watch, 2003)
- "Pereley voda" (Running Waters, 2003)
- "Raduga duga" (Rainbow, 2003)
- "Cherno Beliy Tsvet" (Black and White, 2003)
- "Obo mne ne vspominay" (Forget About Me, 2003)
- "Ti grustish" (You're Sad, duet with Stas Pjekha, 2004)
- "Otpusty menya" (Let Me Go, 2006)
- "Prosto tak" (Just So, 2006)
- "Malenkiy samolet" (Little Airplane, 2006)
- "Ot razluky do lubvi" (From Parting to Love, 2006)
- "Ty poimesh" (You'll Understand, 2006)
- "Nejnost moya" (My Tenderness, 2006)
- "Rasstavanie" (The Parting, with Stas Pjekha 2006)
- "Break It All" (2007)
- "Mi vmeste" (We Are Together, 2008)
- "Chelovek dozhdya" (The Rain Man, 2008)
- "The Party's Over" (2008)
- "Wild" (2008)
- "Stayin' Alive" (Valeriya and Robin Gibb, 2008)
- "Nikto kak ty" (Nobody But You, 2009)
- "Back to Love" (2009)
- "All That I Want" (2010)
- "Zhdi menya" (Wait for Me, 2010)
- "Until You Love You" (2011)
- "Podruga" (Girl Friend, 2011)
- "Sokhraniv ljubov" (Keeping the Love Alive", 2011, with Nikolai Baskov)
- "Ya tebya otpustila" (I've Let You Go, 2011)
- "Po serpantiny" (Over the Serpantine, 2012)
- "Ya budu zhdat tebya" (I Will Be Waiting for You, 2012)
- "Ne teryai menya" (Don't Lose Me, 2013, with Valery Meladze)
- "Moi lyubimy" (My Beloved, 2014)
- "Serdtse iz stekla" (Heart of Glass, 2014, with Ruslan Alekhno)
- "Eto vremya lyubvi" (This Is the Time of Love, 2014)
- "Ty moya" (You Are Mine, 2014, with daughter Anna Shulgina)
- "Zabyvai menya" (Start to Forget Me, 2015)
- "Formula stchastya" (Formula of Happiness, 2015)
- "Silnyie zhenshchiny" (Strong Women, 2015)
- "Telo khochet lyubvi" (The Body Wants Love, 2016)
- "Okeany" (Oceans, 2016)
- "Lyubov ne prodayotsya" (Love Is Not for Sale, 2016, with Kristina Orbakaite)
- "Za minutu do snega" (A Minute Before the Snowfall, 2016, with Oleg Gazmanov)
- "Mikroinfarkty" (Minor Infarctions, 2017)
- "Svet moyikh glaz" (Light of My Eyes, 2017)
- "Serdtse razorvano" (The Heart Is Broken, 2017)

== Books ==
- 2006 — Tears and Love (autobiography, Azbuka-klassika, ISBN 5-91181-135-9)
- 2010 — Yoga with Valeriya (self-help, Eksmo, ISBN 978-5-699-49341-8)

== Awards ==
=== State awards ===
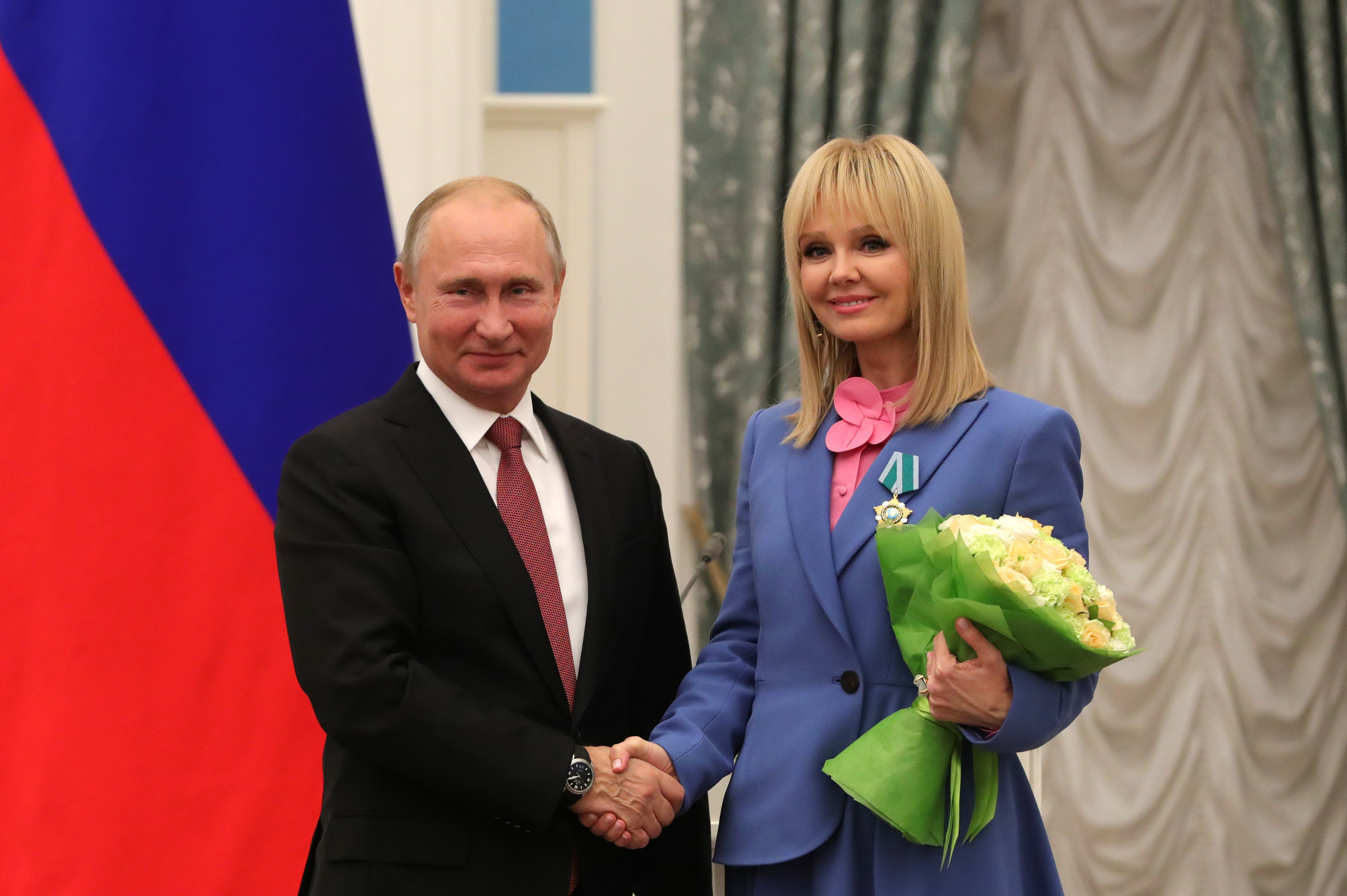
Valeriya receives the Order of Friendship from President Putin in Kremlin on 27 November 2018

- 2003 — The Order "For the Revival of Russia"
- 2005 — The title Merited Artist of the Russian Federation
- 2013 — The title People's Artist of Russia (2013)
- 2018 — Order of Friendship

=== Music awards ===
- 1992 — Morning Star TV contest, winner
- 1992 — International contest Bratislavskaya Lira, winner
- 1992 — Jurmala-92, Audience Choice Award
- 1993 — Russian Union of Journalists, Person of the Year
- 1994 — Song of the Year TV Festival, laureate, with "Business as Usual"
- 1995 — Song of the Year TV Festival, laureate, with "Airplane"
- 2000 — Hit-FM Award, "Metelitsa"
- 2000 — Song of the Year TV Festival, laureate, "Riga-Moscow"
- 2000 — Golden Gramophone national prize for "Riga-Moscow"
- 2001 — Alexander Popov Professional National Prize, Radio Favorite of the Year
- 2001 — Record- 2001, "Riga-Moscow"
- 2001 — Song of the Year TV Festival, laureate with "I Am Melting". Also: Klavdiya Shulzhenko Prize, Singer of the Year
- 2003 — 7 Days magazine Awards, Best Female Act, Best Looking Female Act
- 2003 — Golden Gramophone, for "Chasiki" (Small Watch), Song of the Year
- 2003 — Song of the Year TV Festival, with "Chasiki"
- 2003 — Business People 2003 contest, laureate
- 2004 — Muz-TV Awards 2004, Best Female Act
- 2004 — MTV Russia Music Awards 2004, Best Female Act
- 2004 — Record 2004, Radio Hit of the Year, "Chasiki"
- 2004 — Golden Gramophone, "Black and White"
- 2005 — MTV Russia Music Awards, Best Duet, "You Are Sad", with Stas Piekha
- 2005 — Golden Gramophone, for "You Are Sad"
- 2006 — "Golden Gramophone", Brilliant voice of Russia, for "My Tenderness"
- 2007 — Record 2007, Radio Hit of the Year, for "My Tenderness"
- 2007 — Song of the Year TV Festival, laureate, with "We Are Together"
- 2007 — Golden Gramophone for "We Are Together"
- 2007 — Olympia Prize (from the Russian Association of Businesswomen)
- 2008 — Golden Gramophone for "The Rain Man"
- 2008 — The Ovation Award, the Best Vocalist
- 2008 — ZD Awards, Best Artist, Best Video
- 2008 — Olympia Prize, from the Russian Association of Businesswomen
- 2008 — Song of the Year TV Festival, laureate, with "The Rain Man"
- 2009 — ZD Awards, Best Female Act, Best Video
- 2009 — Golden Gramophone for "Nobody Like You"
- 2009 — Song of the Year TV Festival, Klavdia Shulzhenko Prize, Singer of the Year
- 2010 — Muz-TV Awards 2010, Best Female Act
- 2010 — ZD Awards, Best Artist
- 2011 — Golden Gramophone for "Bird of the Parting"
- 2011 — Song of the Year TV Festival, Best Duet, "Keeping the Love", with Nikolai Baskov
- 2012 — Song of the Year TV Festival, "I've Let You Go", with Igor Krutoi
- 2012 — Stars of the Road Radio, laureate
- 2012 — RU.TV, Best Duet, "Keeping the Love", with Nikolai Baskov
- 2013 — Song of the Year TV Festival, for "Do Not Lose Me", with Valery Meladze
- 2014 — Muz-TV Awards 2014, Best Video for "Do Not Lose Me", with Valery Meladze
- 2014 — Golden Gramophone for "We Are Afraid to Love"
- 2014 — Song of the Year TV Festival, with "Time to Love"
- 2014 — Stars of the Road Radio, laureate
- 2015 — Muz-TV Awards 2015, Best Artist of the decade
- 2015 — Muz-TV Awards 2015, Best Duet, for "You Are Mine" with Anna Shulgina
- 2015 — MUSICBOX-2015, Best Duet, for "You Are Mine" with Anna Shulgina
- 2015 — First Russian National Music Prize, for "I've Let You Go"
- 2015 — Golden Gramophone Jubilee, for "Riga-Moscow"
- 2015 — RU.TV, Best Dance Track for "This Is the Time of Love"
- 2015 — Song of the Year TV Festival, laureate, with "The Formula of Happiness"
- 2016 — Stars of the Road Radio, laureate
- 2016 — Song of the Year TV Festival, laureate, with "Oceans"
- 2016 — Fashion Summer Awards, the Stylish Female Act
- 2016 — Fashion People Awards, Artist of the Year
- 2016 — MUSICBOX-2017, Best Duet, "Love Is Not for Sale", with Kristina Orbakaitė
- 2016 — Chanson of the Year, for "He and She", with Alexey Glyzin
- 2018 — Zhara Music Award, Collaboration of the Year, "Chasiki" with Egor Kreed
