= Yevgeniy Martynov =

Soviet composer (1948–1990)

- Born: Yevgeniy Grigorievich Martynov; May 22, 1948; Kamyshin, Stalingrad Oblast, RSFSR, USSR (now Russia)
- Died: September 3, 1990 (aged 42); Moscow, USSR
- Occupations: composer, singer
- Spouse: Evelina Starenchenko
- Awards: Lenin Komsomol Prize (1987)

Yevgeniy Grigorievich Martynov (Russian: Евге́ний Григо́рьевич Марты́нов; May 22, 1948 – September 3, 1990) was a Soviet pop singer and composer, the older brother of the composer Yuri Martynov.

== Biography ==
Martynov was born on May 22, 1948, in Kamyshin (now in Russia's Volgograd Oblast). His father was the commander of an infantry platoon, and was wounded during World War II, his mother was a nurse. The family moved to the Donbas region (Martynov's father's homeland), and settled in Artyomovsk. Yevgeniy displayed a musical talent since an early age. His father taught him to play the accordion.

Martynov graduated from local music school as a clarinet player. In 1967 he was accepted to the Kiev Conservatory, but was soon transferred to the Donetsk Music and Pedagogical Institute (now the Prokofiev Conservatory), from which he graduated early in 1971. In 1972, while working as a composer in Moscow, he met Maya Kristalinskaya, from whom he composed the song "Birch" to Sergey Yesenin's lyrics. Later that year, his song "My Love" was performed by Gyulli Chokheli. Martynov lived in Moscow and worked first at the State Concert Association as a vocalist, and then at the publishing houses "Young Guard" and "Pravda" as a musical editor-consultant. In 1978 he played the role of a romance singer in Oleg Biyma's musical Just a Fairy Tale....

Yevgeniy Martynov was a member of the Union of Soviet Composers since 1984. In his work, Martynov used the most successful lyrical or civic poems by Ilya Reznik, Andrey Dementyev, Robert Rozhdestvensky, Mikhail Plyatskovsky and other outstanding Soviet poets. Martynov's songs were performed by prominent Soviet singers of the 1970s and 1980s, such as Sofia Rotaru, Iosif Kobzon, Anna German, Vadim Mulerman, Aleksander Serov, Georgy Minasyan, Maria Codreanu, Mikhail Chuev, Eduard Khil and others. After Martynov's death, some of his songs were sung and recorded by Yulian, Nikolai Baskov, Philipp Kirkorov, Ani Lorak, and Tina Karol, among others.

== Death ==
Yevgeniy Martynov died on September 3, 1990. The official cause of death is acute heart failure. He was buried at the Kuntsevo Cemetery in Moscow. Shortly before his death, on August 27, 1990, he had performed for the last time .

== Personal life ==
Martynov had a wife Evelina, whom he married in 1978. Together they had a son Sergei (named after Rachmaninoff and Yesenin).

== Awards ==
- Laureate of the 10th World Festival of Youth and Students, Berlin (1973)
- Second prize winner of the Golden Orpheus contest (1976)
- Lenin Komsomol Prize (1987) for creation of works for children and youths, and work on the aesthetic education of youths

== Popular songs ==
- The Loyalty of Swans
- A Ballad about Mother
- Apple Тrees in Blossom
- Alyonushka
- Cherry
- Father's Letter
- The Curse
