= Jurmala Young Pop Singer Competition =

Music competition held in Latvia

The Jurmala Young Pop Singer Competition (Latvian: Jauno dziedātāju konkurss „Jūrmala”, Russian: конкурс молодых исполнителей эстрадной песни "Юрмала"), has been held almost annually during 1986-1993 in the resort city of Jūrmala, Latvia. Each year the chairman of the jury was the initiator of the festival, Raimonds Pauls. Another founder and host (until 1992) was Yuri Nikolaev.

Since 1992: Jurmala Television Pop Music Festival (Latvian: Starptautiskais popmūzikas festivāls)

== 1986 ==
- Grand Prix: Rodrigo Fomins (Igo); songs: "Путь к свету", "Грибной дождь" and "Kā senā dziesmā"
- 1st prize: Narine Arutyunyan
- 2nd prize: Valentina Legkostupova; songs, "Берег счастья" and "Пускай метель"
- 3rd prize: Svetlana Medyanik & Ais Buluktaeva

== 1987 ==
- Grand Prix: (was not awarded)
- 1st prize: Kare Kauks
- 2nd prize: Olga Rajecka & Uģis Roze
- 3rd prize: Larisa Konoshchuk & Valery Karimov
- Spectators' Prize: Alla Perfilova; jazz-rock song by Natalya Maslova arranged by Leonid Yaroshevsky

== 1988 ==
- Grand Prix: Aleksandr Malinin; songs: "Коррида", "Напрасные слова", "Осторожно, двери закрываются"
- 1st prize: Erich Krieger
- 2nd prize: The competition this year had a political resonance when the Latvian pop-rock singer Zigfrīds Muktupāvels performed the patriotic song "Tautas laiks" ("People's Time") written by Imants Ziedonis.
- 3rd prize: Kastytis Kerbedis & Aziza Mukhamedova

== 1989 ==
- Grand Prix: Soso Pavliashvili
- 1st prize: Angelina Petrosova
- 2nd prize: Eugene Kulikov
- 3rd prize: Ivo Fomins
- Spectators' Award: Ivo Fomins

== 1992 ==
The competition was held July 21–25 in the Tennis Center "Lielupe". The organizers were Raimonds Pauls, Igor Nikolayev and Vadim Makarenko. This year it was announced as an International Television Festival and rules were changed: the number of contestants was limited to 15, the age was limited to 25, and the languages were limited to English and Latvian. Russian was excluded for political reasons due to the escalated conflict with Russia. For the latter reason Nikolayev was rejected as a host.

- Grand Prix: Arina (Arina Borunova)
- Third prize: Maxim Fadeev

A 105' documentary Jurmala-92 was released.

== See also ==
- New Wave (competition)
