= Andrey Dementyev (poet) =

Russian writer (1928–2018)

- Андрей Дементьев
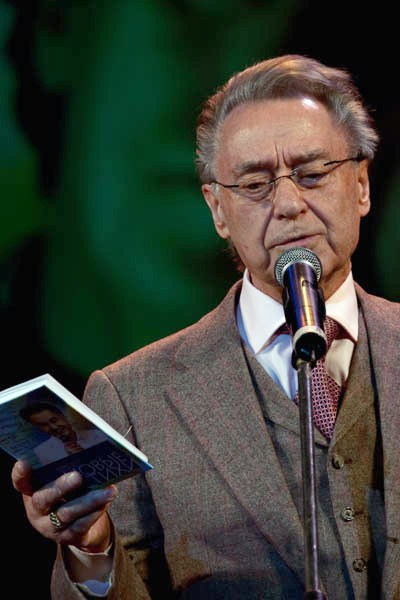
- Dementyev in 2008
- Born: Andrey Dmitriyevich Dementyev; 16 July 1928; Tver, RSFSR, Soviet Union
- Died: 26 June 2018 (aged 89); Moscow, Russia
- Citizenship: Soviet, Russian
- Education: Tver State University; Maxim Gorky Literature Institute
- Occupations: Poet, writer
- Years active: 1948—2018

Andrey Dmitriyevich Dementyev (Russian: Андре́й Дми́триевич Деме́нтьев, IPA: [ɐnˈdrʲej ˈdmʲitrʲɪjɪvʲɪdʑ dʲɪˈmʲenʲtʲjɪf]; July 16, 1928 – June 26, 2018) was a Soviet and Russian poet, a laureate of Lenin Komsomol Prize (1981), a USSR State Prize (1985), and Bunin Prize (2007).

Dementyev was considered one of the outstanding Russian and Soviet poets of the late 20th century. The range of his works is rich. It includes a novel about Mikhail Kalinin (August from Revel, 1970), as well as lyrics of many popular songs of the Soviet epoch (Alyonushka, Swans’ Fidelity, Father's Home, A Ballade about the Mother, etc.) which were performed by Yevgeniy Martynov.

In October 1993, the poet's signature appeared under the Letter of Forty-Two. In September 2012, Dementyev announced that he had not signed the letter.

In Dementyev's works the ideals of romanticism, humanism, and compassion are asserted. The characteristic of his poems is a sharp feeling of patriotism, rejection of the negative traits of the present, bitter irony, lyricism, optimism, enjoying simple things, loving the nature.

Andrey Dementyev died in Moscow shortly before his 90th birthday. His grandson is Russian actor Andrei Dementyev.
