= Tatiana Bulanova =

Russian singer (born 1969)

Tatyana Bulanova Татьяна Буланова
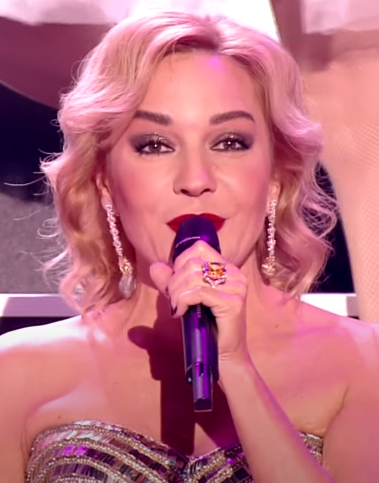
- Bulanova in 2016
- Born: Tatyana Ivanovna Bulanova; 6 March 1969 (age 57); Leningrad, RSFSR, USSR
- Other names: Tanya Bulanova; TaBu
- Occupation: Singer
- Years active: 1990–present
- Title: Merited Artist of Russia (2004)
- Awards: Ovation; Pesnya goda; Golden Gramophone; Shanson goda
- Musical career
- Genres: Pop; synth-pop; disco; alt-rock; dance pop; Russian romance
- Instruments: Vocals; guitar; piano
- Labels: Soyuz; Iceberg Music; ARS; Kvadro Disk; Bomba-Piter; United Music Group
- Formerly of: Letny sad (1990–1994)
- Website: www.bulanova.com

Tatyana Ivanovna Rudneva (Russian: Татьяна Ивановна Руднева; née Bulanova (Буланова); born 6 March 1969 in Leningrad, Soviet Union) is a Russian singer recognized for her strong, melancholic romance ballads, catchy electro-pop beats and techno remixes. She shot to fame in 1990 when she started her singing career with the band Letniy sad (Russian: Летний сад). Tatyana and Letniy sad had 10 hit albums together between 1990 and 1996. Since 1996, she has maintained her popularity and released a further 18 hit solo albums. She was named a Meritorious Artist of Russia (2004).

After her marriage to Russian football player, Vladislav Radimov (Russian: Владислав Радимов), she took some time to focus on her family, typically performing in the "All-Stars" shows instead of solo concerts. Bulanova and Radimov divorced in 2016. They have one son, Nikita. This was Bulanova's second marriage. In June 2023, she married former tennis player Valery Rudnev.

== Public position ==
In the 2021 State Duma election, Bulanova was placed among the top three candidates on the federal party list of the Rodina party. She was also registered as a candidate for the Legislative Assembly of Saint Petersburg in single-member constituency No. 19, which included Petrodvortsovy District, the Gorelovo and Krasnoye Selo municipal districts of Krasnoselsky District, and parts of Konstantinovskoye.

In the summer of 2022, Bulanova appeared in the music video Russia Is Us! and criticized Maxim Galkin and Andrey Makarevich for leaving Russia. She also expressed support for Russia's military actions against Ukraine.

== Discography ==
Studio albums featuring Letny sad

- 25 gvozdik (1990)
- Ne plach (1991)
- Starshaya sestra (1992)
- Strannaya vstrecha (1993)
- Izmena (1994)

Solo studio albums

- Obratniy bilet (1996)
- Moyo russkoe serdtse (1996)
- Sterpitsya – slyubitsya (1997)
- Zhenskoye serdtse (1998)
- Staya (1999)
- Moy son (featuring DJ Tsvetkоff; 2000)
- Den rozhdeniya (2001)
- Zoloto lyubvi (2001)
- Krasnoye na belom (2002)
- Eto igra (2002)
- Lyubov (2003)
- Belaya cheryomukha (2004)
- Letela dusha (2005)
- Lyublyu i skuchayu (2007)
- Romansy (2010)
- Eto ya (2017)
- Yedinstvenny dom (2020)
- Tanya, dyshi! (2023)
