= Aziza (singer) =

Uzbek-Russian singer-songwriter (born 1964)

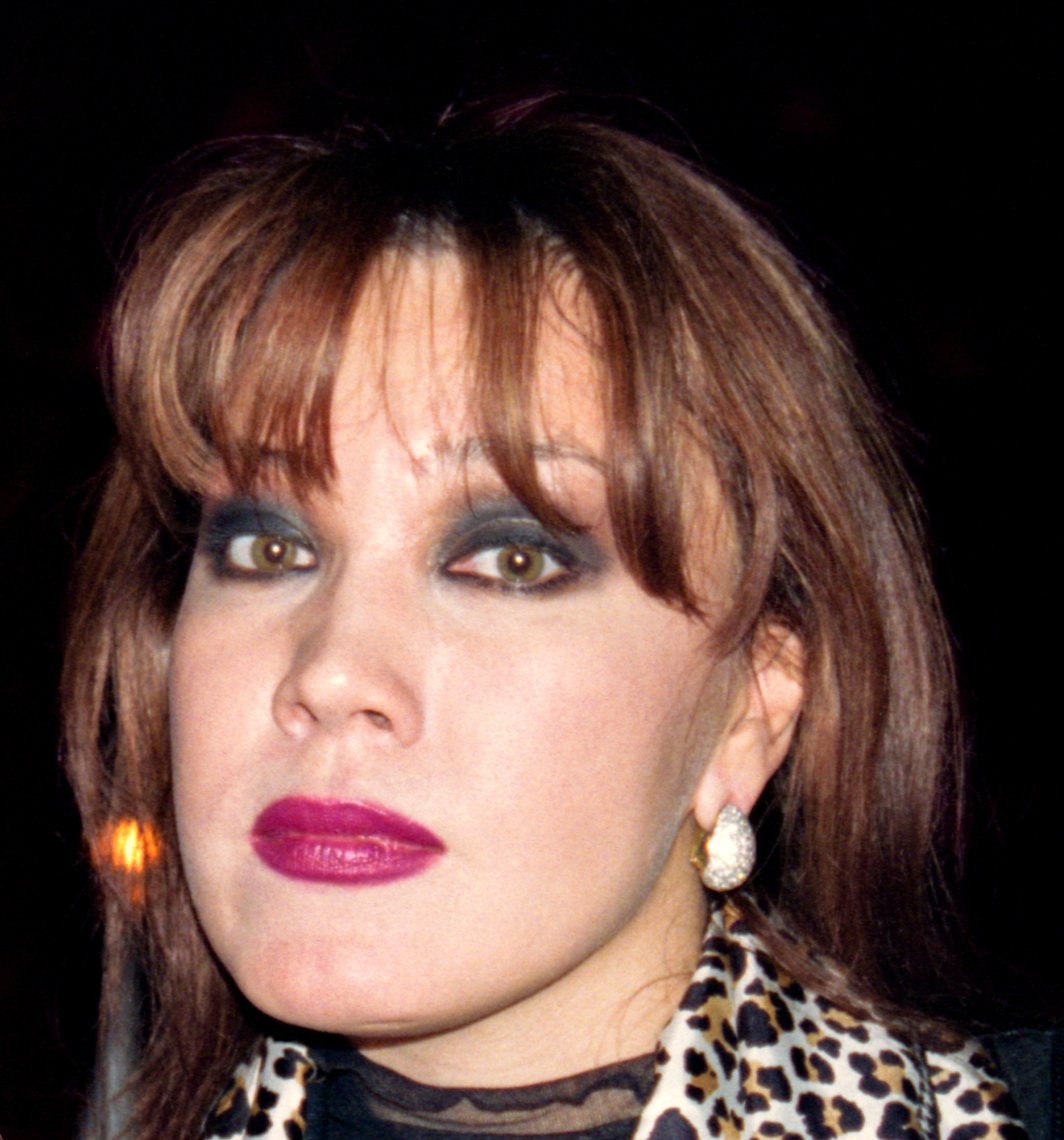
- Aziza in 1997
- Born: Aziza Abdurahimovna Muhamedova; 10 April 1964 (age 62); Tashkent, Uzbek SSR, USSR
- Occupation: Singer-songwriter
- Years active: 1980–present
- Musical career
- Genres: Pop; folk; rock; Russian chanson
- Instrument: Vocals
- Formerly of: Sado (1980–1988)
- Website: www.aziza.info

Aziza Abdurakhimovna Mukhamedova (Uzbek: Aziza Abdurahimovna Muhamedova, Азиза Абдураҳимовна Муҳамедова; Russian: Азиза Абдурахимовна Мухамедова; born 10 April 1964), known mononymously as Aziza, is an Uzbek–Russian singer-songwriter.

== Biography ==
=== Early years ===
Aziza Mukhamedova was born on 10 April 1964 in Tashkent, the capital of the Uzbek SSR, in a family of professional musicians. Her father, Abdurakhim Mukhamedov (1923–1980), composer, Honored Artist of the Uzbek SSR (1975), veteran of the Great Patriotic War, half Uzbek and half Uyghur, came from a family of hereditary bakers. He died when Aziza was sixteen years old. Her mother, Rafika Akhmetshevna Mukhamedova (Haidarova; 1924–2015), was Tatar and originally from the village of Staraya Kulatka, Ulyanovsk Oblast, she was a soloist of the State Academic Choral Chapel of the Uzbek SSR, taught at a music school, worked as a conductor. Aziza is the youngest of three sisters.

At the age of sixteen, Aziza began performing as a soloist in the Tashkent vocal and instrumental ensemble Sado.

In 1988, after graduating from the Tashkent Conservatory, the singer was sent to the third All-Union television competition of young performers of Soviet pop songs in Jūrmala (Latvian SSR), at which she did not take the prize, but was awarded the audience award.

=== Career ===
In 1989, Aziza moved from Tashkent to Moscow, where her solo career began. Popularity comes to her thanks to her song "Tvoya ulybka", which immediately became a hit. In the same year Aziza releases her debut album Aziza.

In 1991, at a concert in St. Petersburg, Aziza's guard Igor Malakhov fought with Igor Talkov's guards, as a result of which Talkov was killed under unclear circumstances. After that, Aziza dropped out of the musical life. The harassment of the singer began, TV channels announced a boycott of her, stopped inviting her to shoot, people from show business shunned, were not invited to events. Only Joseph Kobzon, Alla Pugacheva, Ilya Reznik and Irina Ponarovskaya supported the artist.

In 1993, with the song "Za svoyu lyubov", she reached the final of the Russian television festival "Song of the Year". In 1995 she returned to the stage with new songs, and in 1997 her new album Vsyo ili nichego was released. In 1999, the singer began a collaboration with Stas Namin. As a result, pop-rock songs with the influence of oriental music appeared in her repertoire.

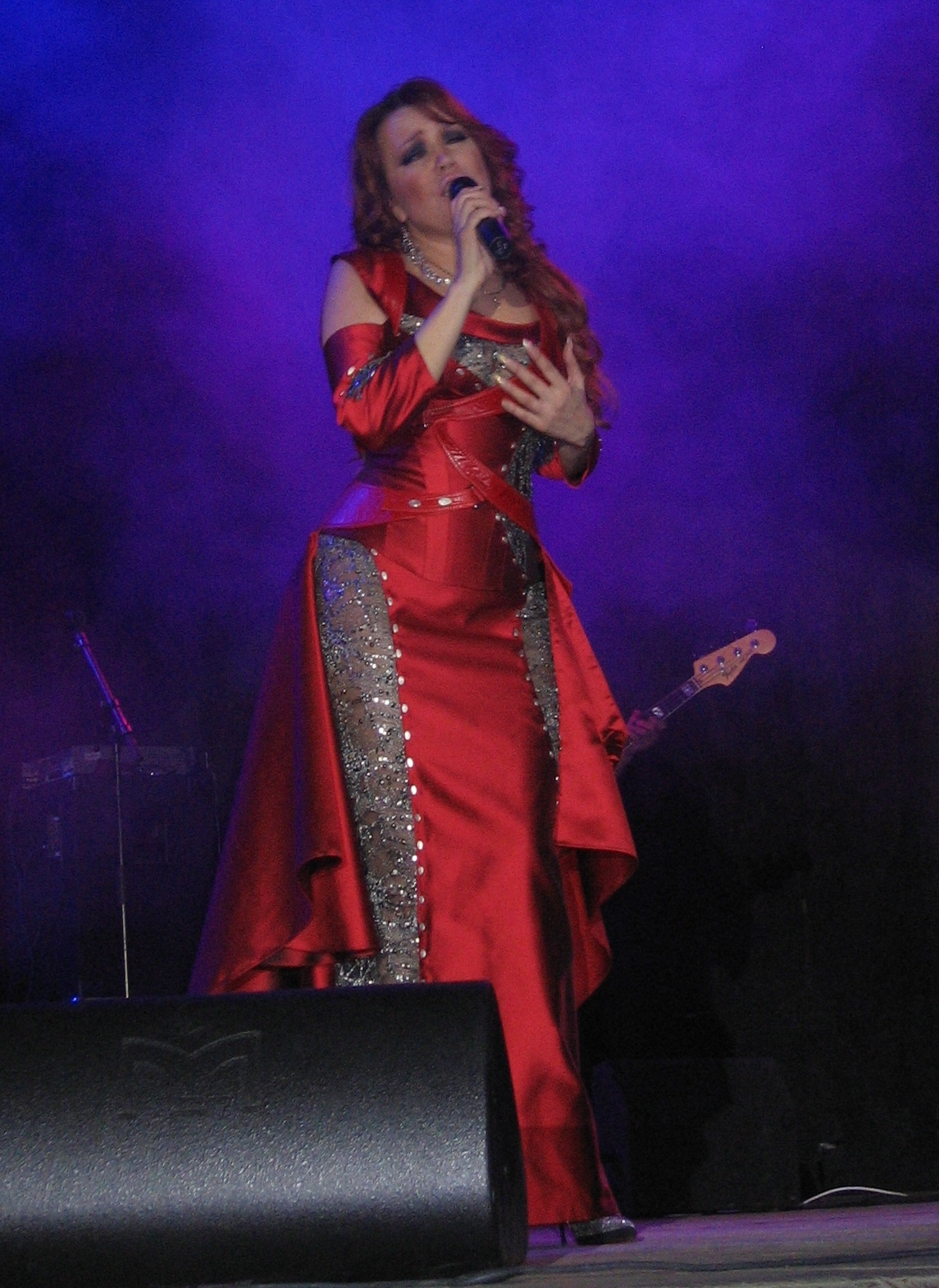
Aziza performing in 2008

In 2006, she performed the song "Etot mir" together with Igor Talkov Jr. In 2007, Aziza took part in the television music contest You are a superstar! on the NTV channel and became the absolute winner in all nominations, and in 2008 she released the album Razmyshleniye, most of the songs for which she wrote herself. The album was produced by Viacheslav Voron.

In 2015, she became the winner of the second season of the TV show reincarnation Toch-v-Toch on Channel One. On 6 October 2015, she took part in the gala concert of the 14th international competition of young performers New Wave in Sochi with the song "Proshche ne ponyat". Since September 2016, she has been a participant of the super season of the show Toch-v-toch. In 2021, she participated in the 2nd season of the show The Masked Singer as a Penguin. In the final of the fourth edition of the show, she got into the nomination for removing the mask by voting of the audience.

== Personal life ==
Igor Viktorovich Malakhov (1963—2016) was her de facto husband from 1991 to 1993. He is one of the suspects in the murder of Igor Talkov. On 6 October 1991, when the murder occurred, Aziza lost her child: Valery Shlyafman tried to hit Igor Malakhov, but got into the stomach of a pregnant Aziza.

For the first time she entered into an official marriage in 2021 with the Italian restaurateur Alessandro Lorte (born Alexander Sokolov).

The singer has no children.

In 2005, Aziza changed her religion (Islam), becoming an Orthodox Christian. Her baptismal name is Anfisa.

== Discography ==
=== Studio albums ===
- Aziza (1989)
- Vsyo ili nichego (1997)
- Cherez stolko let (2003)
- Razmyshleniye (2008)
- Po beregu shansona (2009)
- Mlecny put (2013)
- Ray nezemnoy (2014)
- My schastlivy (2019)

=== Compilations ===
- Zvyozdnaya kollektsiya (2003)
- Lyubovnoye nastroyeniye (2004)
- Duety (2019)
- Neizdannoye (2019)
- Izbrannoye (2019)
- The Best (2019)

=== Singles ===
- "Ryabina" (2020)
- "Ya khochu iskupatsya v lyubvi" (2020)
- "Lyubimyye ne umirayut" (2023)

== Awards ==
- 2023: The Leaders of the Era Award
