= Gorod 312 =

Russian-Kyrgyz music band

- Origin: Bishkek, Kyrgyzstan
- Genres: Pop, rock, pop rock, alternative rock
- Years active: 2001–present
- Labels: R-Concert, Real
- Members: Diana Makarova; Svetlana Nazarenko (Aya); Aleksander Il'ichuk; Dmitriy Pritula (Dim); Leonid Pritula (Leon); Leonid Nikonov (Nik); Mariya Ileeva (Masha)
- Past members: Igor Dzhavad-Zade; Sergey Krivopustov; Sergey Kovtun; Viktor Golovanov (Vik)
- Website: www.gorod312.ru

Gorod 312 (Russian: Город 312, "City 312") is a Russian-language band from Kyrgyzstan, formed in 2001. In the beginning of their career the band's name was "Mangra," but then they changed it to "Gorod 312." 312 is the area code of Bishkek, the city in Kyrgyzstan they came from. The band became famous in 2005, the year they released their first album 213 dorog (213 дорог, "213 roads"). The name of this album is the band's name spelled backwards.

Among other awards, Gorod 312 won two Golden Gramophone Awards for their songs.

== History ==
=== 2000s ===
In 2006, they released their next album Vne zony dostupa (Вне зоны доступа, "Out of Range"), which featured songs in alternative rock, blues, and power ballad styles.

In 2007, they released their following album Obernis' (Обернись, "Turn Back");

In 2009 and 2010, they toured in the United States, Belgium, Poland, Germany, France, and the Netherlands.

=== 2010s ===
In 2010, they filmed first in Russia 3D clip for a song "Pomogi mne" (Помоги мне, "Help Me").

=== 2020s ===
==== Political advocacy ====
The band supports the Russian invasion of Ukraine, and the Presidential Administration of Russia put it on the list of singers who were recommended to be invited to state-sponsored events.

=== 2024–present: Lineup change ===
In early 2024, founding lead vocalist Svetlana Nazarenko (Aya) paused active touring and public performances to undergo recovery following health complications from COVID-19. In March 2024, the band introduced 20-year-old singer Diana Makarova as their new lead vocalist. Makarova had gained prominence as a contestant on season 12 of Golos (the Russian edition of The Voice), competing on the team of coach Polina Gagarina. The members of Gorod 312 discovered Makarova during the show's production and invited her to join the group with Nazarenko's endorsement.

== Band Members ==
- Диана Макарова (Diana Makarova) – lead vocals (2024–present)
- Ая (Aya) – Светлана Назаренко (Svetlana Nazarenko) – lead vocals (on hiatus)
- Дим (Dim) – Дмитрий Притула (Dmitriy Pritula)
- Маша (Masha) – Мария Илеева (Mariya Ileyeva)
- Леон (Leon) – Леонид Притула (Leonid Pritula)
- Ник (Nik) – Леонид Никонов (Leonid Nikonov)
- Alex (Alex) – Александр Ильчук (Aleksander Il'ichuk)

== Discography ==
=== Albums ===
- 213 Дорог (213 Dorog) – (2005)
- Вне зоны доступа (Vne zony dostupa) – (2006)
- Обернись (Obernis') – (2007)
- Live – (2008)
- Новая музыка – (2010)

=== Singles ===
- Останусь (Ostanus')
- Вне зоны доступа (Vne Zony Dostupa)
