= Rondo (group) =

Rondo (Russian: Рондо) is a Moscow rock band formed in 1984.

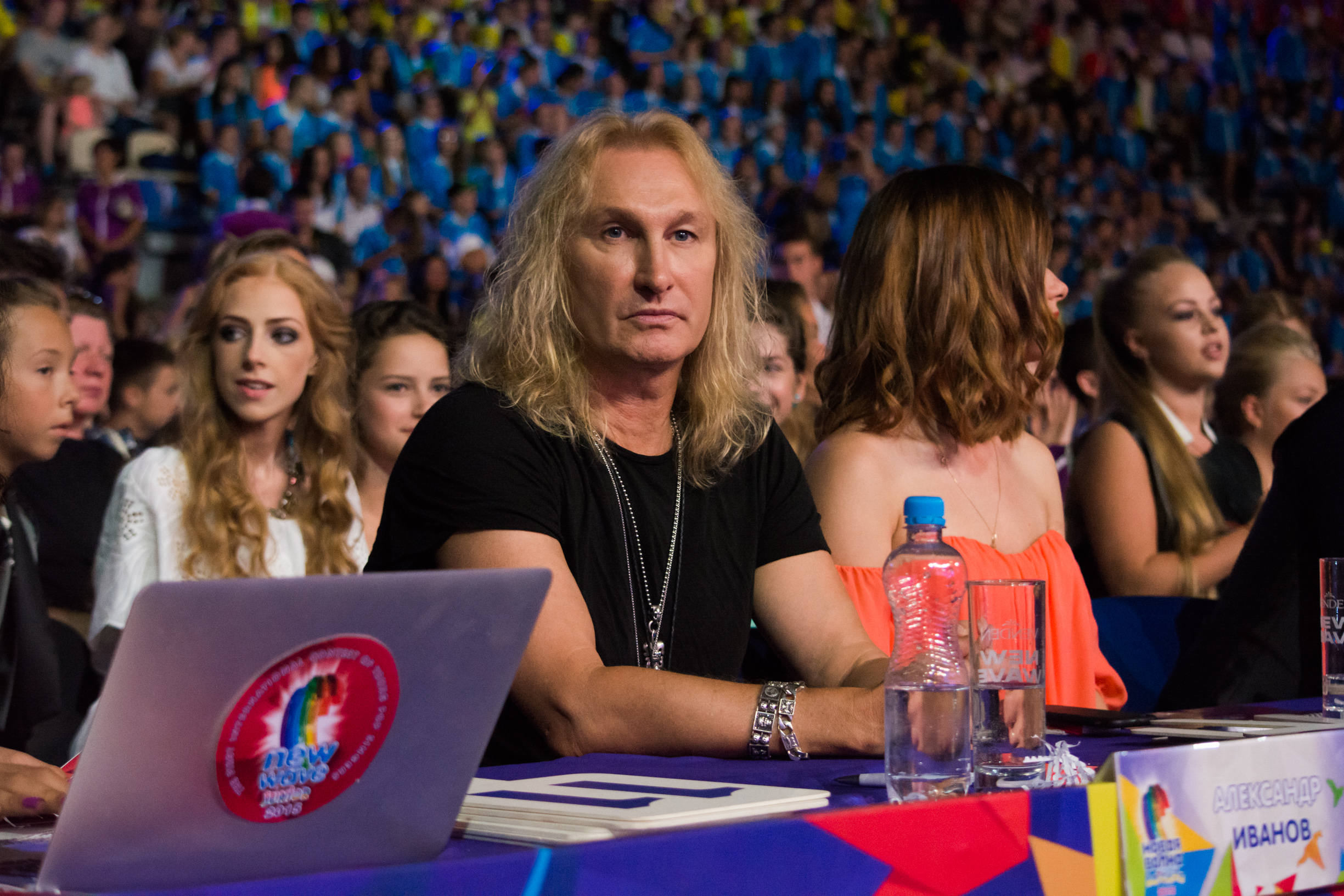
Alexander Ivanov in 2015

== History ==
The band was formed in 1984, jazz saxophonist, composer and arranger Michael Litvin, and rather quickly produced the first successful magnitoalbum Turnips. Group Rondo playing style New wave music, instrumental jazz-rock compositions. Changed several vocalists and keyboardists, while in the group does not approve, Alexander Ivanov and Yevgeny Rubanov.

In 1987, Michael Litvin dismisses the old structure and enlists new musicians. For a while the two Rondos co-exist in Moscow. In 1988, Michael Litvin emigrated to the United States, but his musicians continued to perform under the same name. In 1989, a court decision awards the rights for the name of a group to Alexander Ivanov's group.

March 27, 2003 a new album Coda was released. Same year, Ivanov officially announces the collapse of the group. Since 2005, it resumed the title Rondo.

In April and May 2022, Alexander Ivanov and Rondo participated in a series of concerts organized in order to support the 2022 Russian invasion of Ukraine.
