= Lada Dance =

Russian singer (born 1966)

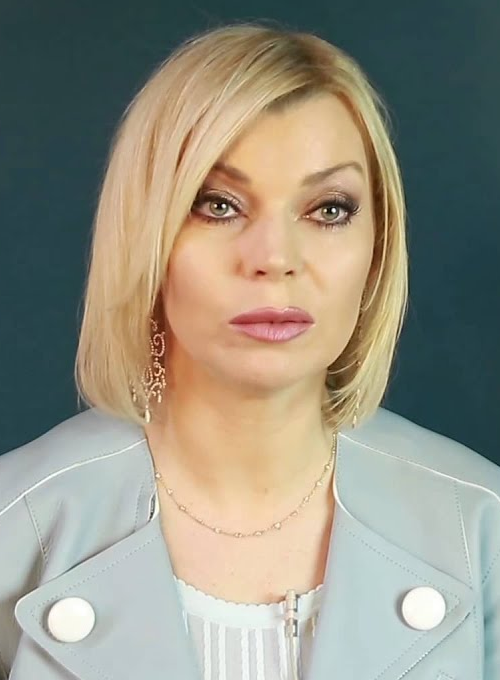
- Lada Dance in 2014
- Born: Lada Evgenyevna Volkova; 11 September 1966 (age 59); Kaliningrad, RSFSR, USSR
- Occupation: Singer
- Years active: 1988–present
- Musical career
- Genres: Pop; jazz; eurodisco
- Instrument: Vocals
- Labels: Monolit Records; Dzhem
- Formerly of: Zhensovet (1988–1990)
- Website: www.lada-dance.ru

Lada Evgenyevna Volkova (Russian: Лада Евгеньевна Волкова; born 11 September 1966), known professionally as Lada Dance (Russian: Лада Дэнс), is a Russian jazz and dance music singer.

Her popularity peaked between 1992 and 1996, after which she abandoned her career and switched to building a family. In late 1990s, she also worked as an erotic model for some time.

In 2002, she reappeared, playing one of the lead characters in a Russian TV sitcom "Balzac Age, or All Men Are Bast" (Бальзаковский возраст, или Все мужики сво...), which has been dubbed 'Russian "Sex and the City"'.

== Discography ==
=== Studio albums ===
- Nochnoy albom (1993)
- Tantsy u morya (1994)
- Vkus lyubvi (1996)
- Fantazii (with Oleg Lundstrem Orchestra; 1997)
- Na ostrovakh lyubvi (1997)
- Kogda sady tsvetut (2001)

=== Compilation albums ===
- Samoye novoye – samoye luchsheye (1995)
- Luchshiye pesni (2003)

=== Video albums ===
- Zhit nuzhno v kayf! (1994)
- Lada Dance (1997)
