= Anna Shulgina =

Russian actress and singer (born 1993)

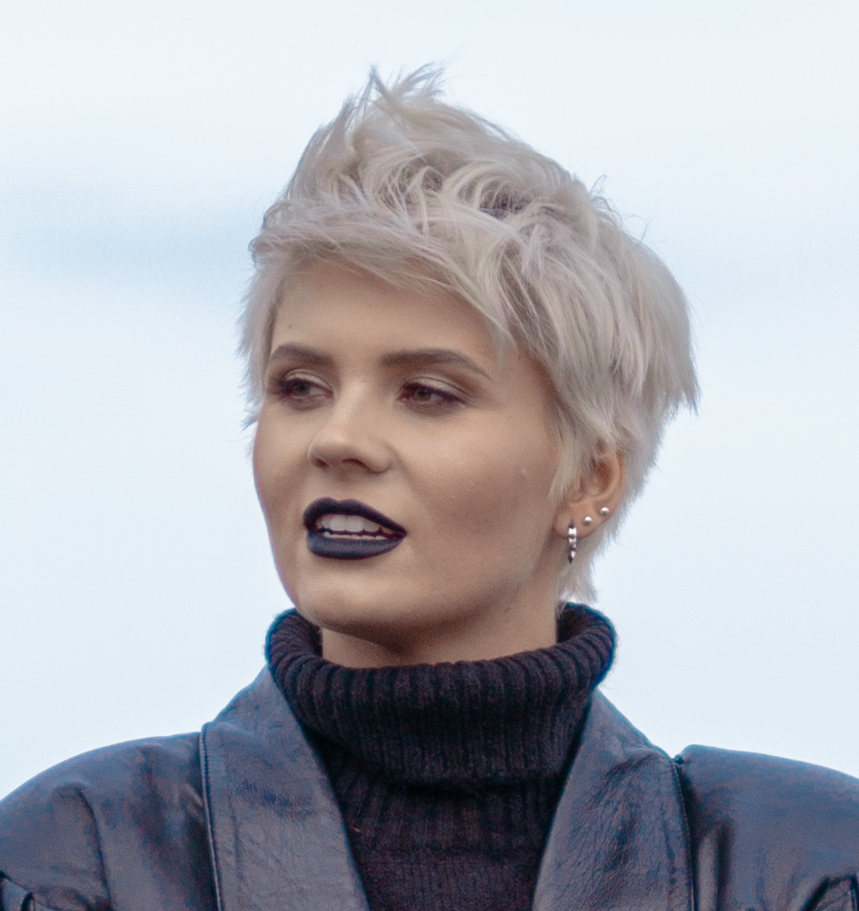
Anna Shulgina in 2018

Anna Alexandrovna Shulgina (Russian: Анна Александровна Шульгина; born June 21, 1993, in Moscow, Russia) is a Russian film and stage actress, folk-rock-singer and television presenter.

== Biography ==
Born in Moscow on June 21, 1993, in the family of the singer Valeriya and composer Alexander Shulgin.

In 2009, she graduated from the Moscow central school with in-depth study of specific subjects. In the same year he entered the Boris Shchukin Theatre Institute. In 2013 she made her debut as a television presenter in the program Our way on the TV channel Russia-1.

In 2014 she released her first single, “Give a Shance to Dream” in collaboration with the young hip-hop artist SLEM.
