= Soso Pavliashvili =

Russian singer (born 1964)

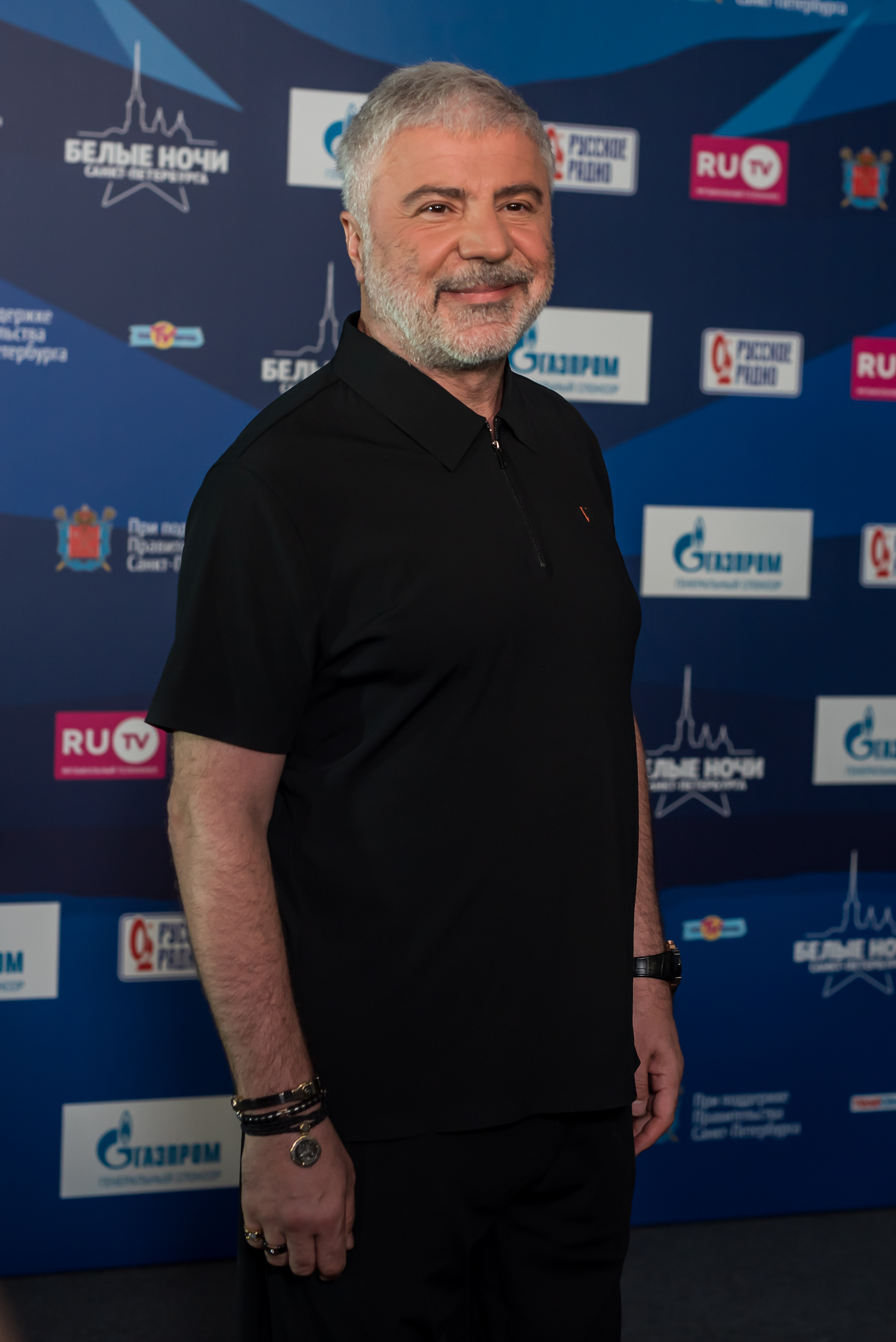

Background information
- Born: Ioseb Raminovich Pavliashvili; 29 June 1964 (age 62); Tbilisi, Georgian SSR, Soviet Union
- Genres: Pop, Blue-eyed soul, Pop-folk, Pop rock
- Occupations: Singer-songwriter, actor
- Instruments: Vocal, violin, piano
- Years active: 1988–present
- Labels: Melodiya, Misteria Zvuka, Monolit Records, All Star Music
- Website: soso-pavliashvili.su

Ioseb Raminovich "Soso" Pavliashvili (Russian: Иосиф Раминович "Сосо" Павлиашвили, Georgian: იოსებ რამინის ძე "სოსო" პავლიაშვილი; born 29 June 1964 in Tbilisi) is a Russian singer of ethnic Georgian descent.

Soso Pavliashvili was born 29 June 1964 in the Georgian capital of Tbilisi. He graduated from Tbilisi State Conservatoire as a violinist. Pavliashvili became a public figure at the age of 24 as a member of the ensemble Iveria. He achieved his first serious success in 1989 after speech on a poetry delivered at the Jurmala Young Pop Singer Competition. first album was released in 1993.

Over the course of his career Soso Pavliashvili has released a total of eight studio albums. He has worked with such artists as Mikhail Tanich, Viktor Reznikov, Simon Osiashvili, Georgi Karapetyan, Konstantin Gubin, and March Kavaleryan, among others.

Soso Pavliashvili splits his time between Tbilisi and Moscow, living in the latter city. He has 1 son and 2 daughters.
