= Nina Brodskaya =

Soviet singer

- Нина Александровна Бродская
- Born: December 11, 1947 or 1949; Moscow
- Education: Music College of the Moscow State Institute of Music (1965)
- Occupation: Soprano singer

Nina Brodskaya (Russian: Ни́на Алекса́ндровна Бро́дская; born 11 December 1947 or 1949, Moscow) is a Soviet singer (soprano), popular in the 1960s and 1970s.

== Biography ==
Nina Brodskaya was born in Moscow to a Jewish family. Her father, Alexander Brodsky, was a drummer in the Moscow Association of Musical Ensembles, and her mother, Basya Brodskaya, was a housewife.

She began studying music at the age of five. From the age of eight she studied at a children's music school in the piano class. Upon graduation, she entered the October Revolution Music Academy at the conducting and choral department. After graduating in 1965, Nina Brodskaya started working as a singer in the Eddie Rosner Jazz Orchestra, while continuing her music education at the All-Russia Creative Workshop of Variety Art. From the end of 1967, for about six months, she worked with Vesyolye Rebyata. Among the songs that made her famous were: "Love is a Ring" ("Любовь-кольцо") and "August" ("Август") by Frenkel, "One Snowflake is Not Yet Snow" ("Ты говоришь мне о любви" a.k.a. "Одна снежинка ещё не снег") by Kolmanovsky, "There's No Use in Your Coming to Me" ("Ходишь напрасно") and "First Love" ("Первая любовь") by Mazhukov. She is also famous for singing the song "January Blizzard" ("Звенит январская вьюга") by Zatsepin for the 1973 movie Ivan Vasilievich: Back to the Future. In the early 1970s, she was one of the most popular singers in the Soviet Union. From 1966 to 1978, more than 30 records with Brodskaya's recordings were released in the USSR. Since 1979 Nina Brodskaya lives and performs in the USA, since 1990s occasionally coming to Russia.

In 2017, the play "Thaw. Melodies of Fate" was staged in the Yekaterinburg Musical Comedy Theatre, dedicated to the works of Brodskaya, Aida Vedischeva and Larisa Mondrus.

== Discography ==
- 1974 – Nina Brodskaya
- 1992 – Moscow-New York
- 1995 – Priezhay v U.S.A.
- 2008 – Evreyskaya mama
- 2009 – Poydyom so mnoy!
