= Marina Khlebnikova =

Russian singer and actress (born 1965)

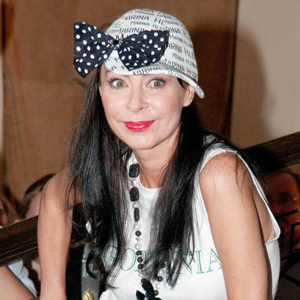
Khlebnikova in 2010

Marina Arnoldovna Khlebnikova (Russian: Мари́на Арно́льдовна Хле́бникова; born November 6, 1965, Moscow) is a Russian singer and actress, winner (second prize) of a Yalta Young Pop Singer Competition (1991), Golden Gramophone Award (1998), Pesnya goda (1998, 2001, 2002, 2004).

== Discography ==
Studio albums

- Stay (Russian: Останься; 1995)
- Bili Bohm (Russian: Билли Бом; 1996)
- Cup of Coffee (Russian: Чашка кофею; 1997)
- Photo Album (Russian: Фотоальбом; 1999)
- My Sun, Get Up! (Russian: Солнышко моё, вставай!; 2001)
- Cats of My Soul (Russian: Кошки моей души; 2005)
- Life (Russian: Жизнь; 2021)

Concert albums

- Live Collection (Russian: Живая коллекция; 1998, reissued in 2001)
- Live! (1999)

== Personal life ==
First husband Anton Loginov committed suicide in 2018. Her second husband became is businessman Mikhail Maidanich (born May 15, 1969). Daughter Dominika Khlebnikova (born in 1999). Marina collects stuffed animals and minerals.
