= Kris Kelmi =

Soviet and Russian musical artist (1955–2019)

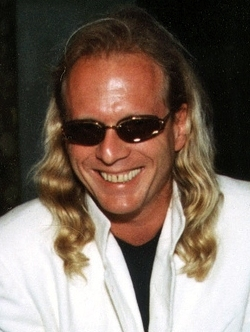
- Kris Kelmi (1997)

Background information
- Born: Anatoli Arievich Kelmi; 21 April 1955; Moscow, Russian SFSR, Soviet Union
- Died: 1 January 2019 (aged 63) Novoglagolevo, Naro-Fominsky District, Moscow Oblast, Russia
- Genres: Pop; Russian music; rock music
- Occupations: Singer; songwriter; pianist
- Instruments: Vocals; guitar; keyboards
- Years active: 1972–2019

Kris Kelmi (born Anatoli Arievich Kelmi, Russian: Анатолий Арьевич Кельми; 21 April 1955 – 1 January 2019) was a Soviet and Russian rock and pop musician and composer. He was a member of the bands Leap Summer, Autograph, and Rock Atelier. Some of his most well-known songs are Night Rendezvous, Closing the Ring, and Tired Taxi. Most online sources indicated that Kelmi was a pseudonym, and the musician's surname was Kalinkin. Kelmi denied this version. Kelmi believed that he most likely was Lithuanian on his father's side, explaining that there is a town in Lithuania called Kelmė, which is consonant with his last name. Kris took the nickname in 1972, after Dr. Kris Kelvin, the hero of Stanisław Lem's novel, Solaris.

Kris Kelmi died on the evening of 1 January 2019 at his Moscow Oblast home from cardiac arrest caused by alcohol abuse.
