= Anzhelika Varum =

Russian singer (born 1969)

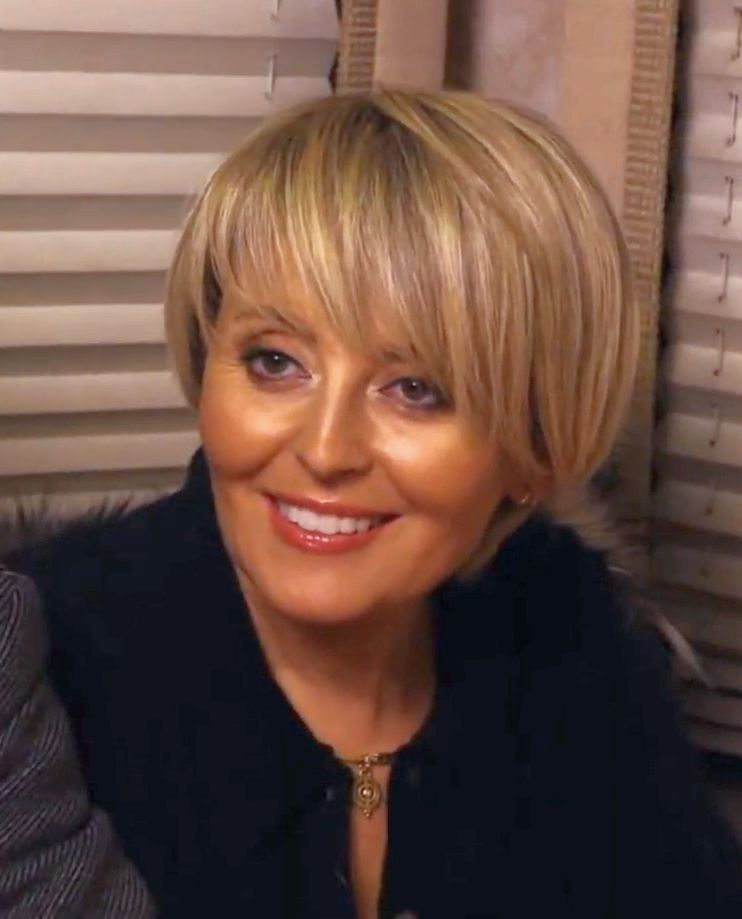
- Anzhelika Varum in 2020

Background information
- Born: 26 May 1969 (age 57); Lviv, Ukrainian SSR, Soviet Union
- Genres: Pop
- Occupation: Singer
- Instruments: Vocals, guitar
- Years active: 1991–present
- Website: www.avarum.com

Anzhelika Varum (Russian: Анжели́ка Вару́м), real name Maria Yurievna Varum (Russian: Мари́я Ю́рьевна Вару́м; born 26 May 1969), is a Russian singer and an Honored Artist of the Russian Federation. She released 12 albums, starting with "Good bye, moi mal'chik" (Good-bye, my boy) in 1991. More than 60 of her songs became hits, receiving heavy radio play. She is married to the Russian singer Leonid Agutin. Merited Artist of the Russian Federation (2011).

== Biography ==
Varum was born in Lviv to composer Yury Ignatievich Varum and theater producer Galina Mikhailovna Shapovalova. At the age of 5, she began to study the piano and, after starting school, she started to learn the guitar. She was part of the school's musical theater group and performed with them throughout Ukraine. After high school, Varum applied to the Boris Schukin Theater Institute in Moscow, but could not pass the entrance exams. She then began to work as a back-up singer at her father's music studio.

In 1990, Varum recorded a version of "Polunochniy kovboy" (Midnight cowboy) that soon became a hit, particularly after she performed it in the television show "Utrenneya zvezda" (Morning star) and at a concert at the Sports Complex "Olympic". On the back of that initial success, Varum released her first album, "Good bye, moi mal'chik" (Good-bye, my boy). The title song and the songs "Sosedniy parenek" (Neighborhood boy) and "Chelovek-svistok" (Human-whistle) became hits.

Two years later, Varum recorded the album "La-la-fa" that became hugely popular in Russia. It included the song "Khudozhnik kotoriy risuyet dozhd" (Painter who draws the rain) and the song "Gorodok" (Town), which became one of the singer's calling cards due to its using as a closing song for famous Russian humorous TV show with the same name. In 1994, Varum made it to the finals of the Russian annual festival "Pesnya goda" (Song of the year).

In 1995, Varum released a compilation of hits and a new album called "Osenniy dzhaz" (Autumn jazz) that won the "Ovation" award as the best album of 1995, with Varum taking the "Ovation" for best singer of the year. The next year, Varum released "V dvukh minutakh ot liubvi" (Two minutes from love). Around the same time, the perfume "Anzhelika Varum" made its debut on the Russian market. Varum remained prolific, releasing "Zimniya vishnia" (Winter cherry) in 1996. The songs "Eto vse dlia tebia" (It's all for you), "Drugaya zhenchina" (The other woman), and the title song all crowded the hit parades of leading Russian radio stations.

In 1997, Varum played in the musical "Poza emigranta" (The emigrant's pose) and won the "Chaika" award for her performance. She also began a creative collaboration with Leonid Agutin that soon turned into a romantic relationship. In 1999, Varum and Agutin had a baby girl whom they named Elisaveta. The same year, Varum released her seventh album, "Tol'ko ona" (Only she) and a collection of hits titled "The Best". She also appeared in a feature film, playing a leading role in Vasiliy Pichul's "Nebo v almazakh" (Night in diamonds).

In 2000, Varum released "Sluzhebniy roman" (Workplace romance), a collaborative album that she created together with Leonid Agutin. The couple also toured throughout Russia with a concert program titled "Polovina serdtsa" (Half of a heart).

In 2001, Varum created the "Varum Records Company", which she used as a vehicle for producing her own music and representing other artists. She released a new album in 2002 titled "Stop, lyubopytstvo" (Stop, curiosity). She also created two new concert programs, a solo program titled after the new album, and a duet program with Agutin called "Rimskiye kanikuly" (Roman holiday).

In 2003, she played in the film "Kamenskaya 3: Kogda bogi smeyutsia" (When gods laugh), a detective thriller. Later that year, she released the single "Pozhar" (Fire). The following year, Varum toured extensively with Agutin, giving live concerts in the United States, Germany, Israel, Belarus, Ukraine, and throughout Russia.

In 2005, she created a new concert program with Agutin called "Ty i Ya" (You and I), with which they toured throughout Europe and the United States. She also helped Agutin to record his first English language record. Created together with Al Di Meola and titled "Cosomopolitan Life", the album dropped in Europe in the spring of 2005 and quickly topped the charts. The album included the Varum and Agutin duet "If I'll get a chance".

After spending much of 2006 touring, Varum released a new album in 2007 called "Muzika" (Music) that included both new and old songs. This was followed up by another album in 2009 titled "Yesli on uidet" (If he leaves). For the first time in her career, Varum not only sang, but also wrote the lyrics for some of the songs.

In 2010 and 2011, Varum and Agutin gave a series of concerts in most of Russia's major cities, including a performance at the Kremlin in collaboration with the renowned Cuban musician Orlando "Maraca" Valle.

== Public position ==
In 2021, Varum "gave up Crimea for Ukraine" (that is, she stated that she categorically did not wish to perform on the peninsula). The singer explained:

I have not been going to Crimea for many years. I cannot, because I would end up on the "blacklists" and would not be able to come to Lviv. I have relatives there.

In 2022, she "protested against the special military operation" and expressed her view of the events, writing on social media in both Russian and Ukrainian that Russians were "cannon fodder" and that Russia as a country was "moving into hell". Varum clarified: "Any sane person understands that I am against it." She issued a "demand" that Presidents Vladimir Putin and Volodymyr Zelenskyy hold negotiations without intermediaries.

According to Alyona Zhigalova, Agutin and Varum "strongly supported Ukraine at concerts". One publication claimed that "by supporting Ukraine, the artists risk being designated 'foreign agents' in their homeland, but this does not concern them in the slightest".

In the spring of 2023, activists asked Moscow Oblast Governor Andrey Vorobyov to cancel Angelica Varum's show at Crocus City Hall.

In 2024, on the occasion of the singer's 55th birthday, a gala concert honoring her was broadcast on NTV with support from the Presidential Fund for Cultural Initiatives.

== Videos ==
1. 1991 — Babylon
2. 1991 — Barabashka
3. 1992 — Whistle Man
4. 1993 — Artist that Draws Rain
5. 1995 — Autumn Jazz
6. 1996 — Not Тoday
7. 1996 — Neither Answer nor Greetings
8. 1996 — Winter Сherry
9. 1997 — Another Woman
10. 1997 — Queen (duet with Leonid Agutin)
11. 1999 — All in your hands (duet with Leonid Agutin)
12. 2000 — Do not wait for me
13. 2000 — I Wanna Be Loved by You
14. 2001 — Will You Near You
15. 2001 — Stop Curiosity!
16. 2002 — If You Ever Someone Will Forgive Me (duet with Leonid Agutin)
17. 2002 — Fire
18. 2004 — The Вest (duet with Via slivki)
19. 2007 — You and me
20. 2007 — Two Roads, Two Ways (duet with Leonid Agutin)
21. 2008 — Where are you
22. 2009 — If He Will Go
23. 2009 — Let's forget
24. 2011 — How not to Think of You (duet with Leonid Agutin)
25. 2012 — Where are you
26. 2013 — Crazy
27. 2013 — I am always with you

== Discography ==
- 1991 – Good bye, moy mal'chik
- 1993 – La–la–fa
- 1995 – Collected works
- 1995 – Osenniy dzhaz (Autumn jazz)
- 1996 – V dvukh minutakh ot liubvi (Two minutes from love)
- 1996 – Zimniya vishnia (Winter cherry)
- 1998 – Tol'ko ona... (Only she)
- 1999 – The Best
- 2000 – Sluzhebniy roman (Workplace romance)
- 2002 – Stop, liubopytstvo (Stop, curiosity)
- 2007 – Muzika (Music)
- 2009 – Esli on uidyot (If he leaves)
- 2013 – Sumashedshaya (Crazy)
- 2016 – Zhenshchina shla (The woman was walking)
- 2018 – Na pauzu (Pause)
- 2018 – Grustnaya bossa (Sad bossa)

== Filmography ==
- 1992 – Julia
- 1995 – Old Songs on the Main (Old songs about what matters, a made–for–television musical)
- 1996 – Old Songs on the Main 2
- 1997 – Old Songs on the Main 3
- 1998 – Old Songs on the Main 4
- 1999 – Night in Diamonds as Vika
- 1999 – Dossier of Detective Dubrovsky as Lena Posadskaya
- 2000 – Old Songs on the Main P.S.
- 2003 – Kamensakaya 3: When the Gods Laugh as Svetlana Medvedeva
- 2005 – Twelve Сhairs as Ellochka liudoyedka (Ella man–eater)
- 2006 – First Fast
- 2008 – New Year's Eve on Channel 1
- 2009 – New Year's Eve on Channel 1
- 2010 – Beauty Requires...
