= Maxim Galkin =

Russian comedian (born 1976)

- Максим Галкин
- Galkin in 2026
- Born: Maxim Alexandrovich Galkin; 18 June 1976 (age 50); Naro-Fominsky District, Soviet Union
- Education: Russian State University for the Humanities
- Occupations: Humorist, parodist, television presenter
- Years active: 2000–present
- Spouse: Alla Pugacheva (m. 2011)
- Children: 2
- Website: officialmaximgalkin.com

Maxim Alexandrovich Galkin (Russian: Максим Александрович Галкин; born 18 June 1976) is a Russian and Israeli comedian, television presenter and singer. Galkin left Russia in March 2022 following the Russian invasion of Ukraine and was subsequently listed as a foreign agent by the Russian government.

== Biography ==
He first became famous as an impersonator and is known for his talent at parody and his duets with the famous Russian pop singer Alla Pugacheva and Ani Lorak.

Galkin was the host of the Russian version of Who Wants to Be a Millionaire? from 2001 to 2008.

From March 15, 2009, to April 24, 2016, he was the co-host of the project "Dancing with the Stars", initially paired with Darya Zlatopolskaya.

From November 12 to December 18, 2010, he was paired again with Darya Zlatopolskaya, the host of the project "Stilyagi Show".

In 2010, Galkin was one of the few comedians performing an impression, albeit 'light-hearted', of President Vladimir Putin, on Russia's Channel One TV channel.

On New Year's Eve in 2013, Galkin and the then popular Ukrainian comedian Volodymyr Zelenskyy performed together in a traditional New Year's program called “Little Blue Light” on the Russia-1 TV channel. Russian TV presenter Vladimir Solovyov, who later became a leading Kremlin propagandist, also appeared on the show as one of the presenters and danced in the audience during Galkin and Zelenskyy's performance.

After November 2016, he hosted a children's, talent show on TV "Best of all" and did so at least until mid-2017.

== Personal life ==
Galkin is Jewish, from his mother's side.

Since 2001, Galkin has been romantically involved with Soviet and Russian singer Alla Pugacheva. On 24 December 2011, the couple married, despite the significant age gap. On 18 September 2013 Galkin and Pugacheva became the biological parents of twins via a surrogate mother – Elizaveta and Harry. In 2022, Galkin and Pugacheva fled to Israel. In August 2022, Russian media reports suggested that his wife and children may have returned to Russia, and in September 2022, Russia listed him as a foreign agent. Since then, every post he uploads on Instagram has a 24-word disclaimer stating that he is a foreign agent. Russian media also puts an asterisk to his name stating that he is a foreign agent. In January 2024, Galkin was denied entry to Bali, Indonesia, at the request of the Russian government. Galkin's performances were also cancelled in Thailand and Kazakhstan. As of 2024, Pugacheva resided in Cyprus.

== Political views ==
Galkin has been openly critical about the Russian invasion of Ukraine. He accused the Russian authorities of hypocrisy and lies with respect to war crimes that Russia has committed in firing rockets at the Ukrainian city of Odesa, its siege and destruction of Mariupol and its atrocities in Bucha.

He spoke up negatively about the Russian gay propaganda law, comparing it to a 'witch-hunt', which is created only for political PR and public distraction from more important issues. However, he does not deem it necessary to legalize same-sex marriage and LGBT adoption because it can provoke a negative reaction in society.

== Awards ==
- Medal "For Faith and Goodness" of Kemerovo Oblast (2004)
- Order of Friendship (2006)
- Order of Honor of Kuzbass (2013)

== See also ==
- Russian emigration during the Russian invasion of Ukraine
