= Klavdiya Shulzhenko =

Soviet popular female singer and actress

Klavdiya Ivanovna Shulzhenko
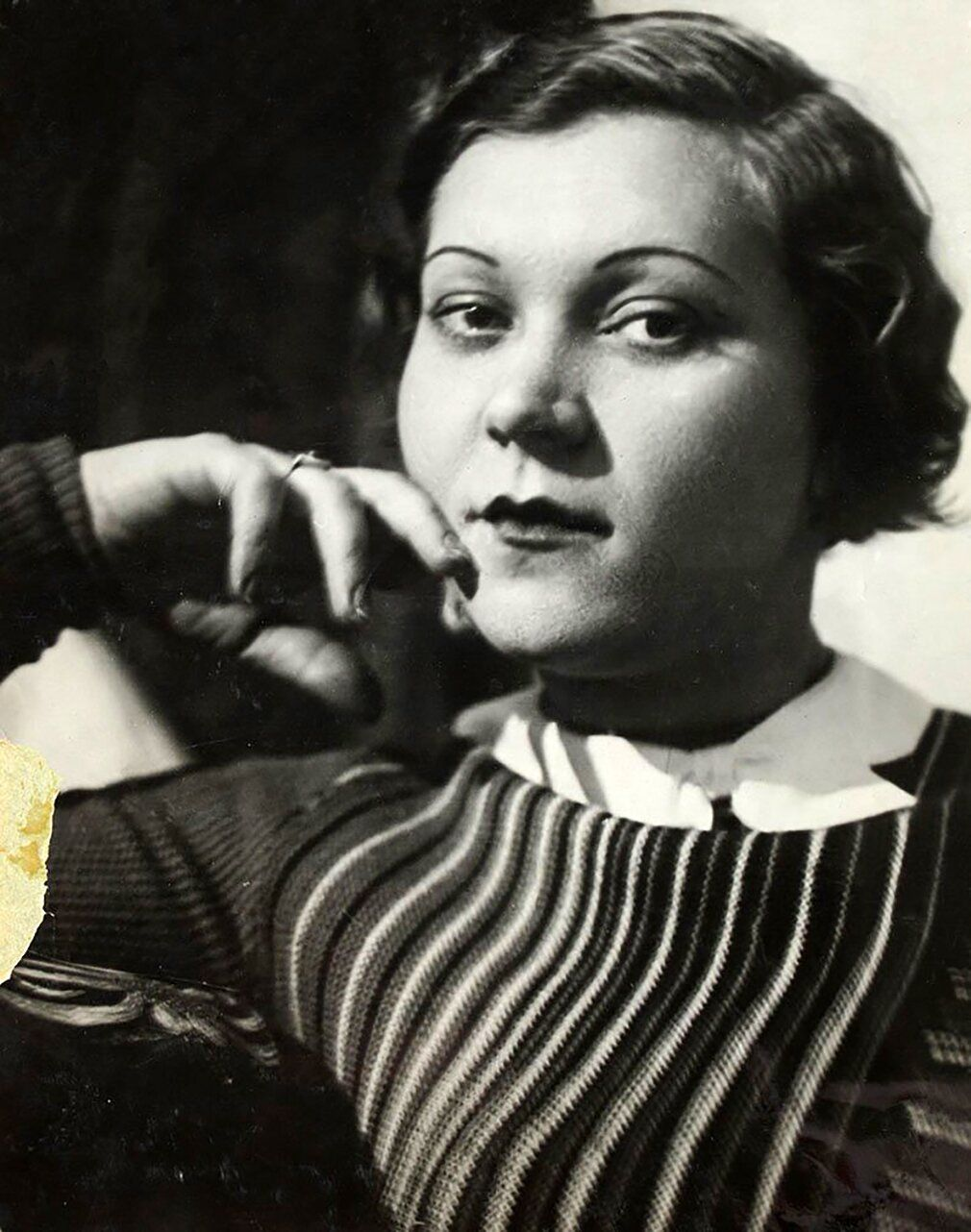
- 1934
- Born: March 24 [O.S. March 11] 1906; Kharkiv, Kharkov Governorate, Russian Empire
- Died: June 17, 1984 (aged 78); Moscow, Soviet Union
- Resting place: Novodevichy Cemetery
- Education: Kharkiv Conservatory
- Known for: Singer and actress

Klavdiya Ivanovna Shulzhenko (Russian: Кла́вдия Ива́новна Шульже́нко, Ukrainian: Клавдія Іванівна Шульженко; 24 March [O.S. 11 March] 1906 – June 17, 1984) was a Soviet popular female singer and actress.

== Biography ==
Shulzhenko started singing with jazz and pop bands in the late 1920s. She rose to fame in the late 1930s with her version of Sebastián Iradier's La Paloma. In 1939, she was awarded at the first all-Soviet competition of pop singers.

- A selection of Shulzhenko's cinema and TV appearances. The songs include "The Blue Headscarf" and "Let's Have a Smoke". With commentary by actor Igor Gorbachyov.

During World War II, Shulzhenko performed about a thousand concerts for Soviet soldiers in besieged Leningrad and elsewhere. The lyrics of one of her prewar songs, "The Blue Headscarf", were adapted so as to suit wartime realities. Another iconic song of the Eastern Front (World War II), "Let's Have a Smoke", was later used by Vladimir Menshov in his Oscar-winning movie Moscow Does Not Believe in Tears.

In 1945, Shulzhenko was awarded the Order of the Red Star. In 1971, she was named People's Artist of the USSR, "the highest possible accolade for a singer".

On April 10, 1976, Shulzhenko performed to an enraptured audience in the House of the Unions in what would become her most famous concert.

== See also ==
- Lyubov Orlova, another Soviet diva
