= Aleksander Serov =

Soviet-Russian singer (born 1951)

- Александр Серов
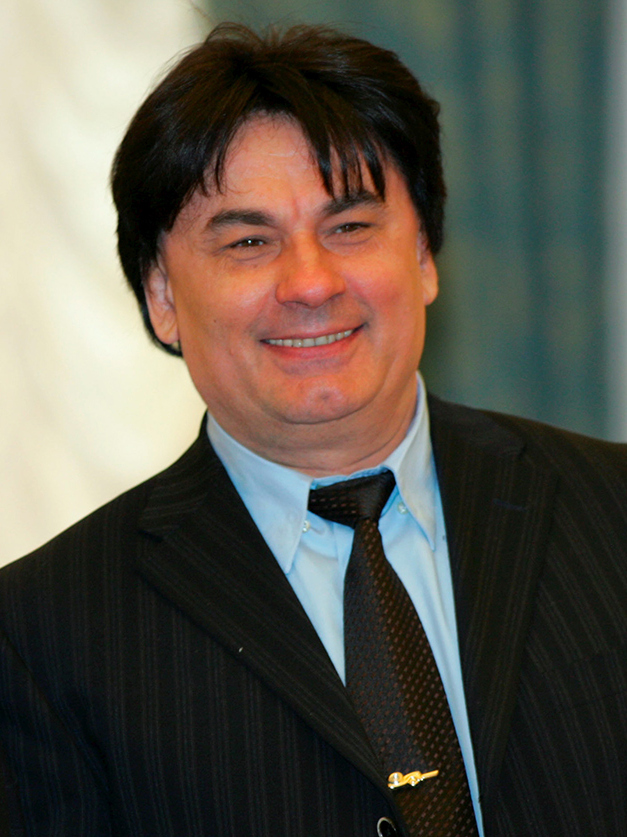
- Serov in 2005
- Born: Alexander Nikolayevich Serov; 24 March 1951 (age 75); Kovalivka, Mykolaiv Raion, Mykolaiv Oblast, Ukrainian SSR, Soviet Union
- Occupations: Singer, composer, arrangement, Instrumentalist
- Years active: 1969–present
- Title: People's Artist of Russia (2004)
- Website: alexander-serov.ru

"Ya lublu tebya do slez"
Sample of "Ya lublu tebya do slez" by Aleksander Serov (1995)

External videos
- Alexander Serov "How to be" (1988) on YouTube

Alexander Nikolayevich Serov (Russian: Александр Николаевич Серов; born 24 March 1951) is a Soviet and Russian singer.

He was born in Ukraine. He is a Russian popular singer who is best known for early success with the songs of Igor Krutoy. He has the honorary title People's Artist of Russia (2004).
