= The Masked Singer (Russian TV series) =

Russian reality singing television show

- Genre: Music competition
- Created by: Timur Vainstein
- Developed by: Weit Media
- Directed by: Yulia Sumacheva
- Presented by: Vyacheslav Makarov (Маска); Yuri Muzychenko (Маска. Танцы)
- Starring: Valeriya (1-); Philipp Kirkorov (1-); Regina Todorenko (1-); Timur Rodriguez (1-, Маска. Танцы); Garik Martirosyan (1); Aleksandr Revva (2); Timur Batrutdinov (3); Alexey Vorobyov (4); Guests (5); Stas Kostyushkin (6); Denis Klyaver (6 ep 3); Sergey Lazarev (7); Marina Kravets (6 ep 5); Seville (6 ep 5, 7 ep 2-3); Aleksandr Panayotov (7 ep 9); Egor Druzhinin (Маска. Танцы); Klava Koka (Маска. Танцы); Maria Gorban (Маска. Танцы); Sergey Svetlakov (Маска. Танцы)
- Country of origin: Russia
- Original language: Russian
- No. of seasons: 7

Production
- Production locations: Moscow, Glavkino
- Running time: 120-180 minutes

Original release
- Network: NTV
- Release: 1 March 2020 – present

The Masked Singer (Russian: Маска) is a Russian music competition television series, based on the Masked Singer franchise.

== Format ==
The show features celebrities performing songs while wearing head-to-toe costumes and face masks concealing their identities. Information about season's cast is strictly classified, as the participants not only signed a non-disclosure agreement, but also they are securely guarded behind the scene. Hints are given only in a short video clip before the cover. In a typical episode, the contestants are divided into groups. After concert conclude, the audience vote to choose a nominee in each group and then the panelists vote to choose one mask to reveal their identity. The process of elimination continues until three vocalists remain in the finale, which is broadcast live at the State Kremlin Palace, and one is declared the winner. The Golden Mask trophy is awarded as a prize.

The first host was Vyacheslav Makarov.

== Series overview ==
Season	Premiere	Finale	Winner	Runner-up	Third place	Fourth place
1	1 March 2020	26 April 2020	Anatoly Tsoy as "Lion"	Karina Koks as "Wolf"	Larisa Dolina as "Deer"	Anna Pletneva as "Parrot"
2	14 February 2021	2 May 2021	JONY as "Crocodile"	Yusif Eyvazov as "Llama"	Yulia Parshuta as "Snake"	Timur Batrutdinov as "Hare"
3	13 February 2022	1 May 2022	Ildar Abdrazakov as "Dragon"	Maria Zaitseva as "Anubis"	Alexey Vorobyov as "Monster"	Alsou as "Bee"
Маска. Танцы	9 October 2022	25 December 2022	Katya Adushkina as "Zebra"	Evgeny Papunaishvili as "Seahorse"	DAVA as "Brush"	Vladimir Marconi as "Black Swan"
4	12 February 2023	30 April 2023	Dima Bilan as "Mammoth Cub" & Sergey Lazarev as "Scorpion"		Lada Dance as "Poodle"	Elchin Azizov as "Mandrill"
5	18 February 2024	5 May 2024	Seville as "Raccoon"	Ani Lorak as "Cat"	Lusia Chebotina as "Butterfly"	Zurab Matua, Andrey Averin & Dmitry Sorokin as "Zmei Gorynich"
6	9 February 2025	27 April 2025	Aleksandr Panayotov as "Chief"	Mona as "Dalmatian"	Aleksey Goman as "Falcon"	Zhan Milimerov as "Boxer"
7	8 February 2026	26 April 2026	Polina Gagarina as "Giraffe"	Dmitriy Zhuravlyov as "Beaver"	SOCRAT as "Meerkat"	Alexandra Ursuliak as "Frog"

== Season 1 ==
=== Contestants ===
Stage name	Celebrity	Occupation	Episodes									
Stage name	Celebrity	Occupation	1	2	3	4	5	6	7	8	9	
Stage name	Celebrity	Occupation	1	2	3	4	5	6	7	8	A	B
Lion	Anatoly Tsoy	Singer	SAFE	WIN	WIN	SAFE	WIN	WIN	RISK	WIN	SAFE	WINNER
Wolf	Karina Koks	Singer	SAFE	SAFE	WIN	WIN	WIN	RISK	WIN	WIN	SAFE	RUNNER-UP
Deer	Larisa Dolina	Singer	WIN	WIN	SAFE	SAFE	WIN	WIN	WIN	RISK	SAFE	THIRD
Parrot	Anna Pletnyova	Singer	SAFE	SAFE	SAFE	WIN	WIN	WIN	WIN	WIN	FINALIST	
Panda	Vlad Topalov	Singer	WIN	SAFE	WIN	WIN	RISK	WIN	RISK	OUT		
Egg	Anton Lirnik	Comedian	SAFE	RISK	RISK	RISK	WIN	RISK	OUT			
Cloud	Svetlana Masterkova	Runner	SAFE	SAFE	SAFE	RISK	RISK	OUT				
Spider	Lena Katina	Singer	WIN	WIN	SAFE	SAFE	OUT					
Robot	Oxana Fedorova	Presenter	RISK	RISK	RISK	OUT						
Elephant	Alexey Glyzin	Singer	SAFE	SAFE	OUT							
Ice Cream	Stas Kostyushkin	Singer	RISK	OUT								
Chameleon	Vadim Takmenev	Journalist	OUT									
Dinosaur	Sergey Lazarev	Singer										
Mirror Woman	Natalia Gulkina	Singer										
Bunny	Yulianna Karaulova	Singer										
Lion Cub	Alexandr Shoua	Singer										

The masked singer won their face-off and remained in the competition.
The masked singer lost their face-off and was in the bottom three/two, but was not eliminated.
The masked singer was safe from elimination.
The mask was a guest and was immediately unmasked after their performance.
The masked singer was eliminated from the competition and unmasked upon their elimination.
The masked singer won the competition.
The masked singer finished second.
The masked singer finished third.
The masked singer finished fourth.

=== Episodes ===
==== Week 1 (1 March) ====
Performances on the first episode
#	Stage name	Song	Identity	Result	
1	Ice Cream	"Зелёный свет" by Valery Leontiev	undisclosed	35,6%	RISK
2	Lion	"Chandelier" by Sia	undisclosed	18%	SAFE
3	Spider	"Ту-лу-ла" by Yulia Chicherina	undisclosed	14,4%	WIN
4	Elephant	"Я — то, что надо" by Valeriy Syutkin	undisclosed	32%	SAFE
5	Egg	"Всё будет хорошо" by Verka Serduchka	undisclosed	27,6%	SAFE
6	Robot	"Habanera" from Carmen	undisclosed	35,9%	RISK
7	Parrot	"Lambada" by Kaoma	undisclosed	29,7%	SAFE
8	Deer	"Танцы на стёклах" by Maxim Fadeev	undisclosed	6,8%	WIN
9	Cloud	"На Титанике" by Lolita	undisclosed	18,8%	SAFE
10	Panda	"Perfect" by Ed Sheeran	undisclosed	18,2%	WIN
11	Chameleon	"Зацепила" by Arthur Pirozhkov	Vadim Takmenev	34,4%	OUT
12	Wolf	"Sex Bomb" by Tom Jones and Mousse T.	undisclosed	28,6%	SAFE

==== Week 2 (8 March) ====
Performances on the second episode
#	Stage name	Song	Identity	Result	
1	Parrot	"Улыбайся" by IOWA	undisclosed	24,2%	SAFE
2	Robot	"Я вышла на Пикадилли" by Laima Vaikule	undisclosed	64,7%	RISK
3	Panda	"Beggin" by The Four Seasons	undisclosed	6,3%	SAFE
4	Spider	"Young and Beautiful" by Lana Del Rey	undisclosed	4,8%	WIN
5	Egg	"Песня про яйца" by Diskoteka Avariya	undisclosed	44,3%	RISK
6	Deer	"Human" by Rag'n'Bone Man	undisclosed	6,7%	WIN
7	Elephant	"Cheap Thrills" by Sia	undisclosed	44,2%	SAFE
8	Wolf	"Я тебя не прощу никогда" by Polina Gagarina	undisclosed	8,8%	SAFE
9	Cloud	"Курю" by Elena Vaenga	undisclosed	41,3%	SAFE
10	Ice Cream	"Есть только миг" by Oleg Anofriyev	Stas Kostyushkin	54,6%	OUT
11	Lion	"Drunk Groove" by Maruv and Boosin	undisclosed	4,1%	WIN

==== Week 3 (15 March) ====
Performances on the third episode
#	Stage name	Song	Identity	Result	
1	Cloud	"Широка река" by Nadezhda Kadysheva	undisclosed	25,5%	SAFE
2	Spider	"Маршрутка" by IOWA	undisclosed	23,4%	SAFE
3	Elephant	"Первый снег" by Moral Codex	Alexey Glyzin	39,1%	OUT
4	Wolf	"Dance Monkey" by Tones and I	undisclosed	12%	WIN
5	Panda	"Остров" by Leonid Agutin	undisclosed	14,4%	WIN
6	Parrot	"Go Bananas" by Little Big	undisclosed	29,4%	SAFE
7	Egg	"Луч солнца золотого" by Muslim Magomayev	undisclosed	56,2%	RISK
8	Robot	"Volare" by Domenico Modugno	undisclosed	61,8%	RISK
9	Lion	"Там нет меня" by Igor Nikolaev	undisclosed	16,7%	WIN
10	Deer	"Il dolce suono" from The Fifth Element	undisclosed	21,5%	SAFE

==== Week 4 (22 March) ====
Performances on the fourth episode
#	Stage name	Song	Identity	Result	
1	Egg	"Моя бабушка курит трубку" by Garik Sukachov	undisclosed	47,7%	RISK
2	Spider	"Poker Face" by Lady Gaga	undisclosed	38,1%	SAFE
3	Wolf	"Отпустите меня в Гималаи" by Masha Rasputina	undisclosed	14,2%	WIN
4	Parrot	"Айсберг" by Alla Pugacheva	undisclosed	31,3%	WIN
5	Lion	"Numb" by Linkin Park	undisclosed	34,2%	SAFE
6	Cloud	"Посмотри в глаза" by Natalya Vetlitskaya	undisclosed	34,5%	RISK
7	Robot	"Экспонат" by Leningrad	Oxana Fedorova	43,3%	OUT
8	Deer	"Снег" by Nikolai Noskov	undisclosed	35,4%	SAFE
9	Panda	"Umbrella" by The Baseballs	undisclosed	21,3%	WIN

==== Week 5 (29 March) ====
Performances on the fifth episode
#	Stage name	Song	Identity	Result
1	Cloud	"А я всё летала" by Blestyashchiye	undisclosed	RISK
2	Deer	"I Breathe" by Vacuum	undisclosed	WIN
3	Egg	"Мышь" by Philipp Kirkorov	undisclosed	WIN
4	Spider	"Небо Лондона" by Zemfira	Lena Katina	OUT
5	Parrot	"Freedom" by George Michael	undisclosed	WIN
6	Panda	"Это всё..." by DDT	undisclosed	RISK
7	Wolf	"Creep" by Radiohead	undisclosed	WIN
8	Lion	"Позови меня с собой" by Alla Pugacheva	undisclosed	WIN

==== Week 6 (5 April) ====
Performances on the sixth episode
#	Stage name	Song	Identity	Result
1	Panda	"Despacito" by Luis Fonsi feat. Daddy Yankee	undisclosed	WIN
2	Wolf	"Самба белого мотылька" by Valery Meladze	undisclosed	RISK
3	Parrot	"Часики" by Valeriya	undisclosed	WIN
4	Egg	"Ain't No Sunshine" by Bill Withers	undisclosed	RISK
5	Cloud	"Quizás, quizás, quizás" by Nat King Cole	Svetlana Masterkova	OUT
6	Lion	"I Got You (I Feel Good)" by James Brown	undisclosed	WIN
7	Deer	"Замок из дождя" by Vladimir Presnyakov	undisclosed	WIN

==== Week 7 (12 April) ====
Performances on the seventh episode
#	Stage name	Song	Identity	Result
1	Dinosaur	"Жестокая любовь" by Philipp Kirkorov	Sergey Lazarev	GUEST
2	Deer	"In the Shadows" by The Rasmus	undisclosed	WIN
3	Panda	"Рюмка водки на столе" by Grigory Leps	undisclosed	RISK
4	Egg	"Танцы" by Andrey Gubin	Anton Lirnik	OUT
5	Wolf	"Runnin' (Lose It All)" by Naughty Boy feat. Beyoncé and Arrow Benjamin	undisclosed	WIN
6	Mirror Woman	"Бриллианты" by Nu Virgos	Natalia Gulkina	GUEST
7	Lion	"Блюз" by Zemfira	undisclosed	RISK
8	Parrot	"Мaрина" by Philipp Kirkorov	undisclosed	WIN

==== Week 8 (19 April) ====
Performances on the eighth episode
#	Stage name	Song	Identity	Result
1	Bunny	"Притяжения больше нет" by Nu Virgos and Valery Meladze	Yulianna Karaulova	GUEST
2	Panda	"Ай-ай-ай" by Leonid Agutin and Tomas N'evergreen	Vlad Topalov	OUT
3	Parrot	"Les Champs-Élysées" by Joe Dassin	undisclosed	WIN
4	Wolf	"Делу время" by Alla Pugacheva	undisclosed	WIN
5	Lion Cub	"Трава у дома" by Zemlyane	Alexander Shoua	GUEST
6	Deer	"Нас не догонят" by t.A.T.u.	undisclosed	RISK
7	Lion	"Unchain My Heart" by Joe Cocker	undisclosed	WIN

==== Week 9 (26 April) ====
===== Round One =====
Performances on the final episode – round one
#	Stage name	Song	Identity	Result
1	Parrot	"Eternal Flame" by The Bangles	Anna Pletnyova	FINALIST
2	Lion	"Feeling Good" by Muse	undisclosed	SAFE
3	Wolf	"Улетай на крыльях ветра" from Prince Igor	undisclosed	SAFE
4	Deer	"Cosmic Girl" by Jamiroquai	undisclosed	SAFE

===== Round Two =====
Performances on the final episode – round two
#	Stage name	Song	Identity	Result
1	Deer	"Эхо любви" by Anna German	Larisa Dolina	THIRD
2	Wolf	"Queen of the Night" by Whitney Houston	Karina Koks	RUNNER-UP
3	Lion	"Нелюбимая" by A'Studio	Anatoly Tsoi	WINNER

== Season 2 ==
=== Contestants ===
Stage name	Celebrity	Occupation	Episodes												
Stage name	Celebrity	Occupation	1 (Note: No one was unmasked this episode.)	2	3	4	5	6	7	8	9	10	11	12	
Stage name	Celebrity	Occupation	1	2	3	4	5	6	7	8	9	10	11	A	B
Crocodile	JONY	Singer	SAFE	WIN	WIN	SAFE	SAFE	WIN	SAFE	RISK	WIN	WIN	SAFE	SAFE	WINNER
Llama	Yusif Eyvazov	Opera singer	SAFE	SAFE	SAFE	SAFE	WIN	SAFE	WIN	RISK	SAFE	RISK	WIN	SAFE	RUNNER-UP
Snake	Yulia Parshuta	Singer	WIN	WIN	SAFE	SAFE	RISK	SAFE	RISK	WIN	WIN	WIN	WIN	SAFE	THIRD
Hare	Timur Batrutdinov	Comedian	SAFE	SAFE	WIN	SAFE	WIN	WIN	SAFE	WIN	WIN	RISK	RISK	FINALIST	
Nevalyashka Doll	Stas Piekha	Singer	RISK	WIN	WIN	WIN	WIN	SAFE	WIN	WIN	RISK	WIN	OUT		
Rhino	Kirill Turichenko	Singer	SAFE	SAFE	SAFE	SAFE	SAFE	RISK	WIN	WIN	RISK	OUT			
White Eagle	Mark Tishman	Singer	SAFE	SAFE	SAFE	WIN	RISK	SAFE	SAFE	RISK	OUT				
Unicorn	Irina Dubtsova	Singer	WIN	SAFE	RISK	WIN	SAFE	WIN	RISK	OUT					
Sun	Marina Kravets	Comedienne	WIN	SAFE	RISK	SAFE	SAFE	RISK	OUT						
Pink Panther	Olga Buzova	Media personality	SAFE	RISK	SAFE	RISK	SAFE	OUT							
Banana	Yuri Stoyanov	Actor	RISK	SAFE	SAFE	RISK	OUT								
Penguin	Aziza	Singer	SAFE	RISK	SAFE	OUT									
Pineapple	Iosif Prigozhin	Producer	RISK	SAFE	OUT										
Black Panther	Svetlana Khorkina	Gymnast	SAFE	OUT											
Sultan	Bedros Kirkorov	Singer													
Baby Elephant	Glukoza	Singer													
Gena the Crocodile	Sergey Penkin	Singer													
Little Bear	Evelina Bledans	Actress													

The masked singer won their face-off and remained in the competition.
The masked singer lost their face-off and was in the bottom three/two, but was not eliminated.
The masked singer was safe from elimination.
The mask was a guest and was immediately unmasked after their performance.
The masked singer was eliminated from the competition and unmasked upon their elimination.
The masked singer won the competition.
The masked singer finished second.
The masked singer finished third.
The masked singer finished fourth.

=== Episodes ===
==== Week 1 (14 February) ====
Performances on the first episode
#	Stage name	Song	Identity	Result	
1	Rhino	"Паранойя" by Nikolai Noskov	undisclosed	16,7%	SAFE
2	Penguin	"My Heart Will Go On" by Celine Dion	undisclosed	17,7%	SAFE
3	Banana	"Яблони" by Lyapis Trubetskoy	undisclosed	32,3%	RISK
4	Sun	"Ain't Nobody" by Rufus and Chaka Khan	undisclosed	10,7%	WIN
5	Black Panther	"Плохая девочка" by Vintage	undisclosed	22,6%	SAFE
6	Unicorn	"Bring Me to Life" by Evanescence	undisclosed	13,3%	WIN
7	Pineapple	"Hafanana" by Afric Simone	undisclosed	32,6%	RISK
8	Llama	"Я люблю тебя до слёз" by Alexander Serov	undisclosed	22,1%	SAFE
9	Pink Panther	"Let's Get Loud" by Jennifer Lopez	undisclosed	17,1%	SAFE
10	Hare	"Невеста?" by Mumiy Troll	undisclosed	14,9%	SAFE
11	Snake	"Du hast" by Rammstein	undisclosed	9,7%	WIN
12	Nevalyashka Doll	"18 мне уже" by Ruki Vverh!	undisclosed	37,5%	RISK
13	White Eagle	"Как упоительны в России вечера" by Bely Oryol	undisclosed	31,8%	SAFE
14	Crocodile	"Mambo No. 5 (A Little Bit Of...)" by Lou Bega	undisclosed	21%	SAFE

==== Week 2 (21 February) ====
Performances on the second episode
#	Stage name	Song	Identity	Result	
1	Unicorn	"Под гипнозом" by Artik & Asti	undisclosed	24,6%	SAFE
2	Pineapple	"Я тебя люблю" by Nikolai Noskov	undisclosed	17,7%	SAFE
3	Llama	"Livin' la Vida Loca" by Ricky Martin	undisclosed	16,6%	SAFE
4	Penguin	"Я шагаю по Москве" from "Walking the Streets of Moscow"	undisclosed	29,4%	RISK
5	Crocodile	"Caruso" by Lucio Dalla	undisclosed	12,8%	WIN
6	Banana	"Sway" by Dean Martin	undisclosed	31,9%	SAFE
7	Pink Panther	"Я у твоих ног" by Natalia Vlasova	undisclosed	42,9%	RISK
8	Rhino	"Belle" from Notre-Dame de Paris	undisclosed	9,9%	SAFE
9	White Eagle	"Неземная" by Max Barskih	undisclosed	11%	SAFE
10	Nevalyashka Doll	"Skyfall" by Adele	undisclosed	4,3%	WIN
11	Sun	"Пьяное солнце" by Alekseev	undisclosed	14,3%	SAFE
12	Black Panther	"Снег идёт" by Glukoza	Svetlana Khorkina	51,9%	OUT
13	Hare	"Любимка" by Niletto	undisclosed	22,8%	SAFE
14	Snake	"7 Rings" by Ariana Grande	undisclosed	11%	WIN

==== Week 3 (28 February) ====
Performances on the third episode
#	Stage name	Song	Identity	Result	
1	White Eagle	"Полетели" by Philipp Kirkorov	undisclosed	9,5%	SAFE
2	Pineapple	"Havana" by Camila Cabello and Young Thug	Iosif Prigozhin	31,3%	OUT
3	Penguin	"Hijo de la Luna" by Mecano	undisclosed	29,1%	SAFE
4	Crocodile	"Кружит" by MONATIK	undisclosed	5,6%	WIN
5	Pink Panther	"Love You like a Love Song" by Selena Gomez & the Scene	undisclosed	24,5%	SAFE
6	Banana	"Мы любим буги-вуги" by Secret	undisclosed	20,5%	SAFE
7	Unicorn	"Run to You" by Whitney Houston	undisclosed	44,5%	RISK
8	Llama	"Куда уехал цирк?" by Valery Leontiev	undisclosed	18,9%	SAFE
9	Hare	"Февраль" by Leonid Agutin and Anzhelika Varum	undisclosed	16,3%	WIN
10	Sun	"SuperSTAR" by LOBODA	undisclosed	40,9%	RISK
11	Rhino	"Беги по небу" by Maxim Fadeev	undisclosed	32,3%	SAFE
12	Snake	"Ты не верь слезам" by Shura	undisclosed	17,7%	SAFE
13	Nevalyashka Doll	"Наедине" by Nyusha	undisclosed	9,1%	WIN

==== Week 4 (7 March) ====
Performances on the fourth episode
#	Stage name	Song	Identity	Result	
1	Rhino	"This Love" by Maroon 5	undisclosed	17,2%	SAFE
2	Pink Panther	"Mi Mi Mi" by Serebro	undisclosed	56,1%	RISK
3	Crocodile	"Странник" by Vladimir Presnyakov	undisclosed	13,9%	SAFE
4	Unicorn	"О боже, какой мужчина" by Natali	undisclosed	12,8%	WIN
5	Hare	"Лети за мной" by Maxim Fadeev	undisclosed	16,3%	SAFE
6	Banana	"Белая зима" by Sofia Rotaru	undisclosed	51,4%	RISK
7	Snake	"Полчеловека" by Rita Dakota	undisclosed	17,5%	SAFE
8	White Eagle	"Relax, Take It Easy" by Mika	undisclosed	14,8%	WIN
9	Penguin	"Ах, мамочка..." by Marina Devyatova	Aziza	47,8%	OUT
10	Sun	"Wrecking Ball" by Miley Cyrus	undisclosed	22,9%	SAFE
11	Llama	"Ну и что" by Russkiye	undisclosed	15,2%	SAFE
12	Nevalyashka Doll	"What a Wonderful World" by Louis Armstrong	undisclosed	14,1%	WIN

==== Week 5 (14 March) ====
Performances on the fifth episode
#	Stage name	Song	Identity	Result	
1	Banana	"Canción del Mariachi" by Antonio Banderas and Los Lobos	Yuri Stoyanov	44,9%	OUT
2	Pink Panther	"Зеленые волны" by Zivert	undisclosed	44,8%	SAFE
3	Rhino	"Небо это я" by Sofia Rotaru	undisclosed	6,7%	SAFE
4	Nevalyashka Doll	"Ghostbusters" by Ray Parker Jr.	undisclosed	3,6%	WIN
5	White Eagle	"Девчонки полюбили не меня" by Leprikonsy	undisclosed	34,2%	RISK
6	Sun	"Шагай" by Polina Gagarina	undisclosed	20,5%	SAFE
7	Hare	"Shape of My Heart" by Sting	undisclosed	16,8%	WIN
8	Unicorn	"...Baby One More Time" by Britney Spears	undisclosed	28,5%	SAFE
9	Crocodile	"Virtual Insanity" by Jamiroquai	undisclosed	36,8%	SAFE
10	Snake	"Цветок и нож" by Nu Virgos	undisclosed	42%	RISK
11	Llama	"You Raise Me Up" by Josh Groban	undisclosed	21,2%	WIN

==== Week 6 (21 March) ====
Performances on the sixth episode
#	Stage name	Song	Identity	Result	
1	Pink Panther	"Barbie Girl" by Aqua	Olga Buzova	71,1%	OUT
2	Llama	"Я просто люблю тебя" by Dima Bilan	undisclosed	9,5%	SAFE
3	White Eagle	"Rise Like a Phoenix" by Conchita Wurst	undisclosed	10,5%	SAFE
4	Unicorn	"Комета" by JONY	undisclosed	8,9%	WIN
5	Rhino	"Улица роз" by Aria	undisclosed	49,2%	RISK
6	Hare	"Тучи" by Ivanushki International	undisclosed	20,3%	WIN
7	Snake	"Just Give Me a Reason" by Pink feat. Nate Ruess	undisclosed	30,5%	SAFE
8	Nevalyashka Doll	"Летний дождь" by Leonid Agutin	undisclosed	44,5%	SAFE
9	Sun	"Je veux" by Zaz	undisclosed	46,1%	RISK
10	Crocodile	"Кофе — мой дру" by Nervy	undisclosed	9,4%	WIN

==== Week 7 (28 March) ====
Performances on the seventh episode
#	Stage name	Song	Identity	Result	
1	White Eagle	"Плачь, детка!" by Arthur Pirozhkov	undisclosed	39,8%	SAFE
2	Sun	"Солнце" by Ani Lorak	Marina Kravets	42%	OUT
3	Nevalyashka Doll	"Supergirl" by Reamonn	undisclosed	18,2%	WIN
4	Unicorn	"I Kissed a Girl" by Katy Perry	undisclosed	60,8%	RISK
5	Rhino	"Adagio" by Lara Fabian	undisclosed	15,5%	WIN
6	Crocodile	"Хоп хей лала-лей" by Leonid Agutin	undisclosed	23,7%	SAFE
7	Snake	"Я не могу без тебя" by Valery Meladze	undisclosed	42,4%	RISK
8	Hare	"Zombie" by The Cranberries	undisclosed	39%	SAFE
9	Llama	"The Show Must Go On" by Queen	undisclosed	18,6%	WIN

==== Week 8 (4 April) ====
Performances on the eighth episode
#	Stage name	Song	Identity	Result	
1	Nevalyashka Doll	"Ах, Самара-городок" by Nadezhda Kadysheva	undisclosed	30,3%	WIN
2	Unicorn	"Стена" by Larisa Dolina	Irina Dubtsova	69,7%	OUT
3	White Eagle	"Ты где-то" by Gosti iz Budushchego	undisclosed	51,1%	RISK
4	Snake	"Императрица" by Irina Allegrova	undisclosed	48,9%	WIN
5	Rhino	"Vitamin D" by MONATIK	undisclosed	47,5%	WIN
6	Crocodile	"It's a Man's Man's Man's World" by James Brown	undisclosed	52,5%	RISK
7	Llama	"Любовь, похожая на сон" by Alla Pugacheva	undisclosed	56%	RISK
8	Hare	"Gangnam Style" by PSY	undisclosed	44%	WIN

==== Week 9 (11 April) ====
Performances on the ninth episode
#	Stage name	Song	Identity	Result	
1	White Eagle	"Ночь" by Andrey Gubin	Mark Tishman	46,6%	OUT
2	Llama	"Still Loving You" by Scorpions	undisclosed	32,4%	SAFE
3	Hare	"Toxic" by Britney Spears	undisclosed	21%	WIN
4	Rhino	"Мой рай" by MakSim	undisclosed	56%	RISK
5	Snake	"Fighter" by Christina Aguilera	undisclosed	44%	WIN
6	Nevalyashka Doll	"Глупые люди" by Hi-Fi	undisclosed	67,4	RISK
7	Crocodile	"Whataya Want from Me" by Adam Lambert	undisclosed	32,6%	WIN

==== Week 10 (18 April) ====
Performances on the tenth episode
#	Stage name	Song	Identity	Result
1	Sultan	"Если б я был султан..." by Yuri Nikulin	Bedros Kirkorov	GUEST
2	Nevalyashka Doll	"Bad Romance" by Lady Gaga	undisclosed	WIN
3	Llama	"Как молоды мы были" by Alexander Gradsky	undisclosed	RISK
4	Hare	"Dragostea din tei" by O-Zone	undisclosed	RISK
5	Crocodile	"Синяя вечность" by Muslim Magomayev	undisclosed	WIN
6	Baby Elephant	"Плачу на техно" by Cream Soda & HLEB	Glukoza	GUEST
7	Rhino	"Мы так нелепо разошлись" by Philipp Kirkorov	Kirill Turichenko	OUT
8	Snake	"Taki Rari" by Yma Sumac	undisclosed	WIN

==== Week 11 (25 April) ====
Performances on the eleventh episode
#	Stage name	Song	Identity	Result
1	Gena the Crocodile	"До свиданья, мама" by Moral Codex	Sergey Penkin	GUEST
2	Nevalyashka Doll	"Crying in the Rain" by A-ha	Stas Piekha	OUT
3	Snake	"Одно и то же" by IOWA	undisclosed	WIN
4	Crocodile	"Take Me to Church" by Hozier	undisclosed	SAFE
5	Little Bear	"На стиле" by Vremya i Steklo	Evelina Bledans	GUEST
6	Hare	"Кукушка" by Viktor Tsoi	undisclosed	RISK
7	Llama	"S.O.S. d'un terrien en détresse" by Grégory Lemarchal	undisclosed	WIN

==== Week 12 (2 May) ====
===== Round One =====
Performances on the final episode – round one
#	Stage name	Song	Identity	Result
1	Llama	"Diva" by Philipp Kirkorov	undisclosed	SAFE
2	Snake	"Maybe I Maybe You" by Scorpions	undisclosed	SAFE
3	Hare	"Белая ночь" by Viktor Saltykov	Timur Batrutdinov	FINALIST
4	Crocodile	"Вдвоём" by Maxim Fadeev and Nargiz	undisclosed	SAFE

===== Round Two =====
Performances on the final episode – round two
#	Stage name	Song	Identity	Result
1	Snake	"Колыбельная" by Polina Gagarina	Yulia Parshuta	THIRD
2	Crocodile	"Uptown Funk" by Mark Ronson feat. Bruno Mars	JONY	WINNER
3	Llama	"Ave Maria" by Maria Callas	Yusif Eyvazov	RUNNER-UP

== Season 3 ==
=== Contestants ===
Stage name	Celebrity	Occupation	Episodes												
Stage name	Celebrity	Occupation	1	2	3 (Note: The episode was postponed due to the political situation in Ukraine.)	4	5	6	7	8	9	10	11	12	
Stage name	Celebrity	Occupation	1	2	3	4	5	6	7	8	9	10	11	A	B
Dragon	Ildar Abdrazakov	Opera singer	SAFE	SAFE	SAFE	WIN	WIN	SAFE	WIN	WIN	WIN	WIN	WIN	SAFE	WINNER
Anubis	Maria Zaitseva	Singer	SAFE	WIN	WIN	SAFE	SAFE	SAFE	SAFE	WIN	SAFE	WIN	RISK	SAFE	RUNNER-UP
Monster	Alexey Vorobyov	Singer	RISK	WIN	WIN	WIN	SAFE	WIN	WIN	RISK	WIN	RISK	WIN	SAFE	THIRD
Bee	Alsou	Singer	SAFE	SAFE	SAFE	SAFE	SAFE	RISK	WIN	SAFE	RISK	WIN	WIN	FINALIST	
Fly Agaric	Evgeny Dyatlov	Actor	SAFE	RISK	WIN	WIN	WIN	WIN	SAFE	SAFE	RISK	RISK	OUT		
Capricorn	Nikita Presnyakov	Singer	WIN	WIN	SAF	SAFE	WIN	SAFE	RISK	WIN	WIN	OUT			
Donut	Irina Ponarovskaya	Singer	RISK	SAFE	SAFE	RISK	SAFE	WIN	RISK	RISK	OUT				
Baby	Ruslan Alekhno	Singer	SAFE	RISK	SAFE	SAFE	RISK	SAFE	SAFE	OUT					
Leopard	Mari Kraimbrery	Singer	WIN	SAFE	RISK	SAFE	SAFE	RISK	OUT						
Octopus	Natalia Podolskaya	Singer	WIN	SAFE	SAFE	RISK	RISK	OUT							
Joker	Navai	Rapper	SAFE	SAFE	SAFE	SAFE	OUT								
Horse	Nonna Grishayeva	Actress	RISK	SAFE	RISK	OUT									
Peacock	Albina Dzhanabaeva	Singer	SAFE	SAFE	OUT										
Dog	Roman Kostomarov	Figure skater	SAFE	OUT											
Bull	Shura	Singer													
Mouse	MakSim	Singer													
Bear	Igor Sarukhanov	Singer													
Cat	Alisa Mon	Singer													

The masked singer won their face-off and remained in the competition.
The masked singer lost their face-off and was in the bottom three/two, but was not eliminated.
The masked singer was safe from elimination.
The mask was a guest and was immediately unmasked after their performance.
The masked singer was eliminated from the competition and unmasked upon their elimination.
The masked singer won the competition.
The masked singer finished second.
The masked singer finished third.
The masked singer finished fourth.

=== Episodes ===
==== Week 1 (13 February) ====
Performances on the first episode
#	Stage name	Song	Identity	Result	
1	Dog	"Who Let the Dogs Out" by Baha Men	undisclosed	21,3%	SAFE
2	Octopus	"Мало половин" by Olga Buzova	undisclosed	6,6%	WIN
3	Baby	"Baby" by Justin Bieber feat. Ludacris	undisclosed	16,2%	SAFE
4	Horse	"Baila Me" by Gipsy Kings	undisclosed	36%	RISK
5	Fly Agaric	"А в Подмосковье водятся лещи" by Maya Kristalinskaya	undisclosed	19,9%	SAFE
6	Bee	"Пчеловод" by RASA	undisclosed	9,7%	SAFE
7	Joker	"Хали гали, паратрупер" by Leprikonsy	undisclosed	39,6%	SAFE
8	Donut	"Муси-пуси" by Katya Lel	undisclosed	42,5%	RISK
9	Anubis	"Роза чайная" by Philipp Kirkorov feat. Masha Rasputina	undisclosed	4,5%	SAFE
10	Leopard	"Waka Waka (This Time for Africa)" by Shakira feat. Freshlyground	undisclosed	3,7%	WIN
11	Monster	"Наш сосед" by Edita Piekha	undisclosed	44,9%	RISK
12	Peacock	"Дольче Габбана" by Verka Serduchka	undisclosed	28,3%	SAFE
13	Dragon	"WWW" by Leningrad	undisclosed	14,5%	SAFE
14	Capricorn	"Uptown Girl" by Billy Joel	undisclosed	12,3%	WIN

==== Week 2 (20 February) ====
Performances on the second episode
#	Stage name	Song	Identity	Result	
1	Fly Agaric	"Feel It Still" by Portugal. The Man	undisclosed	28,1%	RISK
2	Leopard	"Отпусти меня" by Valeriya	undisclosed	19%	SAFE
3	Donut	"Once in The Street" by Nino Katamadze	undisclosed	21,6%	SAFE
4	Monster	"Опера №2" by Vitas	undisclosed	5,2%	WIN
5	Joker	"Снег" by Philipp Kirkorov	undisclosed	26,1%	SAFE
6	Dog	"Мой друг (Лучше всех играет блюз)" by Mashina Vremeni	Roman Kostomarov	35%	OUT
7	Peacock	"Diamonds" by Rihanna	undisclosed	17,2%	SAFE
8	Dragon	"Только раз" by Boris Fomin	undisclosed	11,5%	SAFE
9	Anubis	"Only You" by Elvis Presley	undisclosed	6,4%	WIN
10	Horse	"О любви" by Chizh & Co	undisclosed	29,9%	SAFE
11	Baby	"I Put a Spell On You" by Screamin' Jay Hawkins	undisclosed	53%	RISK
12	Bee	"Life" by Zivert	undisclosed	25,5%	SAFE
13	Capricorn	"Зимний сон" by Alsou	undisclosed	4,6%	WIN
14	Octopus	"Believe" by Cher	undisclosed	17,9%	SAFE

==== Week 3 (6 March) ====
Performances on the third episode
#	Stage name	Song	Identity	Result	
1	Peacock	"Я тебя поцеловала" by Alla Pugacheva	Albina Dzhanabaeva	30,7%	OUT
2	Baby	"Расскажи, как…" by Lolita	undisclosed	18,2%	SAFE
3	Anubis	"Girl on Fire" by Alicia Keys	undisclosed	11%	WIN
4	Dragon	"Вьюга" by Grigory Leps	undisclosed	16,5%	SAFE
5	Donut	"Rolling in the Deep" by Adele	undisclosed	23,6%	SAFE
6	Monster	"Я милого узнаю по походке" by Garik Sukachov	undisclosed	10,9%	WIN
7	Leopard	"Padam, padam..." by Édith Piaf	undisclosed	40,3%	RISK
8	Capricorn	"Лизавета" by Vitaliy Vlasov	undisclosed	17,8%	SAFE
9	Joker	"Птичка" by HammAli & Navai	undisclosed	31%	SAFE
10	Octopus	"Зима в сердце" by Gosti iz Budushchego	undisclosed	13,6%	SAFE
11	Horse	"Крошка" by Monetochka	undisclosed	49,2%	RISK
12	Bee	"I'm Outta Love" by Anastacia	undisclosed	25,8%	SAFE
13	Fly Agaric	"O sole mio" by Luciano Pavarotti	undisclosed	11,4%	WIN

==== Week 4 (7 and 13 March) ====
Performances on the fourth episode
#	Stage name	Song	Identity	Result	
1	Capricorn	"Hello, Dolly!" by Louis Armstrong	undisclosed	26,9%	SAFE
2	Anubis	"Не молчи" by Dima Bilan	undisclosed	20%	SAFE
3	Octopus	"Just Dance" by Lady Gaga feat. Colby O'Donis	undisclosed	35,9%	RISK
4	Fly Agaric	"Се Ля Ви" by Valery Meladze	undisclosed	17,2%	WIN
5	Donut	"Стану ли я счастливей" by Maxim Fadeev	undisclosed	49%	RISK
6	Monster	"The Final Countdown" by Europe	undisclosed	9%	WIN
7	Leopard	"Кеды" by Bianka	undisclosed	21,3%	SAFE
8	Baby	"Scatman (Ski-Ba-Bop-Ba-Dop-Bop)" by Scatman John	undisclosed	20,7%	SAFE
9	Horse	"The Phantom of the Opera" by Andrew Lloyd Webber	Nonna Grishayeva	39,3%	OUT
10	Dragon	"Get the Party Started" by Pink	undisclosed	10,7%	WIN
11	Joker	"Орлы или Вороны" by Maxim Fadeev and Grigory Leps	undisclosed	37,1%	SAFE
12	Bee	"Отпусти меня" by Linda	undisclosed	12,9%	SAFE

Performances on the fifth episode
#	Stage name	Song	Identity	Result	
1	Monster	"Очи черные" by Vika Tsyganova	undisclosed	20%	SAFE
2	Octopus	"Навек" by Polina Gagarina	undisclosed	44,6%	RISK
3	Capricorn	"Thriller" by Michael Jackson	undisclosed	12,3%	WIN
4	Bee	"Libiamo" from La traviata / "I Love Rock 'n' Roll" by Joan Jett & the Blackhearts	undisclosed	23,1%	SAFE
5	Joker	"Это здорово" by Nikolai Noskov	Navai	40,2%	OUT
6	Leopard	"Bleeding Love" by Leona Lewis	undisclosed	19,7%	SAFE
7	Donut	"Москва Златоглавая (Конфетки-бараночки)" by Nadezhda Babkina	undisclosed	28,3%	SAFE
8	Fly Agaric	"You Can Leave Your Hat On" by Joe Cocker	undisclosed	11,8%	WIN
9	Baby	"Зурбаган" by Vladimir Presnyakov	undisclosed	45,5%	RISK
10	Dragon	"Единственная" by Philipp Kirkorov	undisclosed	22,3%	WIN
11	Anubis	"Sunny" by Boney M	undisclosed	32,2%	SAFE

==== Week 5 (20 March) ====
Performances on the sixth episode
#	Stage name	Song	Identity	Result	
1	Anubis	"Зима-холода" by Andrey Gubin	undisclosed	28,7%	SAFE
2	Fly Agaric	"Я позабыл твоё лицо" by Valery Leontiev	undisclosed	17%	WIN
3	Leopard	"Улетаю" by A'Studio	undisclosed	31%	RISK
4	Baby	"All by Myself" by Eric Carmen	undisclosed	23,3%	SAFE
5	Capricorn	"На сиреневой луне" by Leonid Agutin	undisclosed	30,6%	SAFE
6	Octopus	"Alive" by Sia	Natalia Podolskaya	47,8%	OUT
7	Donut	"Истеричка" by Artik & Asti	undisclosed	21,6%	WIN
8	Monster	"She's a Lady" by Tom Jones	undisclosed	14,4%	WIN
9	Bee	"Любовь уставших лебедей" by Dimash Qudaibergen	undisclosed	52,3%	RISK
10	Dragon	"Bad Guy" by Billie Eilish	undisclosed	33,3%	SAFE

==== Week 6 (27 March) ====
Performances on the seventh episode
#	Stage name	Song	Identity	Result	
1	Baby	"Огонь и вода" by Philipp Kirkorov	undisclosed	29,3%	SAFE
2	Leopard	"Останусь" by Gorod 312	Mari Kraimbrery	56,9%	OUT
3	Monster	"It's Now or Never" by Elvis Presley	undisclosed	13,8%	WIN
4	Donut	"Voyage, voyage" by Desireless	undisclosed	52,2%	RISK
5	Fly Agaric	"Оле, оле" by Leonid Agutin	undisclosed	27,8%	SAFE
6	Bee	"Dov'è l'amore" by Cher	undisclosed	20%	WIN
7	Dragon	"Luna" by Alessandro Safina	undisclosed	28%	WIN
8	Capricorn	"Я свободен" by Valery Kipelov	undisclosed	37,6%	RISK
9	Anubis	"You Are So Beautiful" by Joe Cocker	undisclosed	34,4%	SAFE

==== Week 7 (3 April) ====
Performances on the eighth episode
#	Stage name	Song	Identity	Result	
1	Bee	"Let's Get It Started" by Black Eyed Peas	undisclosed	17,9%	SAFE
2	Donut	"Пошлю его на..." by Lolita	undisclosed	79,5%	RISK
3	Capricorn	"Believer" by Imagine Dragons	undisclosed	2,6%	WIN
4	Baby	"Не дано" by Hi-Fi	Ruslan Alekhno	52,1%	OUT
5	Fly Agaric	"О, Боже" by Sergey Chelobanov	undisclosed	32,1%	SAFE
6	Anubis	"Without You" by Mariah Carey	undisclosed	15,8%	WIN
7	Monster	"Поздний вечер в Сорренто" by Aleksey Glyzin	undisclosed	63,4%	RISK
8	Dragon	"Je t'aime" by Lara Fabian	undisclosed	36,6%	WIN

==== Week 8 (10 April) ====
Performances on the ninth episode
#	Stage name	Song	Identity	Result	
1	Fly Agaric	"Самый лучший день" by Grigory Leps	undisclosed	33,8%	RISK
2	Anubis	"Gangsta's Paradise" by Coolio feat. L.V.	undisclosed	33,4%	SAFE
3	Dragon	"Нежность" by Maya Kristalinskaya	undisclosed	32,8%	WIN
4	Monster	"Казанова" by Valery Leontiev	undisclosed	39,4%	WIN
5	Bee	"Не надо слов" by Larisa Dolina	undisclosed	60,6%	RISK
6	Donut	"Лёгкой джазовой походкой" by Laima Vaikule	Irina Ponarovskaya	71,7%	OUT
7	Capricorn	"Знаешь ли ты" by MakSim	undisclosed	28,3%	WIN

==== Week 9 (17 April) ====
Performances on the tenth episode
#	Stage name	Song	Identity	Result
1	Hare	"Нежность моя" by Valeriya	Timur Batrutdinov	Performance for Valeriya's birthday
2	Bull	"Мал-помалу" by Alla Pugacheva	Shura	GUEST
3	Monster	"Сумасшедшая" by Alexey Vorobyov	undisclosed	RISK
4	Bee	"GoldenEye" by Tina Turner	undisclosed	WIN
5	Fly Agaric	"На меньшее я не согласен" by Nikolai Noskov	undisclosed	RISK
6	Dragon	"Roxanne" by The Police	undisclosed	WIN
7	Mouse	"Дорогой длинною" by Alexander Vertinsky	MakSim	GUEST
8	Capricorn	"Bad Habits" by Ed Sheeran	Nikita Presnyakov	OUT
9	Anubis	"Монолог" by Alla Pugacheva	undisclosed	WIN

==== Week 10 (24 April) ====
Performances on the eleventh episode
#	Stage name	Song	Identity	Result
1	Bear	"Розовое вино" by Eldzhey & Feduk	Igor Sarukhanov	GUEST
2	Fly Agaric	"How You Remind Me" by Nickelback	Evgeny Dyatlov	OUT
3	Monster	"Runaway Baby" by Bruno Mars	undisclosed	WIN
4	Bee	"Apologize" by OneRepublic and Timbaland	undisclosed	WIN
5	Cat	"Вечная любовь" by Charles Aznavour	Alisa Mon	GUEST
6	Anubis	"Fantasy" by Earth, Wind & Fire	undisclosed	RISK
7	Dragon	"Speak Softly, Love" by Andy Williams	undisclosed	WIN

==== Week 11 (1 May) ====
===== Round One =====
Performances on the final episode – round one
#	Stage name	Song	Identity	Result
1	Bee	"Иллюзия" by Philipp Kirkorov	Alsou	FINALIST
2	Dragon	"Can't Take My Eyes Off You" by Frankie Valli	undisclosed	SAFE
3	Anubis	"Там нет меня" by Igor Nikolayev	undisclosed	SAFE
4	Monster	"Постой, паровоз" by Yuri Nikulin / "We Will Rock You" by Queen / "Livin' la Vida Loca" by Ricky Martin	undisclosed	SAFE

===== Round Two =====
Performances on the final episode – round two
#	Stage name	Song	Identity	Result
1	Monster	"Bohemian Rhapsody" by Queen	Alexey Vorobyov	THIRD
2	Anubis	"Lady Marmalade" by Christina Aguilera, Lil' Kim, Mýa, Pink and Missy Elliott	Maria Zaitseva	RUNNER-UP
3	Dragon	"Мелодия" by Muslim Magomayev	Ildar Abdrazakov	WINNER

== Маска. Танцы ==
=== Contestants ===
Stage name	Celebrity	Occupation	Episodes												
Stage name	Celebrity	Occupation	1	2	3	4	5	6	7	8	9	10	11	12	
Stage name	Celebrity	Occupation	1	2	3	4	5	6	7	8	9	10	11	A	B
Zebra	Katya Adushkina	YouTuber	SAFE	WIN	SAFE	WIN	WIN	SAFE	WIN	RISK	WIN	WIN	RISK	SAFE	WINNER
Seahorse	Evgeny Papunaishvili	Choreographer	WIN	SAFE	SAFE	SAFE	SAFE	SAFE	WIN	WIN	WIN	WIN	WIN	SAFE	RUNNER-UP
Brush	DAVA	Blogger	SAFE	SAFE	WIN	SAFE	RISK	RISK	WIN	WIN	RISK	RISK	SAFE	SAFE	THIRD
Black Swan	Vladimir Marconi	Comedian	SAFE	RISK	WIN	SAFE	WIN	RISK	RISK	RISK	SAFE	WIN	WIN	FINALIST	
Scarecrow	Vyacheslav Makarov	Host of Маска	WIN	WIN	RISK	WIN	WIN	WIN	SAFE	WIN	RISK	RISK	OUT		
Frog	Karina Kross	Blogger	SAFE	SAFE	WIN	WIN	RISK	WIN	SAFE	RISK	WIN	WD (Note: Due to sustaining a broken ankle, Karina chose to withdraw from the competition.)			
Beetroot	Nataliya Medvedeva	Actress	SAFE	SAFE	SAFE	SAFE	SAFE	SAFE	RISK	WIN	OUT				
Saturn	Mitya Fomin	Singer	RISK	WIN	SAFE	SAFE	SAFE	SAFE	SAFE	OUT					
Ladybug	Anna Sedokova	Singer	SAFE	SAFE	SAFE	RISK	SAFE	WIN	OUT						
Snow Leopard	Alexander Belkovich	Chef	WIN	SAFE	SAFE	SAFE	SAFE	OUT							
Disco Ball	Rosa Syabitova	TV personality	RISK	RISK	RISK	RISK	OUT								
Viper	Anna Semenovich	Singer	RISK	SAFE	SAFE	OUT									
Owl	Anastasia Volochkova	Ballet dancer	SAFE	SAFE	OUT										
Popcorn	Shura	Singer	SAFE	OUT											
Bunny	Mari Kraimbrery	Singer													
Doll	Regina Todorenko	Singer													
Kitty	Ida Galich	TV presenter													
Monkey	Khabib	Rapper													

The masked dancer won their face-off and remained in the competition.
The masked dancer lost their face-off and was in the bottom three/two, but was not eliminated.
The masked dancer was safe from elimination.
The mask was a guest and was immediately unmasked after their performance.
The masked dancer was eliminated from the competition and unmasked upon their elimination.
The masked dancer withdrew from the competition and was unmasked.
The masked dancer won the competition.
The masked dancer finished second.
The masked dancer finished third.
The masked dancer finished fourth.

=== Episodes ===
==== Week 1 (9 October) ====
Performances on the first episode
#	Stage name	Song	Identity	Result	
1	Zebra	"Невеста" by Gluk'oZa	undisclosed	12,5%	SAFE
2	Viper	"You Can Leave Your Hat On" by Joe Cocker	undisclosed	42%	RISK
3	Brush	"Я тебя не отдам" by Serebro	undisclosed	13.4%	SAFE
4	Owl	"Насалатило" by Magicool	undisclosed	21,4%	SAFE
5	Snow Leopard	"ЧЁ ЗА ЛЕВ ЭТОТ ТИГР" by Gazan	undisclosed	10,7%	WIN
6	Frog	"Он тебя целует" by Ruki Vverkh!	undisclosed	24,1%	SAFE
7	Disco Ball	"Холодная луна" by Shura	undisclosed	28,6%	RISK
8	Black Swan	"Ворона" by Linda	undisclosed	22,3%	SAFE
9	Scarecrow	"Dance Monkey" by Tones and I	undisclosed	3,6%	WIN
10	Ladybug	"Божья коровка" by Alexander Stepin	undisclosed	21,4%	SAFE
11	Popcorn	"Любимка" by Niletto	undisclosed	28,9%	SAFE
12	Seahorse	"Дай джазу!" by MOT	undisclosed	10,8%	WIN
13	Beetroot	"Коламбия Пикчерз не представляет" by Band'Eros	undisclosed	23,4%	SAFE
14	Saturn	"Сияй" by Zivert	undisclosed	36.9%	RISK

==== Week 2 (16 October) ====
Performances on the second episode
#	Stage name	Song	Identity	Result	
1	Viper	"По барам" by Anna Asti	undisclosed	16.4%	SAFE
2	Seahorse	"Looking at You" by Nicholas Hill	undisclosed	9%	SAFE
3	Beetroot	"Levitating" by Dua Lipa feat. DaBaby	undisclosed	20,9%	SAFE
4	Disco Ball	"Punjabi Party" by Amar Anil Mohile	undisclosed	44.8%	RISK
5	Zebra	"Птичка" by HammAli & Navai	undisclosed	8.9%	WIN
6	Brush	"МАЛИНОВАЯ ЛАДА" by GAYAZOV$ BROTHER$	undisclosed	9%	SAFE
7	Popcorn	"Hallelujah, I Love Her So" by Ray Charles	Shura	43,2%	OUT
8	Ladybug	"Hey Now" by London Grammar	undisclosed	23,9%	SAFE
9	Saturn	"Опера №2" by Vitas	undisclosed	7.5%	WIN
10	Owl	"Я - то, что надо" by Valeriy Syutkin	undisclosed	16,4%	SAFE
11	Scarecrow	"Я люблю буги-вуги" from Stilyagi	undisclosed	15,8%	WIN
12	Frog	"Hot Stuff" by Donna Summer (Yuki Koyanagi Remix)	undisclosed	17.6%	SAFE
13	Black Swan	"Зацепила" by Arthur Pirozhkov	undisclosed	36,8%	RISK
14	Snow Leopard	"Седьмой лепесток" by Anton Tokarev	undisclosed	29.8%	SAFE

==== Week 3 (23 October) ====
Performances on the third episode
#	Stage name	Song	Identity	Result	
1	Saturn	"Out In Space" by Timur Rodriguez	undisclosed	16,2%	SAFE
2	Zebra	"Baianá" by Barbatuques	undisclosed	20,3%	SAFE
3	Black Swan	"Венера" by LOVANDA	undisclosed	12,2%	WIN
4	Beetroot	"Nails, Hair, Hips, Heels" by Todrick Hall	undisclosed	24,3%	SAFE
5	Scarecrow	"My Heart Will Go On" by Celine Dion	undisclosed	27%	RISK
6	Frog	"Бьёт бит" by IOWA	undisclosed	9,6%	WIN
7	Disco Ball	"Я - это ты" by Murat Nasyrov	undisclosed	41,1%	RISK
8	Seahorse	"Son De Caramelo" by Diego Cortes and Chispa Negra	undisclosed	15,1%	SAFE
9	Viper	"After Dark" by Tito & Tarantula	undisclosed	34,2%	SAFE
10	Snow Leopard	"U Can't Touch This" by MC Hammer	undisclosed	19,4%	SAFE
11	Owl	"Танцы на стёклах" by Maxim Fadeev and Linda	Anastasia Volochkova	46,3%	OUT
12	Ladybug	"Why Don't You Do Right?" by Peggy Lee	undisclosed	22,4%	SAFE
13	Brush	"Sorry" by Madonna	undisclosed	11.9%	WIN

==== Week 4 (30 October) ====
Performances on the fourth episode
#	Stage name	Song	Identity	Result	
1	Zebra	"ДИКАЯ ПУМА" by Yulianna Karaulova	undisclosed	6,4%	WIN
2	Brush	"Human" by Rag'n'Bone Man	undisclosed	31,6%	SAFE
3	Beetroot	"Если ты когда-нибудь меня простишь" by Anzhelika Varum and Leonid Agutin	undisclosed	26,6%	SAFE
4	Viper	"Солнце Монако" by Lusia Chebotina	Anna Semenovich	35,4%	OUT
5	Saturn	"Macarena" by Los del Río (Alexander Stepin Remix)	undisclosed	24,3%	SAFE
6	Frog	"Федерико Феллини" by Galibri and Mavik	undisclosed	12,2%	WIN
7	Snow Leopard	"Do You?" by TroyBoi	undisclosed	27%	SAFE
8	Disco Ball	"Татарский народный танец" (Tatar Folk Dance)	undisclosed	36,5%	RISK
9	Ladybug	"Очи чёрные" by Vika Tsyganova	undisclosed	34,2%	RISK
10	Scarecrow	"Dernière danse" by Indila	undisclosed	16,5%	WIN
11	Seahorse	"Это здорово" by Nikolai Noskov	undisclosed	19,2%	SAFE
12	Black Swan	"Seville" by Thrife	undisclosed	30,1%	SAFE

==== Week 5 (6 November) ====
Performances on the fifth episode
#	Stage name	Song	Identity	Result	
1	Zebra	"My Love is Like" by Therr Maitz	undisclosed	13%	WIN
2	Saturn	"Funkytown" by Lipps Inc.	undisclosed	16,9%	SAFE
3	Disco Ball	"Посмотри в глаза" by Natalya Vetlitskaya	Rosa Syabitova	55,8%	OUT
4	Beetroot	"Заряд" by Alexandr Styopin	undisclosed	14,3%	SAFE
5	Ladybug	"Barbie Girl" by Aqua	undisclosed	25%	SAFE
6	Brush	"Stand by Me" by Ben E. King	undisclosed	35,5%	RISK
7	Snow Leopard	"Розовое вино" by Eldzhey and Feduk	undisclosed	23,7%	SAFE
8	Black Swan	"What Is Love" by Haddaway	undisclosed	15,8%	WIN
9	Frog	"Heathens" by Twenty One Pilots	undisclosed	50,3%	RISK
10	Seahorse	"Perfect" by Ed Sheeran	undisclosed	36,8%	SAFE
11	Scarecrow	"Танцы" by The Hatters	undisclosed	11,9%	WIN

==== Week 6 (13 November) ====
Performances on the sixth episode
#	Stage name	Song	Identity	Result	
1	Brush	"It's Raining Men" by The Weather Girls	undisclosed	35,9%	RISK
2	Seahorse	"Johnny B. Goode" by Chuck Berry	undisclosed	17,9%	SAFE
3	Saturn	"No Limit (Rap Version)" by 2 Unlimited	undisclosed	29,5%	SAFE
4	Frog	"Axel F" by Crazy Frog	undisclosed	16,7%	WIN
5	Beetroot	"Wannabe" by Spice Girls	undisclosed	35%	SAFE
6	Ladybug	"О нём" by Irina Dubtsova	undisclosed	18,2%	WIN
7	Black Swan	"Bad Romance" by Lady Gaga	undisclosed	46,8%	RISK
8	Snow Leopard	"Sex Bomb" by Tom Jones and Mousse T.	Alexander Belkovich	62%	OUT
9	Scarecrow	"Пойду плясать" by Zventa Sventana	undisclosed	13,9%	WIN
10	Zebra	"Diva Dance" from The Fifth Element	undisclosed	24,1%	SAFE

==== Week 7 (20 November) ====
Performances on the seventh episode
#	Stage name	Song	Identity	Result	
1	Saturn	"Puttin' On the Ritz" by Fred Astaire (Taco Cover)	undisclosed	30,8%	SAFE
2	Beetroot	"Objection (Tango)" by Shakira	undisclosed	49,4%	RISK
3	Seahorse	"Do It to It (Extended Mix)" by Acraze feat. Cherish	undisclosed	19,8%	WIN
4	Ladybug	"Пчеловод" by RASA	Anna Sedokova	60,5%	OUT
5	Scarecrow	"Сука-любовь" by Mikhei and Jumanji	undisclosed	23,5%	SAFE
6	Brush	"That's What I Like" by Bruno Mars	undisclosed	16%	WIN
7	Black Swan	"Satisfaction" by Benny Benassi	undisclosed	51,3%	RISK
8	Frog	"Дыши" by Anet Sai and AMCHI	undisclosed	34,6%	SAFE
9	Zebra	"Cotton Eye Joe" by Rednex	undisclosed	14,1%	WIN

==== Week 8 (27 November) ====
Performances on the eighth episode
#	Stage name	Song	Identity	Result	
1	Scarecrow	"Black Betty" by Ram Jam	undisclosed	29,9%	WIN
2	Saturn	"Lordly" by Feder feat. Alex Aiono	Mitya Fomin	70.1%	OUT
3	Beetroot	"Fake" by The Tech Thieves	undisclosed	25,7%	WIN
4	Zebra	"Lone Digger" by Caravan Palace	undisclosed	74,3%	RISK
5	Brush	"Чика" by Arthur Pirozhkov	undisclosed	43,1%	WIN
6	Black Swan	"Ameno (2010 Remix)" by Era	undisclosed	56,9%	RISK
7	Frog	"Феникс" by Anna Asti	undisclosed	64.7%	RISK
8	Seahorse	"Freedom" by Pharrell Williams	undisclosed	35.3%	WIN

==== Week 9 (4 December) ====
Performances on the ninth episode
#	Stage name	Song	Identity	Result	
1	Beetroot	"Queen of the Night" by Whitney Houston	Nataliya Medvedeva	47,6%	OUT
2	Black Swan	"Ролекс" by DAVA feat. Philipp Kirkorov	undisclosed	31,7%	SAFE
3	Seahorse	"We No Speak Americano" by Yolanda Be Cool and DCUP	undisclosed	20,7%	WIN
4	Brush	"New Thang" by Redfoo	undisclosed	74,6%	RISK
5	Zebra	"El Tango de Roxanne" from Moulin Rouge!	undisclosed	25,4%	WIN
6	Scarecrow	"Mambo No.5 (A Little Bit Of...)" by Lou Bega	undisclosed	50,8%	RISK
7	Frog	"Let Me Think About It" by Ida Corr and Fedde Le Grand	undisclosed	49,2%	WIN

==== Week 10 (11 December) ====
Performances on the tenth episode
#	Stage name	Song	Identity	Result
1	Bunny	"Amore" by Mari Kraimbrery	Mari Kraimbrery	GUEST
2	Scarecrow	"Молния" by Dima Bilan	undisclosed	RISK
3	Zebra	"Back to Black" by Amy Winehouse	undisclosed	WIN
4	Seahorse	"Ночь" by Andrey Gubin	undisclosed	WIN
5	Brush	"I Like It Like That" by Pete Rodriguez	undisclosed	RISK
6	Doll	"Позвони" by DJ Smash & NIVESTA	Regina Todorenko	GUEST
7	Black Swan	"Казанова" by Valery Leontiev	undisclosed	WIN
8	Frog	"Отпустите меня в Гималаи" by Masha Rasputina	Karina Kross	WD

==== Week 11 (18 December) ====
Performances on the eleventh episode
#	Stage name	Song	Identity	Result
1	Kitty	"Kill This Love" by Blackpink	Ida Galich	GUEST
2	Brush	"Дожди" by Igor Kornelyuk	undisclosed	SAFE
3	Scarecrow	"Papaoutai" by Stromae	Vyacheslav Makarov	OUT
4	Black Swan	"7 Years" by Lukas Graham	undisclosed	WIN
5	Monkey	"Кто? Ты" by Detsl aka Le Truk	Khalib	GUEST
6	Seahorse	"Canción del Mariachi" by Antonio Banderas and Los Lobos	undisclosed	WIN
7	Zebra	"Toxic" by Britney Spears	undisclosed	RISK

==== Week 12 (25 December) ====
Group Performance: "Bloody Mary" by Lady Gaga (performed with Yuri Muzychenko)

===== Round One =====
Performances on the final episode – round one
#	Stage name	Song	Identity	Result
1	Seahorse	"Краш" by Klava Koka feat. Niletto (performed with Klava Koka)	undisclosed	SAFE
2	Zebra	"Love Is Found" by Sade	undisclosed	SAFE
3	Brush	"Turn Down for What" by DJ Snake feat. Lil Jon	undisclosed	SAFE
4	Black Swan	"Experience" by Ludovico Eiunaudi	Vladimir Marconi	FINALIST

===== Round Two =====
Performances on the final episode – round two
#	Stage name	Song	Identity	Result
1	Zebra	"Toy" by Netta	Katya Adushkina	WINNER
2	Brush	"Hey! Pachuco!" by Royal Crown Revue	DAVA	THIRD
3	Seahorse	"Хоп-хэй, лала-лэй" by Leonid Agutin	Evgeny Papunaishvili	RUNNER-UP

== Season 4 ==
=== Contestants ===
Stage name	Celebrity	Occupation	Episodes												
Stage name	Celebrity	Occupation	1	2	3	4	5	6	7	8	9	10	11	12	
Stage name	Celebrity	Occupation	1	2	3	4	5	6	7	8	9	10	11	A	B
Mammoth Cub	Dima Bilan	Singer	SAFE	SAFE	SAFE	SAFE	SAF	SAFE	WIN	WIN	SAFE	WIN	WIN	SAFE	WINNERS
Scorpion	Sergey Lazarev	Singer	SAFE	SAFE	SAFE	SAFE	WIN	SAFE	SAFE	SAFE	WIN	WIN	RISK	SAFE	WINNERS
Poodle	Lada Dance	Singer	WIN	WIN	SAFE	WIN	SAFE	WIN	WIN	SAFE	RISK	RISK	WIN	SAFE	THIRD
Mandrill	Elchin Azizov	Opera singer	WIN	SAFE	SAFE	WIN	WIN	WIN	RISK	WIN	WIN	WIN	SAFE	FINALIST	
Caterpillar	IVAN	Singer	SAFE	SAFE	WIN	SAFE	SAFE	SAFE	WIN	RISK	WIN	RISK	OUT		
Hamster	Anita Tsoy	Singer	SAFE	WIN	SAFE	SAFE	SAFE	SAFE	RISK	WIN	RISK	OUT			
Ermine	Diana Ankudinova	Singer	WIN	WIN	WIN	WIN	WIN	WIN	SAFE	RISK	OUT				
Skunk	SHENA?	Singer	SAFE	WIN	RISK	RISK	RISK	RISK	SAFE	OUT					
Raven	Vanya Dmitrienko	Singer	SAFE	SAFE	SAFE	SAFE	SAFE	RISK	OUT						
Phoenix	Victoria Dayneko	Singer	SAFE	SAFE	WIN	SAFE	RISK	OUT							
Queen of Spades	Jasmin	Singer	RISK	SAFE	RISK	RISK	OUT								
Shawarma	Evgenia Medvedeva	Figure skater	RISK	RISK	SAFE	OUT									
Fox Cub	Yana Rudkovskaya	Singer	SAFE	RISK	OUT										
Porcupine	Vadim Kazachenko	Singer	RISK	OUT											
Mummy	Yaroslav Sumishevsky	Singer													
Mouse Cub	Natasha Korolyova	Singer													
Cactus	Ida Galich	TV presenter													
Sea King	Vlad Stashevsky	Singer													
Stork	Anita Tsoy	Singer													

The masked singer won their face-off and remained in the competition.
The masked singer lost their face-off and was in the bottom three/two, but was not eliminated.
The masked singer was safe from elimination.
The mask was a guest and was immediately unmasked after their performance.
The masked singer was eliminated from the competition and unmasked upon their elimination.
The masked singer won the competition.
The masked singer finished second.
The masked singer finished third.
The masked singer finished fourth.

=== Episodes ===
==== Week 1 (12 February) ====
Performances on the first episode
#	Stage name	Song	Identity	Result	
1	Porcupine	"Ой грибы, грибочки" by Lyudmila Zykina	undisclosed	37,6%	RISK
2	Hamster	"Федерико Феллини" by Galibri & Mavik	undisclosed	10,1%	SAFE
3	Phoenix	"Мало огня" by Linda	undisclosed	13,4%	SAFE
4	Mandrill	"Sex Bomb" by Tom Jones and Mousse T.	undisclosed	7,4%	WIN
5	Fox Cub	"Лунный кот" by Natalya Vetlitskaya	undisclosed	31,5%	SAFE
6	Shawarma	"Маршрутка" by IOWA	undisclosed	35%	RISK
7	Mammoth Cub	"Песенка мамонтёнка" by Klara Rumyanova	undisclosed	21%	SAFE
8	Ermine	"Bloody Mary" by Lady Gaga	undisclosed	8,4%	WIN
9	Raven	"Научусь летать" by MakSim	undisclosed	14%	SAFE
10	Caterpillar	"Букет" by Alexander Barykin	undisclosed	21,6%	SAFE
11	Queen of Spades	"Всё могут короли" by Alla Pugacheva	undisclosed	37,8%	RISK
12	Skunk	"Моя бабушка курит трубку" by Garik Sukachov	undisclosed	34,9%	SAFE
13	Poodle	"Dance Monkey" by Tones and I	undisclosed	6,3%	WIN
14	Scorpion	"Hijo de la Luna" by Mecano	undisclosed	21%	SAFE

==== Week 2 (19 February) ====
Performances on the second episode
#	Stage name	Song	Identity	Result	
1	Caterpillar	"Песня Забавы" by Tatyana Shabelnikova	undisclosed	17,9%	SAFE
2	Porcupine	"Хорошо!" by Edita Piekha	Vadim Kazachenko	51,7%	OUT
3	Skunk	"In Your Eyes" by Kylie Minogue	undisclosed	7,6%	WIN
4	Raven	"Ай-ай-ай" by Leonid Agutin and Tomas N'evergreen	undisclosed	15,2%	SAFE
5	Poodle	"Острова" by Vladimir Presnyakov	undisclosed	7,6%	WIN
6	Queen of Spades	"Солнце Монако" by Lusia Chebotina	undisclosed	23,8%	SAFE
7	Fox Cub	"Kalimba de Luna" by Tony Esposito	undisclosed	36,4%	RISK
8	Phoenix	"You Know I'm No Good" by Amy Winehouse	undisclosed	14%	SAFE
9	Mammoth Cub	"Глупые люди" by Hi-Fi	undisclosed	16,7%	SAFE
10	Hamster	"Были танцы" by Bianka	undisclosed	9,1%	WIN
11	Scorpion	"Я падаю в небо" by Olga Kormukhina	undisclosed	18,2%	SAFE
12	Shawarma	"Невеста" by Glukoza	undisclosed	53,4%	RISK
13	Mandrill	"Пташечка моя" by Philipp Kirkorov	undisclosed	14,9%	SAFE
14	Ermine	"Скажи, не молчи" by Serebro	undisclosed	13,5%	WIN

==== Week 3 (26 February) ====
Performances on the third episode
#	Stage name	Song	Identity	Result	
1	Poodle	"Увезу тебя я в Тундру" by Kola Beldy	undisclosed	16,4%	SAFE
2	Ermine	"Всё в твоих руках" by Anzhelika Varum and Leonid Agutin	undisclosed	10,4%	WIN
3	Fox Cub	"Чао!" by Alla Pugacheva	Yana Rudkovskaya	36,6%	OUT
4	Scorpion	"Корабли" by Yulia Savicheva	undisclosed	14,9%	SAFE
5	Shawarma	"Самая лучшая" by Anzhelika Varum and Slivki	undisclosed	21,7%	SAFE
6	Queen of Spades	"Императрица" by Irina Allegrova	undisclosed	44,7%	RISK
7	Mammoth Cub	"Don't Stop the Music" by Rihanna	undisclosed	20,5%	SAFE
8	Hamster	"Пароход" by Leonid Agutin	undisclosed	31,8%	SAFE
9	Caterpillar	"Le temps des cathédrales" from Notre-Dame de Paris	undisclosed	3%	WIN
10	Skunk	"Курю" by Elena Vaenga	undisclosed	36,1%	RISK
11	Phoenix	"А у моей любви" by Alsou	undisclosed	11,3%	WIN
12	Mandrill	"Остров Невезения" by Andrei Mironov	undisclosed	30,8%	SAFE
13	Raven	"Hotel California" by Eagles	undisclosed	21,8%	SAFE

==== Week 4 (5 March) ====
Performances on the fourth episode
#	Stage name	Song	Identity	Result	
1	Hamster	"Чёрный бумер" by Seryoga	undisclosed	20,9%	SAFE
2	Skunk	"Нас не догонят" by t.A.T.u.	undisclosed	41,9%	RISK
3	Raven	"Обернитесь" by Valery Meladze and Grigory Leps	undisclosed	23,7%	SAFE
4	Ermine	"Шагай" by Polina Gagarina / "Gangnam Style" by PSY	undisclosed	13,5%	WIN
5	Shawarma	"Девушки как звезды" by Andrey Gubin	Evgenia Medvedeva	64%	OUT
6	Mandrill	"Ой, мороз, мороз" by Maria Uvarova	undisclosed	7,3%	WIN
7	Phoenix	"Cambio Dolor" by Natalia Oreiro	undisclosed	8,7%	SAFE
8	Scorpion	"Зимняя вишня" by Anzhelika Varum	undisclosed	20%	SAFE
9	Caterpillar	"Трава у дома" by Zemlyane	undisclosed	34,2%	SAFE
10	Queen of Spades	"Habanera" from Carmen	undisclosed	42,8%	RISK
11	Mammoth Cub	"I Got You (I Feel Good)" by James Brown	undisclosed	17,1%	SAFE
12	Poodle	"Грешная страсть" by A'Studio	undisclosed	5,9%	WIN

==== Week 5 (12 March) ====
Performances on the fifth episode
#	Stage name	Song	Identity	Result	
1	Hamster	"Cotton Eye Joe" by Rednex	undisclosed	30%	SAFE
2	Skunk	"Я буду всегда с тобой" by Leonid Agutin and Anzhelika Varum	undisclosed	30,7%	RISK
3	Raven	"Love the Way You Lie" by Eminem feat. Rihanna	undisclosed	25,3%	SAFE
4	Ermine	"Ты мой Бог" by Irina Ponarovskaya	undisclosed	14%	WIN
5	Queen of Spades	"Dancing Queen" by ABBA	Jasmin	54,4%	OUT
6	Poodle	"Понарошку" by Yuri Titov	undisclosed	15,4%	SAFE
7	Mandrill	"Cuban Pete" by Jim Carrey	undisclosed	8,7%	WIN
8	Caterpillar	"Мой первый день" by Olga Kormukhina	undisclosed	21,5%	SAFE
9	Phoenix	"Бумажный змей" by Alla Pugacheva	undisclosed	50,3%	RISK
10	Scorpion	"Think" by Aretha Franklin	undisclosed	19,5%	WIN
11	Mammoth Cub	"Тополиный пух" by Ivanushki International	undisclosed	30,2%	SAFE

==== Week 6 (19 March) ====
Performances on the sixth episode
#	Stage name	Song	Identity	Result	
1	Poodle	"Bad" by Michael Jackson	undisclosed	13,9%	WIN
2	Caterpillar	"Полёт на дельтаплане" by Valery Leontiev	undisclosed	31%	SAFE
3	Phoenix	"По барам" by Anna Asti	Victoria Dayneko	37,3%	OUT
4	Hamster	"Rock This Party (Everybody Dance Now)" by Bob Sinclar	undisclosed	17,8%	SAFE
5	Scorpion	"Плачу на техно" by Cream Soda & HLEB	undisclosed	38,4%	SAFE
6	Skunk	"Бьёт бит" by IOWA	undisclosed	44,4%	RISK
7	Mandrill	"You Are So Beautiful" by Joe Cocker	undisclosed	17,2%	WIN
8	Mammoth Cub	"Flower Duet" from Lakmé / "Queen of the Night" by Whitney Houston	undisclosed	37,1%	SAFE
9	Raven	"Это здорово" by Nikolay Noskov	undisclosed	44%	RISK
10	Ermine	"California Dreamin'" by Sia	undisclosed	18,9%	WIN

==== Week 7 (26 March) ====
Performances on the seventh episode
#	Stage name	Song	Identity	Result	
1	Hamster	"Кабриолет" by Leningrad / "Axel F" by Crazy Frog	undisclosed	46,2%	RISK
2	Skunk	"I Wanna Be Your Slave" by Måneskin	undisclosed	29,7%	SAFE
3	Mammoth Cub	"Выйду на улицу" by Nadezhda Kadysheva	undisclosed	24,1%	WIN
4	Poodle	"Любовь похожая на сон" by Alla Pugacheva	undisclosed	26,3%	WIN
5	Mandrill	"Ищу тебя" by Tatyana Antsyferova	undisclosed	42,3%	RISK
6	Scorpion	"Confide in Me" by Kylie Minogue	undisclosed	31,4%	SAFE
7	Ermine	"Я тебя отвоюю" by Irina Allegrova	undisclosed	30,8%	SAFE
8	Raven	"Так красиво" by Sergey Lazarev	Vanya Dmitrienko	46,3%	OUT
9	Caterpillar	"Колыбельная" by Polina Gagarina	undisclosed	22,9%	WIN

==== Week 8 (2 April) ====
Performances on the eighth episode
#	Stage name	Song	Identity	Result	
1	Skunk	"Feel Good Inc." by Gorillaz	SHENA?	50,9%	OUT
2	Scorpion	"А напоследок я скажу" by Valentina Ponomaryova	undisclosed	34,6%	SAFE
3	Hamster	"Вчера" by Alsou	undisclosed	14,5%	WIN
4	Poodle	"Океан" by Mari Kraimbrery	undisclosed	35,8%	SAFE
5	Ermine	"Sweet Dreams (Are Made of This)" by Eurythmics	undisclosed	47,5%	RISK
6	Mandrill	"Лирическая" by Vladimir Vysotsky	undisclosed	16,7%	WIN
7	Caterpillar	"Billie Jean" by Michael Jackson	undisclosed	52,6%	RISK
8	Mammoth Cub	"Barcelona" by Freddie Mercury and Montserrat Caballé	undisclosed	47,4%	WIN

==== Week 9 (9 April) ====
Performances on the ninth episode
#	Stage name	Song	Identity	Result	
1	Scorpion	"It's Raining Men" by The Weather Girls	undisclosed	15,7%	WIN
2	Ermine	"Улетай на крыльях ветра" from Prince Igor	Diana Ankudinova	64,3%	OUT
3	Mammoth Cub	"Высоко" by Yulia Savicheva	undisclosed	20%	SAFE
4	Poodle	"Blue Suede Shoes" by Elvis Presley	undisclosed	54.5%	RISK
5	Caterpillar	"О чём ты думаешь" by Alexey Vorobyov	undisclosed	45.5%	WIN
6	Hamster	"Человек дождя" by Valeriya	undisclosed	52.2%	RISK
7	Mandrill	"Ария Мистера Икс" from The Circus Princess	undisclosed	47,8%	WIN

==== Week 10 (16 April) ====
Performances on the tenth episode
#	Stage name	Song	Identity	Result
1	Mummy	"Вдоль по Питерской" by Feodor Chaliapin	Yaroslav Sumishevsky	GUEST
2	Hamster	"My Heart Will Go On" by Celine Dion	Anita Tsoy	OUT
3	Scorpion	"Знаешь ли ты" by MakSim	undisclosed	WIN
4	Poodle	"Опера №2" by Vitas	undisclosed	RISK
5	Mammoth Cub	"Try" by Pink	undisclosed	WIN
6	Mouse Cub	"Принцесса" by Elena Vaenga	Natasha Korolyova	GUEST
7	Caterpillar	"Somebody to Love" by Queen	undisclosed	RISK
8	Mandrill	"Подберу музыку" by Jaak Joala	undisclosed	WIN

==== Week 11 (23 April) ====
Performances on the eleventh episode
#	Stage name	Song	Identity	Result
1	Cactus	"Лететь" by A-mega	Ida Galich	GUEST
2	Mandrill	"Лучший город Земли" by Muslim Magomayev	undisclosed	SAFE
3	Caterpillar	"Аэропорты" by Leonid Agutin and Vladimir Presnyakov	IVAN	OUT
4	Mammoth Cub	"Writing's on the Wall" by Sam Smith	undisclosed	WIN
5	Sea King	"Комарово" by Igor Sklyar	Vlad Stashevsky	GUEST
6	Poodle	"Crazy in Love" by Beyoncé feat. Jay-Z	undisclosed	WIN
7	Scorpion	"Alejandro" by Lady Gaga	undisclosed	RISK

==== Week 12 (30 April) ====
===== Round One =====
Performances on the final episode – round one
#	Stage name	Song	Identity	Result
1	Poodle	"Bang Bang" by Jessie J, Ariana Grande and Nicki Minaj	undisclosed	SAFE
2	Mammoth Cub	"Как молоды мы были" by Alexander Gradsky	undisclosed	SAFE
3	Scorpion	"Gimme! Gimme! Gimme! (A Man After Midnight)" by ABBA	undisclosed	SAFE
4	Mandrill	"Есть только миг" by Oleg Anofriyev	Elchin Azizov	FINALIST
5	Stork	"Пусть миром правит любовь" by Philipp Kirkorov	Anita Tsoy	GUEST

===== Round Two =====
Performances on the final episode – round two
#	Stage name	Song	Identity	Result
1	Scorpion	"Зимний сад" by Alexey Glyzin	Sergey Lazarev	WINNERS
2	Mammoth Cub	"The Show Must Go On" by Queen	Dima Bilan	WINNERS
3	Poodle	"До предела" by Valeriya and Maxim Fadeev	Lada Dance	THIRD

== Season 5 ==
=== Contestants ===
Stage name	Celebrity	Occupation	Episodes												
Stage name	Celebrity	Occupation	1	2	3	4	5	6	7 (Note: The episode was postponed due to the terrorist attack at Crocus City Hall, Moscow.)	8	9	10	11	12	
Stage name	Celebrity	Occupation	1	2	3	4	5	6	7	8	9	10	11	A	B
Raccoon	Seville	Singer	SAFE	WIN	WIN	SAFE	SAFE	WIN	SAFE	RISK	WIN	WIN	WIN	SAFE	WINNER
Cat	Ani Lorak	Singer	BEST	SAFE	WIN	WIN	WIN	IMM	WIN	WIN	RISK	RISK	RISK	SAFE	RUNNER-UP
Butterfly	Lusia Chebotina	Singer	SAFE	SAFE	SAFE	SAFE	SAFE	SAFE	SAFE	SAFE	WIN	WIN	WIN	SAFE	THIRD
Zmei Gorynich	Zurab Matua, Andrey Averin & Dmitry Sorokin	Comedians	WIN	SAFE	WIN	WIN	WIN	WIN	WIN	WIN	WIN	RISK	WIN	SAFE	FINALISTS
Russian Doll	Anastasia Stotskaya	Singer	SAFE	WIN	RISK	SAFE	SAFE	SAFE	RISK	RISK	RISK	WIN	OUT		
Puppy	Denis Klyaver	Singer	WIN	SAFE	SAFE	SAFE	WIN	RISK	SAFE	WIN	SAFE	OUT			
Gorilla	Akmal'	Singer	SAFE	WIN	SAFE	WIN	SAFE	SAFE	RISK	SAFE	OUT				
Cactus	Ekaterina Ivanchikova	Singer	SAFE	SAFE	SAFE	RISK	SAFE	WIN	WIN	OUT					
Pepper	DAVA	Blogger	SAFE	RISK	SAFE	SAFE	RISK	SAFE	OUT						
Harlequin	Mia Boyka	Singer	SAFE	SAFE	SAFE	RISK	RISK	OUT							
Shark	Artem Kacher	Rapper	SAFE	RISK	SAFE	SAFE	OUT								
Merman	Stas Yarushin	Actor	SAFE	SAFE	RISK	OUT									
Moth	Nastasya Samburskaya	Actress	SAFE	SAFE	OUT										
Corn	Sergey Mayorov	Journalist	SAFE	OUT											
Baba Yaga	Anita Tsoy	Singer													
Pumpkin	Eva Polna	Singer													
Cosmonaut	Kai Metov	Singer													
Cat-2	Evgeniy Papunaishvili	Choreographer													
Barbie	Larisa Rubalskaya	Poetess													

The masked singer won their face-off and remained in the competition.
The masked singer lost their face-off and was in the bottom three/two, but was not eliminated.
The masked singer was safe from elimination.
The mask was a guest and was immediately unmasked after their performance.
The masked singer was eliminated from the competition and unmasked upon their elimination.
The masked singer won the competition.
The masked singer finished second.
The masked singer finished third.
The masked singer finished fourth.

=== Episodes ===
==== Week 1 (18 February) ====
- Guest panelist: Dima Bilan

Performances on the first episode
#	Stage name	Song	Identity	Result	
1	Pepper	"Position №2" by Kai Metov	undisclosed	11%	SAFE
2	Raccoon	"Ночной хулиган" by Dima Bilan	undisclosed	22%	SAFE
3	Puppy	"I'm Not The Only One" by Sam Smith	undisclosed	26%	WIN
4	Shark	"Морячка" by Oleg Gazmanov / "Baby Shark" by Pinkfong	undisclosed	23%	SAFE
5	Harlequin	"Hafanana" by Afric Simone	undisclosed	18%	SAFE
6	Moth	"В Кейптаунском порту" by The Barry Sisters	undisclosed	11%	SAFE
7	Gorilla	"If There's Any Justice" by Lemar	undisclosed	23%	SAFE
8	Cat	"Если добрый ты" by Alexander Kalyagin / "Hung Up" by Madonna	undisclosed	43%	BEST
9	Corn	"Over the Rainbow" by Israel Kamakawiwoʻole	undisclosed	4%	SAFE
10	Merman	"Песня Водяного" by Anatoli Papanov / "Makeba" by Jain	undisclosed	19%	SAFE
11	Cactus	"Ты горишь как огонь" by Slava Marlow / "Каким ты был" from Cossacks of the Kuban	undisclosed	32%	SAFE
12	Butterfly	"Песня министра-администратора" by Andrei Mironov	undisclosed	8%	SAFE
13	Zmei Gorynich	"Fire" by Scooter	undisclosed	39%	WIN
14	Russian Doll	"Queen of the Night aria" from The Magic Flute	undisclosed	21%	SAFE

==== Week 2 (25 February) ====
- Guest panelist: Anatoly Tsoy

Performances on the second episode
#	Stage name	Song	Identity	Result	
1	Moth	"Старшая сестра" by Tatiana Bulanova	undisclosed	23,6%	SAFE
2	Corn	"Старая мельница" by Igor Nikolayev	Sergey Mayorov	37%	OUT
3	Merman	"Oh, Pretty Woman" by Roy Orbison	undisclosed	12,6%	SAFE
4	Harlequin	"Всё равно ты будешь мой" by Aida Vedischeva	undisclosed	18,5%	SAFE
5	Raccoon	"Ain't Nobody's Business" by Ardis Fagerholm	undisclosed	8,3%	WIN
6	Gorilla	"Ночью на кухне" by Anna Asti	undisclosed	10,6%	WIN
7	Cactus	"Milord" by Édith Piaf	undisclosed	20,5%	SAFE
8	Zmei Gorynich	"Терминатор" by Leningrad	undisclosed	14,4%	SAFE
9	Cat	"Bad Romance" by Lady Gaga	undisclosed	22,7%	SAFE
10	Pepper	"Вокализ" by Eduard Khil	undisclosed	31,8%	RISK
11	Shark	"Красивое тело" by Arthur Pirozhkov	undisclosed	64,3%	RISK
12	Russian Doll	"Bad Guy" by Billie Eilish	undisclosed	6,2%	WIN
13	Puppy	"Люси" by Oleg Gazmanov	undisclosed	16,3%	SAFE
14	Butterfly	"Бабочки" by Glukoza	undisclosed	13,2%	SAFE

==== Week 3 (3 March) ====
- Guest panelist: Garik Martirosyan

Performances on the third episode
#	Stage name	Song	Identity	Result	
1	Cactus	"Не упрекай" by Zhanna Aguzarova	undisclosed	20,1%	SAFE
2	Shark	"Happy" by Pharrell Williams	undisclosed	29,5%	SAFE
3	Moth	"Мотылёк" by Oleg Gazmanov	Nastasya Samburskaya	30,2%	OUT
4	Harlequin	"The Monster" by Eminem feat. Rihanna	undisclosed	14,4%	SAFE
5	Zmei Gorynich	"Кукла" by Ivanushki International	undisclosed	5,8%	WIN
6	Pepper	"Мой мармеладный" by Katya Lel	undisclosed	25,7%	SAFE
7	Merman	"Зачем вы, девочки, красивых любите?" by Nina Sazonova	undisclosed	51,4%	RISK
8	Butterfly	"Посмотри в глаза" by Natalya Vetlitskaya / "Beverly Hills" by Zivert	undisclosed	12,8%	SAFE
9	Cat	"О, Боже, какой мужчина" by Natali / "Satisfaction" by Benny Benassi	undisclosed	10,1%	WIN
10	Puppy	"Don't Dream It's Over" by Crowded House	undisclosed	26,6%	SAFE
11	Russian Doll	"В космосе" by Serebro	undisclosed	41,6%	RISK
12	Gorilla	"All of Me" by John Legend	undisclosed	18,2%	SAFE
13	Raccoon	"Плачь и смотри" by Nepara	undisclosed	13,6%	WIN

==== Week 4 (8 and 10 March) ====
- Guest panelist: Alexey Vorobyov

Performances on the fourth episode
#	Stage name	Song	Identity	Result	
1	Butterfly	"Виновата ли я" by Nadezhda Kadysheva	undisclosed	24,8%	SAFE
2	Pepper	"Let's Twist Again" by Chubby Checker	undisclosed	22,1%	SAFE
3	Harlequin	"Пряталась в ванной" by Mari Kraimbrery	undisclosed	37,9%	RISK
4	Gorilla	"Транзитный пассажир" by Irina Allegrova	undisclosed	15,2%	WIN
5	Cactus	"Ты беспощадна" by JONY	undisclosed	35,9%	RISK
6	Raccoon	"Chandelier" by Sia	undisclosed	22,7%	SAFE
7	Shark	"Dicitencello Vuje" by Enzo Fusco	undisclosed	33,1%	SAFE
8	Zmei Gorynich	"Stayin' Alive" by Bee Gees	undisclosed	8,3%	WIN
9	Merman	"Let Me Entertain You" by Robbie Williams	Stas Yarushin	40,9%	OUT
10	Puppy	"Многоточия" by Zivert	undisclosed	16,8%	SAFE
11	Russian Doll	"Абсент" by Elena Vaenga	undisclosed	35,6%	SAFE
12	Cat	"Memory" from Cats	undisclosed	6,7%	WIN

- Guest panelist: Timur Batrutdinov

Performances on the fifth episode
#	Stage name	Song	Identity	Result	
1	Pepper	"18 мне уже" by Ruki Vverh!	undisclosed	32,2%	RISK
2	Butterfly	"Eye of the Tiger" by Survivor	undisclosed	26,3%	SAFE
3	Raccoon	"Чёрно-белый цвет" by Valeriya	undisclosed	31,3%	SAFE
4	Cat	"Танцы" by Andrey Gubin	undisclosed	10,2%	WIN
5	Russian Doll	"Dark Horse" by Katy Perry	undisclosed	27,5%	SAFE
6	Shark	"Я тебя люблю" by Nikolai Noskov	Artem Kacher	32,8%	OUT
7	Cactus	"All That She Wants" by Ace of Base	undisclosed	29%	SAFE
8	Puppy	"Лондон, гуд бай" by Car-Man	undisclosed	10,7%	WIN
9	Gorilla	"Седьмой лепесток" by Hi-Fi	undisclosed	32,2%	SAFE
10	Harlequin	"Something's Got a Hold on Me" by Etta James	undisclosed	54,6%	RISK
11	Zmei Gorynich	"Nessun dorma" by Giacomo Puccini	undisclosed	13,2%	WIN

==== Week 5 (17 March) ====
- Guest panelist: Sergey Lazarev

Performances on the sixth episode
#	Stage name	Song	Identity	Result	
1	Russian Doll	"Мохнатый шмель" by Nikita Mikhalkov	undisclosed	24%	SAFE
2	Gorilla	"Половина сердца" by Leonid Agutin	undisclosed	15,3%	SAFE
3	Harlequin	"Странник" by Irina Allegrova	Mia Boyka	52%	OUT
4	Zmei Gorynich	"Лесник" by Korol i Shut	undisclosed	8,7%	WIN
5	Butterfly	"Телефонная книжка" by Larisa Dolina	undisclosed	38%	SAFE
6	Puppy	"Funiculì, Funiculà" by Luigi Denza	undisclosed	48,9%	RISK
7	Raccoon	"One Night Only" by Jennifer Holliday	undisclosed	13,1%	WIN
8	Cactus	"A Little Party Never Killed Nobody (All We Got)" by Fergie, Q-Tip and GoonRock	undisclosed	13,6%	WIN
9	Pepper	"По полюшку" by Lyubov Uspenskaya	undisclosed	41,4%	SAFE
10	Cat	"(You Make Me Feel Like) A Natural Woman" by Aretha Franklin	undisclosed	45%	IMM

==== Week 6 (31 March) ====
- Guest panelist: Aleksandr Revva

Performances on the seventh episode
#	Stage name	Song	Identity	Result	
1	Butterfly	"Девочка, танцуй" by Artik & Asti	undisclosed	38,5%	SAFE
2	Pepper	"О нём" by Irina Dubtsova	DAVA	39,6%	OUT
3	Cactus	"Отпускаю" by MakSim	undisclosed	21,9%	WIN
4	Baba Yaga	"Частушки Бабок-Ёжек" from The Flying Ship	Anita Tsoy	GUEST	
5	Russian Doll	"Money, Money, Money" by ABBA	undisclosed	63,2%	RISK
6	Puppy	"Let Me Think About It" by Ida Corr feat. Fedde Le Grand / "Соловушка" by Belyy Den'	undisclosed	25,3%	SAFE
7	Cat	"Earth Song" by Michael Jackson	undisclosed	11,5%	WIN
8	Gorilla	"Ain't No Sunshine" by Bill Withers	undisclosed	45,9%	RISK
9	Raccoon	"Паранойя" by Nikolai Noskov	undisclosed	39,8%	SAFE
10	Zmei Gorynich	"Конь" by Lyube	undisclosed	14,3%	WIN

==== Week 7 (7 April) ====
- Guest panelist: Larisa Dolina

Performances on the eighth episode
#	Stage name	Song	Identity	Result	
1	Cactus	"Вою на луну" by Nyusha	Ekaterina Ivanchikova	36,8%	OUT
2	Puppy	"Every Breath You Take" by The Police	undisclosed	27,4%	WIN
3	Butterfly	"Любовь – волшебная страна" by Valentina Ponomaryova	undisclosed	35,8%	SAFE
4	Gorilla	"Мадонна" by Aleksander Serov	undisclosed	32,3%	SAFE
5	Russian Doll	"Любовь и одиночество" by Larisa Dolina	undisclosed	56,7%	RISK
6	Cat	"Водопадом" by Grigory Leps	undisclosed	11%	WIN
7	Zmei Gorynich	"Wannabe" by Spice Girls	undisclosed	29,4%	WIN
8	Raccoon	"I Put a Spell on You" by Annie Lennox	undisclosed	70,6%	RISK

==== Week 8 (14 April) ====
- Guest panelist: Stas Piekha

Performances on the ninth episode
#	Stage name	Song	Identity	Result	
1	Raccoon	"Бросай" by Yolka	undisclosed	13,9%	WIN
2	Puppy	"Свет в твоём окне" by Alsou	undisclosed	38,3%	SAFE
3	Russian Doll	"Выше" by Nyusha	undisclosed	47,8%	RISK
4	Gorilla	"Just the Way You Are" by Bruno Mars	Akmal'	63,8%	OUT
5	Zmei Gorynich	"Ты сделана из огня" by Vadim Uslanov	undisclosed	36,2%	WIN
6	Butterfly	"Fashion Girl" by A'Studio / "Lady Marmalade" by Christina Aguilera, Lil' Kim, Mýa, Pink and Missy Elliott	undisclosed	47,6%	WIN
7	Cat	"Февраль" by Leonid Agutin and Anzhelika Varum	undisclosed	52,4%	RISK

==== Week 9 (21 April) ====
- Guest panelist: Kirill Turichenko

Performances on the tenth episode
#	Stage name	Song	Identity	Result
1	Pumpkin	"А он мне нравится" by Anna German	Eva Polna	GUEST
2	Cat	"Believer" by Imagine Dragons	undisclosed	RISK
3	Russian Doll	"Серые глаза" by Irina Saltykova	undisclosed	WIN
4	Puppy	"I Want It That Way" by Backstreet Boys	Denis Klyaver	OUT
5	Butterfly	"River" by Bishop Briggs	undisclosed	WIN
6	Cosmonaut	"Голая" by Gradusy	Kai Metov	GUEST
7	Raccoon	"Я не отступлю" by Bianka	undisclosed	WIN
8	Zmei Gorynich	"The Final Countdown" by Europe	undisclosed	RISK

==== Week 10 (28 April) ====
- Guest panelist: Elchin Azizov

Performances on the eleventh episode
#	Stage name	Song	Identity	Result
1	Cat-2	"Мальчик хочет в Тамбов" by Murat Nasyrov	Evgeniy Papunaishvili	GUEST
2	Cat	"What a Wonderful World" by Louis Armstrong	undisclosed	RISK
3	Butterfly	"Навек" by Polina Gagarina	undisclosed	WIN
4	Raccoon	"Stronger (What Doesn't Kill You)" by Kelly Clarkson	undisclosed	WIN
5	Barbie	"Течёт ручей" by Nadezhda Kadysheva	Larisa Rubalskaya	GUEST
6	Russian Doll	"Nothing Compares 2 U" by Sinéad O'Connor	Anastasia Stotskaya	OUT
7	Zmei Gorynich	"Euphoria" by Loreen	undisclosed	WIN

==== Week 11 (5 May) ====
- Guest panelists: Dima Bilan and Sergey Lazarev

===== Round One =====
Performances on the final episode – round one
#	Stage name	Song	Identity	Result
1	Butterfly	"Flowers" by Miley Cyrus	undisclosed	SAFE
2	Cat	"Любовь настала" by Roza Rymbayeva	undisclosed	SAFE
3	Zmei Gorynich	"I'm Still Standing" by Elton John	undisclosed	SAFE
4	Raccoon	"I Surrender" by Celine Dion	undisclosed	SAFE

===== Round Two =====
Performances on the final episode – round two
#	Stage name	Song	Identity	Result
1	Raccoon	"Мама, я танцую" by #2Mashi	Seville	WINNER
2	Zmei Gorynich	"Верни мне музыку" by Muslim Magomayev	Zurab Matua, Andrey Averin & Dmitry Sorokin	FINALISTS
3	Cat	"I Have Nothing" by Whitney Houston	Ani Lorak	RUNNER-UP
4	Butterfly	"В самое сердце" by Sergey Lazarev	Lusia Chebotina	THIRD

== Season 6 ==
=== Contestants ===
Stage name	Celebrity	Occupation	Episodes												
Stage name	Celebrity	Occupation	1	2	3	4	5	6	7	8	9	10	11	12	
Stage name	Celebrity	Occupation	1	2	3	4	5	6	7	8	9	10	11	A	B
Chief	Aleksandr Panayotov	Singer	SAFE	WIN	SAFE	SAFE	RISK	WIN	SAFE	WIN	WIN	WIN	WIN	SAFE	WINNER
Dalmatian	Mona	Singer	SAFE	SAFE	WIN	WIN	SAFE	SAFE	RISK	RISK	WIN	WIN	RISK	SAFE	RUNNER-UP
Falcon	Aleksey Goman	Singer	BEST	WIN	WIN	SAFE	SAFE	WIN	WIN	WIN	IMM	WIN	WIN	SAFE	THIRD
Boxer	Zhan Milimerov	Singer	SAFE	RISK	SAFE	SAFE	WIN	RISK	WIN	RISK	WIN	RISK	SAFE	FINALIST	
Ostrich	Evelina Bledans	Actress	WIN	SAFE	SAFE	SAFE	SAFE	SAFE	SAFE	SAFE	RISK	RISK	OUT (Note: Ostrich was eliminated in Episode 11, with her unmasking left as a cliffhanger for the season finale.)		
Duck	Eva Vlasova	Singer	SAFE	SAFE	RISK	WIN	SAFE	SAFE	SAFE	SAFE	SAFE	OUT			
Cucumber	Seryoga	Rapper	SAFE	RISK	SAFE	WIN	WIN	WIN	WIN	WIN	OUT				
Perch	Yaroslav Sumishevsky	Singer	WIN	SAFE	WIN	SAFE	SAFE	RISK	RISK	OUT					
Bull	VladiMir	Singer	SAFE	SAFE	SAFE	RISK	WIN	SAFE	OUT						
Mantis	Olga Seryabkina	Singer	SAFE	SAFE	SAFE	SAFE	RISK	OUT							
Chick	Aleksandr Revva	Comedian	SAFE	WIN	SAFE	RISK	OUT								
Little Sheep	Kseniya Borodina	Presenter	SAFE	SAFE	RISK	OUT									
Capybara	Eldar Dzharakhov	Blogger	SAFE	SAFE	OUT										
Little Cow	Agata Muceniece	Actress	SAFE	OUT											
Tink the Cat	Timur Batrutdinov	Comedian													
Shonya the Raccoon	Dmitry Guberniev	TV presenter													
Stepashka the Rabbit	Oxana Fedorova	TV presenter													

The masked singer won their face-off and remained in the competition.
The masked singer lost their face-off and was in the bottom three/two, but was not eliminated.
The masked singer was safe from elimination.
The mask was a guest and was immediately unmasked after their performance.
The masked singer was eliminated from the competition and unmasked upon their elimination.
The masked singer won the competition.
The masked singer finished second.
The masked singer finished third.
The masked singer finished fourth.

=== Episodes ===
==== Week 1 (9 February) ====
Performances on the first episode
#	Stage name	Song	Identity	Result	
1	Boxer	"Ты, ты, ты" by Philipp Kirkorov	undisclosed	9,9%	SAFE
2	Little Cow	"...Baby One More Time" by Britney Spears	undisclosed	21,7%	SAFE
3	Capybara	"Всё, что в жизни есть у меня" by Samotsvety	undisclosed	10,9%	SAFE
4	Duck	"Paparazzi" by Lady Gaga	undisclosed	23,8%	SAFE
5	Perch	"Царица" by Anna Asti	undisclosed	33,7%	WIN
6	Bull	"Grenade" by Bruno Mars	undisclosed	23,1%	SAFE
7	Little Sheep	"Бедная овечка" by Alyona Sviridova	undisclosed	13,7%	SAFE
8	Falcon	"Always" by Bon Jovi	undisclosed	31,6%	BEST
9	Mantis	"Jimmy Jimmy Jimmy Aaja" by Parvati Khan and Vijay Benedict	undisclosed	6,8%	SAFE
10	Cucumber	"Сердце" by Leonid Utesov	undisclosed	24,8%	SAFE
11	Chick	"Остров" by Leonid Agutin	undisclosed	19,6%	SAFE
12	Chief	"Waka Waka (This Time for Africa)" by Shakira feat. Freshlyground	undisclosed	25,5%	SAFE
13	Ostrich	"Птица счастья" by Nikolay Gnatyuk	undisclosed	29,4%	WIN
14	Dalmatian	"Mercy" by Duffy	undisclosed	25,5%	SAFE

==== Week 2 (16 February) ====
Performances on the second episode
#	Stage name	Song	Identity	Result	
1	Cucumber	"WWW" by Leningrad	undisclosed	22,6%	RISK
2	Dalmatian	"Castle in the Snow" by Kadebostany	undisclosed	21,9%	SAFE
3	Bull	"Я просто люблю тебя" by Dima Bilan	undisclosed	19,9%	SAFE
4	Little Sheep	"Младший лейтенант" by Irina Allegrova	undisclosed	19,2%	SAFE
5	Chick	"Ничего не говори" by Rok-Ostrova	undisclosed	16,4%	WIN
6	Capybara	"Moscow Calling" by Gorky Park	undisclosed	19,6%	SAFE
7	Little Cow	"Три Дня Любви" by Zivert	Agata Muceniece	23,9%	OUT
8	Chief	"Can't Get You Out of My Head" by Kylie Minogue	undisclosed	17,7%	WIN
9	Duck	"Маленький самолёт" by Valeriya	undisclosed	18%	SAFE
10	Perch	"Эй, красотка!" by Vladimir Kuzmin	undisclosed	20,8%	SAFE
11	Boxer	"Together Forever" by Rick Astley	undisclosed	52,2%	RISK
12	Mantis	"Королева" by Leonid Agutin and Anzhelika Varum	undisclosed	32,4%	SAFE
13	Falcon	"Летели недели" by Slivki	undisclosed	6,6%	WIN
14	Ostrich	"Чё те надо?" by Balagan Limited	undisclosed	8,8%	SAFE

==== Week 3 (23 February) ====
Performances on the third episode
#	Stage name	Song	Identity	Result	
1	Capybara	"Уходило лето" by Leysya Pesnya	Eldar Dzharakhov	32,2%	OUT
2	Mantis	"I Like It" by Cardi B, Bad Bunny and J Balvin	undisclosed	16,1%	SAFE
3	Falcon	"Смотри" by Polina Gagarina	undisclosed	11,1%	WIN
4	Chick	"Rock DJ" by Robbie Williams	undisclosed	16,9%	SAFE
5	Chief	"Моя бабушка курит трубку" by Garik Sukachov	undisclosed	23,7%	SAFE
6	Duck	"Don't Speak" by No Doubt	undisclosed	33,3%	RISK
7	Cucumber	"Батарейка" by Zhuki	undisclosed	24,6%	SAFE
8	Dalmatian	"Синие лебеди" by Natasha Korolyova	undisclosed	18,4%	WIN
9	Ostrich	"Habanera" from Carmen	undisclosed	23,7%	SAFE
10	Little Sheep	"Пропадаю я" by Lyubov Uspenskaya	undisclosed	34,9%	RISK
11	Boxer	"Она не твоя" by Stas Piekha and Grigory Leps	undisclosed	28,4%	SAFE
12	Bull	"A Little Party Never Killed Nobody (All We Got)" by Fergie, Q-Tip and GoonRock	undisclosed	23,9%	SAFE
13	Perch	"Баллада Атоса" from D'Artagnan and Three Musketeers	undisclosed	12,8%	WIN

==== Week 4 (2 March) ====
Performances on the fourth episode
#	Stage name	Song	Identity	Result	
1	Cucumber	"Свадьба" by Muslim Magomayev	undisclosed	7,8%	WIN
2	Chick	"Rock This Party (Everybody Dance Now)" by Bob Sinclar	undisclosed	50%	RISK
3	Ostrich	"Пташечка моя" by Philipp Kirkorov / "Dance of the Little Swans" from Swan Lake	undisclosed	12,8%	SAFE
4	Falcon	"I'm a Believer" by Smash Mouth	undisclosed	29,4%	SAFE
5	Bull	"Трава у дома" by Zemlyane	undisclosed	30,6%	RISK
6	Dalmatian	"Tous les mêmes" by Stromae	undisclosed	13,8%	WIN
7	Boxer	"Чёрный бумер" by Seryoga	undisclosed	27,8%	SAFE
8	Mantis	"Can't Feel My Face" by The Weeknd	undisclosed	27,8%	SAFE
9	Little Sheep	"Лёха" by Alyona Apina	Kseniya Borodina	43,6%	OUT
10	Perch	"Только" by Nyusha	undisclosed	20,9%	SAFE
11	Duck	"Сопрано" by Mot feat. Ani Lorak	undisclosed	17,3%	WIN
12	Chief	"Тучи" by Ivanushki International	undisclosed	18,2%	SAFE

==== Week 5 (9 March) ====
Performances on the fifth episode
#	Stage name	Song	Identity	Result	
1	Perch	"Livin' la Vida Loca" by Ricky Martin	undisclosed	28,2%	SAFE
2	Chick	"Лететь" by A-mega	Aleksandr Revva	35,9%	OUT
3	Duck	"Holding Out for a Hero" by Bonnie Tyler	undisclosed	18,8%	SAFE
4	Boxer	"До предела" by Valeriya and Maxim Fadeev	undisclosed	17,1%	WIN
5	Falcon	"Бумажный змей" by Alla Pugacheva	undisclosed	32,2%	SAFE
6	Mantis	"Экспонат" by Leningrad	undisclosed	33,9%	RISK
7	Bull	"Despacito" by Luis Fonsi feat. Daddy Yankee	undisclosed	15,3%	WIN
8	Ostrich	"Танго Тайна" by Leonid Utesov	undisclosed	18,6%	SAFE
9	Chief	"You Are So Beautiful" by Joe Cocker	undisclosed	63,6%	RISK
10	Cucumber	"Gangnam Style" by PSY	undisclosed	15,3%	WIN
11	Dalmatian	"Опера №2" by Vitas	undisclosed	21,1%	SAFE

==== Week 6 (16 March) ====
Performances on the sixth episode
#	Stage name	Song	Identity	Result	
1	Mantis	"Everybody (Backstreet's Back)" by Backstreet Boys	Olga Seryabkina	41%	OUT
2	Bull	"Хоп-хэй, лала-лэй" by Leonid Agutin	undisclosed	36,8%	SAFE
3	Duck	"Больно" by Nyusha	undisclosed	15,4%	SAFE
4	Cucumber	"Дарите женщинам цветы" by Jazzdauren	undisclosed	6,8%	WIN
5	Dalmatian	"Пообещайте мне любовь" by Tatyana Daskovskaya	undisclosed	34,1%	SAFE
6	Boxer	"Change the World" by Eric Clapton	undisclosed	56,1%	RISK
7	Falcon	"Per Te" by Josh Groban	undisclosed	9,8%	WIN
8	Perch	"Атлантида" by Philipp Kirkorov	undisclosed	55,4%	RISK
9	Ostrich	"Мне так повезло" by Mari Kraimbrery	undisclosed	24%	SAFE
10	Chief	"Была любовь" by Valeriya	undisclosed	20,6%	WIN

==== Week 7 (23 March) ====
Performances on the seventh episode
#	Stage name	Song	Identity	Result	
1	Duck	"Я за тебя умру" by Philipp Kirkorov	undisclosed	42,6%	SAFE
2	Bull	"Arcade" by Duncan Laurence	VladiMir	45,2%	OUT
3	Falcon	"Я тебе не верю" by Grigory Leps and Irina Allegrova	undisclosed	12,2%	WIN
4	Dalmatian	"Back to Black" by Amy Winehouse	undisclosed	55,1%	RISK
5	Cucumber	"18 мне уже" by Ruki Vverh!	undisclosed	22%	WIN
6	Chief	"Caruso" by Lucio Dalla	undisclosed	22,9%	SAFE
7	Ostrich	"Про лето" by Bianka	undisclosed	27,3%	SAFE
8	Perch	"Pretty Fly (For a White Guy)" by The Offspring	undisclosed	49,6%	RISK
9	Boxer	"Занавес" by Irina Allegrova	undisclosed	23,1%	WIN

==== Week 8 (30 March) ====
Performances on the eighth episode
#	Stage name	Song	Identity	Result	
1	Boxer	"Eye of the Tiger" by Survivor	undisclosed	45,6%	RISK
2	Duck	"Верю в тебя" by Anna Asti	undisclosed	32,5%	SAFE
3	Cucumber	"Я свободен!" by Valery Kipelov	undisclosed	21,9%	WIN
4	Perch	"Зачем тебе любовь моя?" by Alexey Chumakov	Yaroslav Sumishevsky	64,8%	OUT
5	Falcon	"Странные танцы" by Technology	undisclosed	8%	WIN
6	Ostrich	"Если в сердце живёт любовь" by Yulia Savicheva	undisclosed	27,2%	SAFE
7	Dalmatian	"Abracadabra" by Lady Gaga	undisclosed	54,5%	RISK
8	Chief	"Lose Control" by Teddy Swims	undisclosed	45,5%	WIN

==== Week 9 (6 April) ====
Performances on the ninth episode
#	Stage name	Song	Identity	Result	
1	Cucumber	"Чёрные глаза" by Oskars Stroks / "Очи чёрные" by Feodor Chaliapin	Seryoga	42,9%	OUT
2	Duck	"Обезоружена" by Polina Gagarina	undisclosed	29,8%	SAFE
3	Chief	"Синяя вечность" by Muslim Magomayev	undisclosed	26,3%	WIN
4	Ostrich	"Любимка" by Niletto	undisclosed	66,1%	RISK
5	Boxer	"Там нет меня" by Igor Nikolayev	undisclosed	33,9%	WIN
6	Falcon	"Russian Roulette" by Rihanna	undisclosed	56%	IMM
7	Dalmatian	"Одно и то же" by IOWA	undisclosed	44%	WIN

==== Week 10 (13 April) ====
Performances on the tenth episode
#	Stage name	Song	Identity	Result
1	Dalmatian	"Ты меня любишь" by Aleksander Serov	undisclosed	WIN
2	Boxer	"Crazy" by Gnarls Barkley	undisclosed	RISK
3	Ostrich	"Валенки" (Russian Folk Song)	undisclosed	RISK
4	Chief	"The Best" by Tina Turner	undisclosed	WIN
5	Tink the Cat	"Money, Money, Money" by ABBA	Timur Batrutdinov	GUEST
6	Duck	"секунду назад" by Nochnye Snaipery	Eva Vlasova	OUT
7	Falcon	"С любимыми не расставайтесь" from The Irony of Fate	undisclosed	WIN

==== Week 11 (20 April) ====
Performances on the eleventh episode
#	Stage name	Song	Identity	Result
1	Ostrich	"Улыбайся" by IOWA	Evelina Bledans	OUT
2	Falcon	"Отпусти меня" by Valeriya	undisclosed	WIN
3	Boxer	"Это здорово" by Nikolai Noskov	undisclosed	SAFE
4	Shonya the Raccoon	"Альбатрос" by Kris Kelmi and Rok Atelye	Dmitry Guberniev	GUEST
5	Dalmatian	"Try" by Pink	undisclosed	RISK
6	Chief	"Я позабыл твоё лицо" by Valery Leontiev	undisclosed	WIN
7	Stepashka the Rabbit	"Adagio" by Lara Fabian	Oxana Fedorova	GUEST

==== Week 12 (27 April) ====
===== Round One =====
Performances on the final episode – round one
#	Stage name	Song	Identity	Result
1	Boxer	"September" by Earth, Wind & Fire	Zhan Milimerov	FINALIST
2	Chief	"Любовь уставших лебедей" by Dimash Qudaibergen	undisclosed	SAFE
3	Dalmatian	"Enemy" by Imagine Dragons and JID	undisclosed	SAFE
4	Falcon	"Я эту жизнь тебе отдам" by Philipp Kirkorov	undisclosed	SAFE

===== Round Two =====
Performances on the final episode – round two
#	Stage name	Song	Identity	Result
1	Falcon	"Set Fire to the Rain" by Adele	Aleksey Goman	THIRD
2	Dalmatian	"Колыбельная" by Polina Gagarina	Mona	RUNNER-UP
3	Chief	"Earth Song" by Michael Jackson	Aleksandr Panayotov	WINNER

== Season 7 ==
=== Contestants ===
Stage name	Celebrity	Occupation													
Stage name	Celebrity	Occupation	1	2	3	4	5	6	7	8	9	10	11	12	
Stage name	Celebrity	Occupation	1	2	3	4	5	6	7	8	9	10	11	A	B
Giraffe	Polina Gagarina	Singer	WIN	WIN	SAFE	WIN	WIN	SAFE	SAFE	WIN	SAFE	WIN	WIN	SAFE	WINNER
Beaver	Dmitriy Zhuravlyov	Actor	WIN	WIN	WIN	SAFE	SAFE	WIN	WIN	WIN	WIN	WIN	SAFE	SAFE	RUNNER-UP
Meerkat	SOCRAT	Singer	BEST	WIN	WIN	WIN	SAFE	WIN	SAFE	WIN	IMM	WIN	RISK	SAFE	THIRD
Frog	Alexandra Ursuliak	Actress	SAFE	SAFE	SAFE	SAFE	WIN	SAFE	RISK	SAFE	RISK	RISK	WIN	FINALIST	
Moon	Aleksandra Vorobyova	Singer	SAFE	SAFE	SAFE	WIN	WIN	SAFE	WIN	RISK	WIN	RISK	OUT		
Hummingbird	Zara	Singer	SAFE	SAFE	RISK	SAFE	SAFE	RISK	RISK	RISK	WIN	OUT			
Bullfinch	Arseniy Borodin	Singer	SAFE	SAFE	RISK	SAFE	RISK	SAFE	SAFE	SAFE	OUT				
Hippo	Rodion Gazmanov	Singer	SAFE	RISK	SAFE	SAFE	SAFE	WIN	WIN	OUT					
Fox	Margarita Sukhankina	Singer	SAFE	SAFE	SAFE	SAFE	RISK	RISK	OUT						
Ram	Andrey Norkin	Journalist	SAFE	SAFE	WIN	RISK	SAFE	OUT							
Coral	Katya Lel	Singer	SAFE	RISK	SAFE	RISK	OUT								
Bogatyr	Ilya Zudin	Musician	SAFE	SAFE	SAFE	OUT									
Beetle	Dmitri Tarasov	Footballer	SAFE	SAFE	OUT										
Dandelion	Rosa Syabitova	TV personality	SAFE	OUT											
Kolobok	Sergey Lazarev	Singer													
Tomato	Aleksandr Revva	Comedian													
Double Bass	Iosif Prigozhin	Producer													
Clown	Viktor Saltykov	Singer													
Push	Stas Yarushin	Actor													

The masked singer won their face-off and remained in the competition.
The masked singer lost their face-off and was in the bottom three/two, but was not eliminated.
The masked singer was safe from elimination.
The mask was a guest and was immediately unmasked after their performance.
The masked singer was eliminated from the competition and unmasked upon their elimination.
The masked singer won the competition.
The masked singer finished second.
The masked singer finished third.
The masked singer finished fourth.

=== Episodes ===
==== Week 1 (8 February) ====
Performances on the first episode
#	Stage name	Song	Identity	Result	
1	Kolobok	"Пикачу" by Egor Ship feat. Mia Boyka	Sergey Lazarev	Invited panelist	
2	Dandelion	"Мама Люба" by Serebro	undisclosed	8,9%	SAFE
3	Ram	"Mambo No. 5 (A Little Bit Of...)" by Lou Bega	undisclosed	16,4%	SAFE
4	Frog	"Мой ненаглядный" by Tatiana Bulanova / "Axel F" by Crazy Frog	undisclosed	18,5%	SAFE
5	Bullfinch	"Снегири" by Sergei Trofimov	undisclosed	5,5%	SAFE
6	Giraffe	"Gangsta's Paradise" by Coolio feat. L.V.	undisclosed	50,7%	WIN
7	Coral	"Let's Get Loud" by Jennifer Lopez	undisclosed	5,8%	SAFE
8	Beetle	"Батарейка" by Zhuki	undisclosed	11,5%	SAFE
9	Hippo	"Wannabe" by Spice Girls	undisclosed	14,4%	SAFE
10	Meerkat	"Цвет настроения синий" by Philipp Kirkorov	undisclosed	45,3%	BEST
11	Moon	"Hijo de la Luna" by Mecano	undisclosed	23%	SAFE
12	Fox	"Venus" by Shocking Blue	undisclosed	10,9%	SAFE
13	Bogatyr	"Не валяй дурака, Америка!" by Lyube	undisclosed	16,8%	SAFE
14	Hummingbird	"Love the Way You Lie" by Eminem feat. Rihanna	undisclosed	15,4%	SAFE
15	Beaver	"Бобр" by SLAVA SKRIPKA	undisclosed	56,9%	WIN

==== Week 2 (15 February) ====
Performances on the second episode
#	Stage name	Song	Identity	Result	
1	Bogatyr	"Сказочная тайга" by Agatha Christie	undisclosed	18,6%	SAFE
2	Dandelion	"Сигма Бой" by Betsy & Maria Iankovskaia	Rosa Syabitova	67,1%	OUT
3	Ram	"Девчонки полюбили не меня" by Leprikonsy	undisclosed	4,3%	SAFE
4	Moon	"Знак Водолея" by Vintage	undisclosed	7,1%	SAFE
5	Beaver	"Can't Stop the Feeling!" by Justin Timberlake	undisclosed	2,9%	WIN
6	Beetle	"Чужие губы" by Ruki Vverh!	undisclosed	16,9%	SAFE
7	Coral	"Ты где-то" by Gosti iz budushego	undisclosed	41,2%	RISK
8	Bullfinch	"Как молоды мы были" by Alexander Gradsky	undisclosed	24,3%	SAFE
9	Hummingbird	"Я родилась в Сибири" by Masha Rasputina	undisclosed	10,3%	SAFE
10	Giraffe	"Оле-Оле" by Leonid Agutin	undisclosed	7,3%	WIN
11	Fox	"За бывшего" by Lusya Chebotina	undisclosed	35,5%	SAFE
12	Frog	"Lady Marmalade" by Christina Aguilera, Lil' Kim, Mýa, P!nk & Missy Elliott	undisclosed	13,8%	SAFE
13	Hippo	"I Like to Move It" by Reel 2 Real feat. The Mad Stuntman / "Ясный мой свет" by Tatiana Bulanova	undisclosed	45,7%	RISK
14	Meerkat	"O mio babbino caro" by Giacomo Puccini	undisclosed	5%	WIN

==== Week 3 (22 February) ====
Performances on the third episode
#	Stage name	Song	Identity	Result	
1	Beetle	"Птичка" by HammAli & Navai	Dmitri Tarasov	39%	OUT
2	Fox	"Пропадаю я" by Lyubov Uspenskaya	undisclosed	24,3%	SAFE
3	Coral	"No Stress" by Laurent Wolf	undisclosed	17,6%	SAFE
4	Frog	"Трава у дома" by Zemlyane	undisclosed	14,7%	SAFE
5	Ram	"Sway" by Dean Martin	undisclosed	4,4%	WIN
6	Hummingbird	"Rolling in the Deep" by Adele / "Ain't No Mountain High Enough" by Marvin Gaye and Tammi Terrell	undisclosed	50,4%	RISK
7	Bogatyr	"Три года ты мне снилась" by Mark Bernes	undisclosed	38,9%	SAFE
8	Giraffe	"Blue Suede Shoes" by Elvis Presley	undisclosed	7,6%	SAFE
9	Beaver	"Зелёноглазое такси" by Mikhail Boyarsky	undisclosed	3,1%	WIN
10	Hippo	"No Limit" by 2 Unlimited	undisclosed	28,4%	SAFE
11	Meerkat	"Freestyler" by Bomfunk MC's / "Течёт ручей" by Nadezhda Kadysheva	undisclosed	9,9%	WIN
12	Bullfinch	"L'Été indien" by Joe Dassin	undisclosed	47,5%	RISK
13	Moon	"Нет" by Polina Gagarina	undisclosed	14,2%	SAFE

==== Week 4 (1 March) ====
Performances on the fourth episode
#	Stage name	Song	Identity	Result	
1	Bogatyr	"Влечение" by Diskoteka Avariya & Zhuki	Ilya Zudin	50%	OUT
2	Hummingbird	"Принцесса" by Elena Vaenga	undisclosed	28%	SAFE
3	Bullfinch	"Калинка" (Russian Folk Song)	undisclosed	14,4%	SAFE
4	Moon	"Listen To Your Heart" by Roxette	undisclosed	7,6%	WIN
5	Fox	"Tu es foutu" by In-Grid	undisclosed	25%	SAFE
6	Ram	"Пароход" by Leonid Agutin	undisclosed	38,6%	RISK
7	Hippo	"Havana" by Camila Cabello & Young Thug	undisclosed	21,2%	SAFE
8	Giraffe	"The World Is Not Enough" by Garbage	undisclosed	15,2%	WIN
9	Coral	"Беги по небу" by Maxim Fadeev	undisclosed	60,7%	RISK
10	Beaver	"The Rhythm of the Night" by Corona	undisclosed	9,4%	SAFE
11	Frog	"Песня Забавы" from The Flying Ship	undisclosed	24,8%	SAFE
12	Meerkat	"Let's Get It Started" by Black Eyed Peas	undisclosed	5,1%	WIN

==== Week 5 (8 March) ====
Performances on the fifth episode
#	Stage name	Song	Identity	Result	
1	Hippo	"Остров невезения" by Andrei Mironov	undisclosed	25,6%	SAFE
2	Coral	"Зелёные волны" by Zivert	Katya Lel	53,6%	OUT
3	Beaver	"Largo al factotum" from The Barber of Seville	undisclosed	11,2%	SAFE
4	Moon	"Бросай" by Yolka	undisclosed	9,6%	WIN
5	Fox	"Не упрекай" by Zhanna Aguzarova	undisclosed	34,4%	RISK
6	Ram	"Мелодия" by Muslim Magomayev	undisclosed	32,8%	SAFE
7	Giraffe	"Экспонат" by Leningrad	undisclosed	13%	WIN
8	Meerkat	"Верю в тебя" by Anna Asti	undisclosed	19,8%	SAFE
9	Bullfinch	"What a Wonderful World" by Louis Armstrong	undisclosed	44.4%	RISK
10	Hummingbird	"Лучшее в тебе" by Gosti iz Budushchego	undisclosed	39,5%	SAFE
11	Frog	"GoldenEye" by Tina Turner	undisclosed	16,1%	WIN

==== Week 6 (15 March) ====
Performances on the sixth episode
#	Stage name	Song	Identity	Result	
1	Bullfinch	"Небо и земля" by Philipp Kirkorov / "You Are the Only One" by Sergey Lazarev	undisclosed	38,1%	SAFE
2	Fox	"Армия" by Irina Allegrova	undisclosed	44,1%	RISK
3	Frog	"Беги от меня" by Gosti iz Budushchego / "Jimmy Jimmy Jimmy Aaja" by Parvati Khan and Vijay Benedict	undisclosed	13,6%	SAFE
4	Hippo	"Дорогой длинною" by Alexander Vertinsky	undisclosed	4,2%	WIN
5	Ram	"Gelato al cioccolato" by Pupo	Andrey Norkin	59,5%	OUT
6	Moon	"Снег идёт" by Glukoza	undisclosed	31%	SAFE
7	Beaver	"Часики" by Valeriya	undisclosed	9,5%	WIN
8	Meerkat	"Papaoutai" by Stromae	undisclosed	10,2%	WIN
9	Hummingbird	"Одиночество" by Slava	undisclosed	64,6%	RISK
10	Giraffe	"Poker Face" by Lady Gaga	undisclosed	25,2%	SAFE

==== Week 7 (22 March) ====
Performances on the seventh episode
#	Stage name	Song	Identity	Result	
1	Fox	"Ах, Самара-городок" by Nadezhda Kadysheva	Margarita Sukhankina	47,1%	OUT
2	Giraffe	"Ночной хулиган" by Dima Bilan	undisclosed	42,1%	SAFE
3	Hippo	"Happy" by Pharrell Williams	undisclosed	10,8%	WIN
4	Moon	"Shy Guy" by Diana King	undisclosed	31.2%	WIN
5	Bullfinch	"Худи" by GeeGun feat. Artik & Asti and Niletto	undisclosed	32%	SAFE
6	Hummingbird	"Taki Rari" by Yma Sumac	undisclosed	36,8%	RISK
7	Meerkat	"Последний танец" by Sergey Lazarev	undisclosed	23,6%	SAFE
8	Frog	"Посмотри, какое лето" by Philipp Kirkorov	undisclosed	55,3%	RISK
9	Beaver	"Tragedy" by Bee Gees	undisclosed	21,1%	WIN

==== Week 8 (29 March) ====
Performances on the eighth episode
#	Stage name	Song	Identity	Result	
1	Frog	"Baila Me" by Gipsy Kings	undisclosed	30,6%	SAFE
2	Hippo	"За четыре моря" by Blestyashchiye	Rodion Gazmanov	54,1%	OUT
3	Giraffe	"Sweet Dreams (Are Made of This)" by Eurythmics	undisclosed	15,3%	WIN
4	Meerkat	"How You Remind Me" by Nickelback	undisclosed	22,5%	WIN
5	Hummingbird	"Так красиво" by Sergey Lazarev	undisclosed	46,5%	RISK
6	Bullfinch	"Falllin'" by Alicia Keys	undisclosed	31%	SAFE
7	Moon	"Я тебя не отдам" by Serebro	undisclosed	59%	RISK
8	Beaver	"Паранойя" by Nikolai Noskov	undisclosed	41%	WIN

==== Week 9 (5 April) ====
Guest Performance: ""Вождь" performed by Aleksandr Panayotov

Performances on the ninth episode
#	Stage name	Song	Identity	Result	
1	Moon	"Casta Diva" from Norma / "Diva" by Philipp Kirkorov	undisclosed	13,7%	WIN
2	Frog	"Нет, ты не для меня" by Dmitry Malikov / "Blinding Lights" by The Weeknd	undisclosed	52%	RISK
3	Giraffe	"Scatman (Ski-Ba-Bop-Ba-Dop-Bop)" by Scatman John	undisclosed	34,3%	SAFE
4	Meerkat	"Выше головы" by Polina Gagarina	undisclosed	52%	IMM
5	Beaver	"I Was Made for Lovin' You" by Kiss	undisclosed	48%	WIN
6	Hummingbird	"Je suis malade" by Lara Fabian	undisclosed	40%	WIN
7	Bullfinch	"Орлы или Вороны" by Maxim Fadeev and Grigory Leps	Arseniy Borodin	60%	OUT

==== Week 10 (12 April) ====
Performances on the tenth episode
#	Stage name	Song	Identity	Result
1	Frog	"Угонщица" by Irina Allegrova	undisclosed	RISK
2	Beaver	"Я тебя рисую" by Jaak Joala	undisclosed	WIN
3	Tomato	"A Sky Full of Stars" by Coldplay	Aleksandr Revva	GUEST
4	Hummingbird	"Лети, пёрышко" by Irina Leonova	Zara	OUT
5	Giraffe	"Я не боюсь" by Sergey Lazarev	undisclosed	WIN
6	Double Bass	"Ария Мистера Икс" from The Circus Princess	Iosif Prigozhin	GUEST
7	Moon	"Ночь" by Andrey Gubin	undisclosed	RISK
8	Meerkat	"The Prayer" by Celine Dion and Andrea Bocelli	undisclosed	WIN

==== Week 11 (19 April) ====
Performances on the eleventh episode
#	Stage name	Song	Identity	Result
1	Clown	"Я ― заводной!" by Valery Leontiev	Viktor Saltykov	GUEST
2	Moon	"All by Myself" by Eric Carmen	Aleksandra Vorobyova	OUT
3	Frog	"Who Wants to Live Forever" by Queen	undisclosed	WIN
4	Push	"Rich Girl" by Gwen Stefani feat. Eve	Stas Yarushin	GUEST
5	Meerkat	"Beautiful Things" by Benson Boone	undisclosed	RISK
6	Beaver	"Кукла колдуна" by Korol i Shut	undisclosed	SAFE
7	Giraffe	"I'm Outta Love" by Anastacia	undisclosed	WIN

==== Week 12 (26 April) ====
===== Round One =====
Performances on the final episode – round one
#	Stage name	Song	Identity	Result
1	Frog	"Выпьем за любовь" by Igor Nikolayev	Alexandra Ursuliak	FINALIST
2	Giraffe	"History Repeating" by Propellerheads feat. Shirley Bassey	undisclosed	SAFE
3	Beaver	"Казанова" by Valery Leontiev	undisclosed	SAFE
4	Meerkat	"Believer" by Imagine Dragons	undisclosed	SAFE

===== Round Two =====
Performances on the final episode – round two
#	Stage name	Song	Identity	Result
1	Meerkat	"Небо на ладони" by Soso Pavliashvili	SOCRAT	THIRD
2	Beaver	"I Will Survive" by Gloria Gaynor	Dmitriy Zhuravlyov	RUNNER-UP
3	Giraffe	"Не для меня" by Feodor Chaliapin	Polina Gagarina	WINNER
