= Zolotoe Koltso =

Russian folk ensemble

Golden Ring
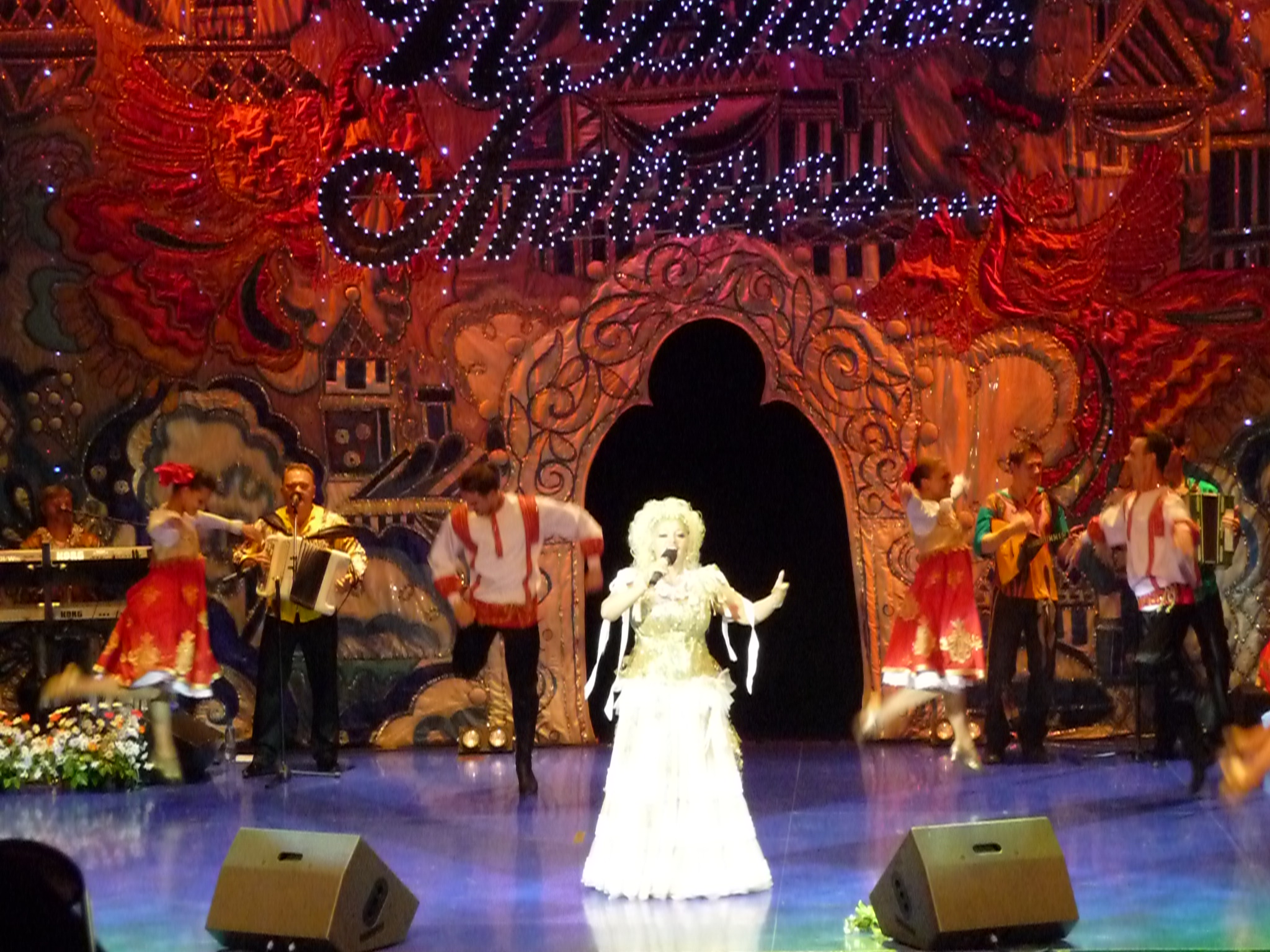

Background information
- Genres: contemporary folk music, folk-pop
- Years active: 1988–present
- Members: Nadezhda Kadysheva; Alexander Kostyuk; Andrey Kuredenko; Valery Zhukov; Dmitry Ivanov; Vladimir Pudovkin
- Past members: Dmitry Ananiev; Victor Nadymov
- Website: golden-ring.ru

Golden Ring (Russian: Золотое кольцо, transliteration: Zolotoye Koltso) is a Russian folk-pop group, founded 1988 in Moscow by Alexander Kostyuk and Nadezhda Kadysheva. The name of the group refers to the Golden Ring of Russia.
