= Rosa Syabitova =

Russian television presenter (born 1962)

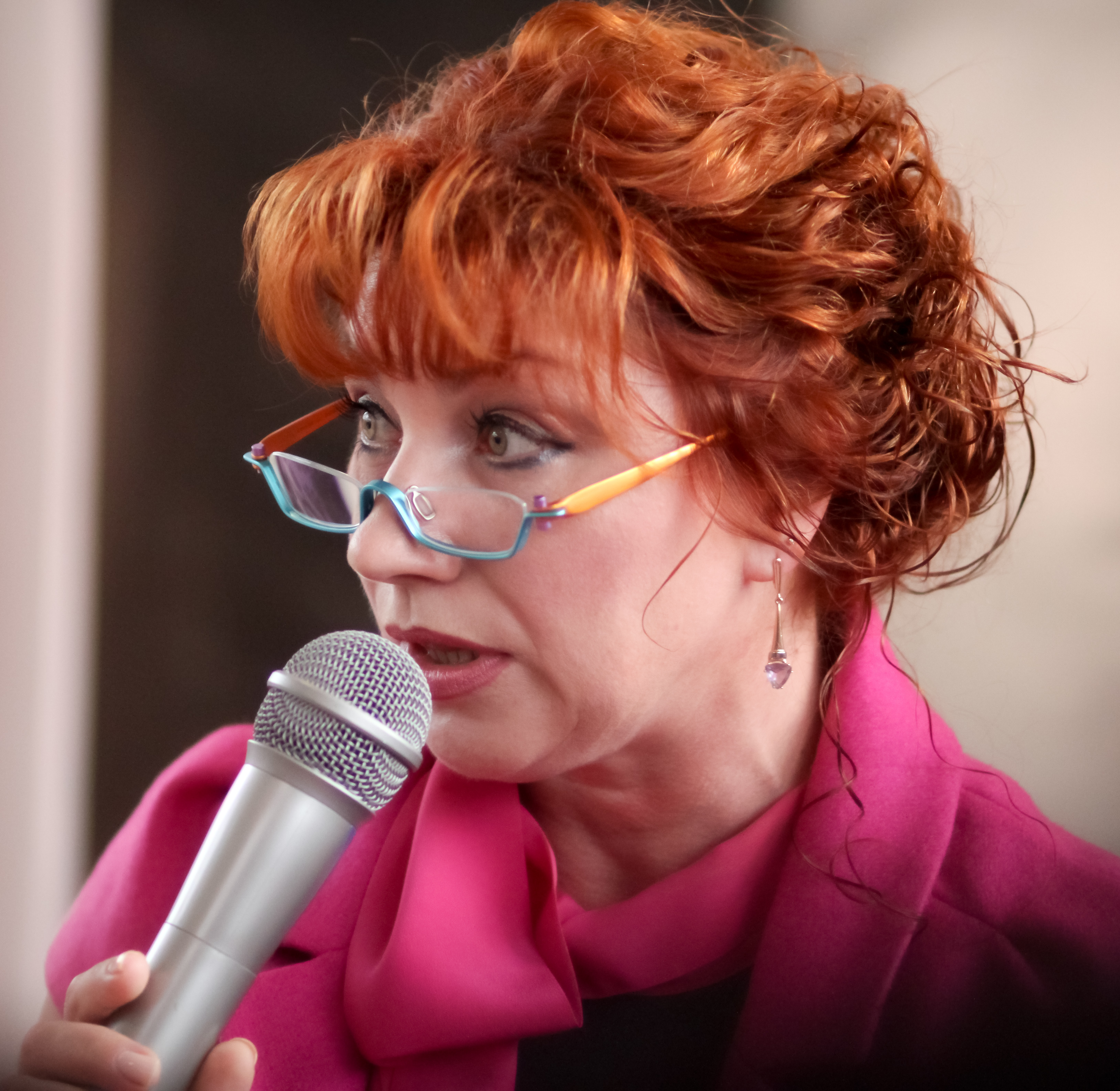
- Roza Syabitova in 2010
- Born: 10 February 1962 (age 64); Moscow, RSFSR, USSR
- Occupations: TV presenter, matchmaker
- Years active: 1995 - present

Rosa Raifovna Syabitova (Russian: Ро́за Раи́фовна Сяби́това; born February 10, 1962, in Moscow) is best known as a television personality on the Channel One Russian television show, Let's Get Married since 2008.

Rosa is also the creator and owner of a dating agency.

== Biography ==
Her father worked as a locksmith. And mother is a native of the village of Kichkalnya from a noble family. As a child she was fond of skating and other sports. After graduating from high school in 1979 she entered the Moscow Institute of Electronic Machine Building (MIEM) as a software engineer.

Her first marriage was from 1983-1993. The marriage had two children: Denis and Ksenia. The first husband died of a heart attack.

In 2008 on the set of TV show "Let's get married" Syabitova met with one of the program participants, Yuri Andreyev, who became her second husband. They were divorced in 2011.

=== Career ===
In 1995 Syabitova opened her own dating agency Me.

In 2007 Syabitova started to host the TV show "I Love" on Stream TV She also participated in the program Good Morning on Channel One.

In 2008 she hosted the television show Let's Get Married, as a professional Matchmaker - where she works presently.

She also works on the closed television program "Meet the Parents (Russia)" in 2010.

== Author of books ==
- What is a Woman, or How to Raise Self-esteem
- A Man of Your Dreams
- How to Find Your Love. Tips First Matchmaker of Russia
- How to Fall in Love with Anyone. Secrets of the Men Who Every Woman Should Know
- Techniques of Marriage Studies. The Traps, Tricks, Cunning and Wise Role of Woman
- All the Tricks, Techniques and Pitfalls of a Real Woman
- Why Do Some Love, But On the Other Get Married? Secrets of a Successful Marriage
