= Nadezhda Kadysheva =

Russian singer (born 1959)

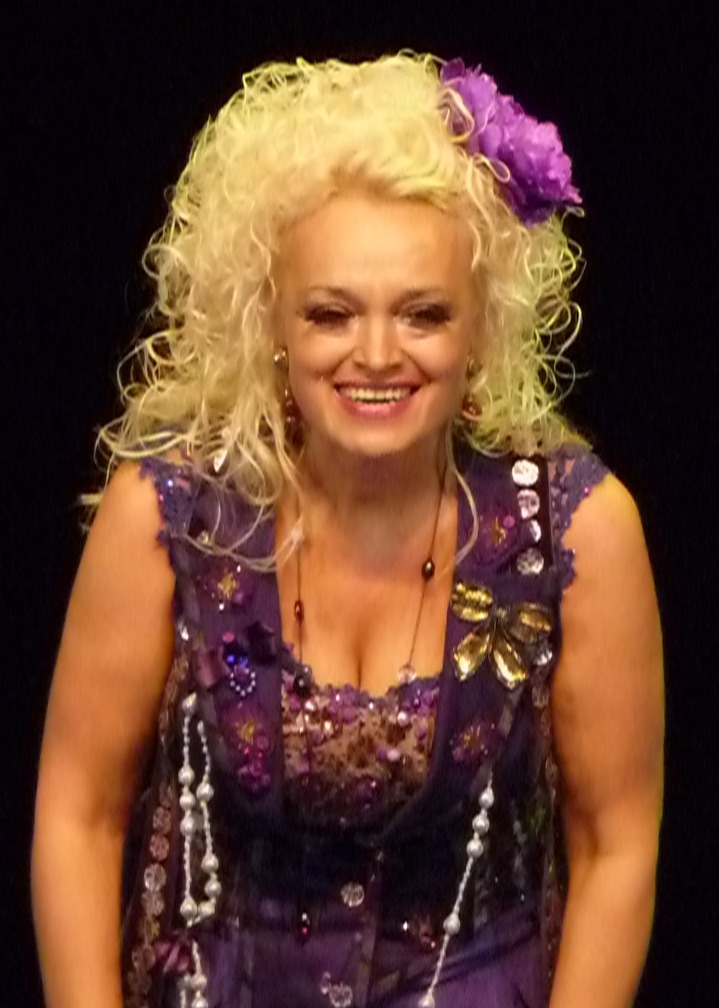
- Kadysheva in 2009
- Born: Nadezhda Nikitichna Kadysheva; 1 June 1959 (age 67); Gorki, Leninogorsky District, TASSR, Soviet Union
- Occupation: Singer
- Title: People's Artist of Russia (1999)
- Awards: Golden Gramophone Award (2008)
- Website: kadisheva.ru

Nadezhda Nikitichna Kadysheva (Russian: Надeжда Никитична Кадышeва, pronounced [nɐˈdʲeʐdə nʲɪˈkʲitʲɪtɕnə ˈkadɨʂɨvə]; born 1 June 1959) is a Russian folk-pop singer of Erzyan heritage, she is the soloist of the band Zolotoe Koltso. She is an Honorary Citizen of Bugulma, People's Artist of Russia (1999), People's Artist of Mordovia, and a Honored Artist of Tatarstan. She received the Golden Gramophone Award in 2008.

== Biography ==
=== Life and career ===
She was born in the Mordvinian village of Gorki in Tatarstan. Her father, Nikita Mikhailovich Kadyshev worked for the railways, her mother, Anna Andreyevna stayed at home with four daughters. Kadysheva was 10 years old when her mother died, and half a year later her father remarried. She had to leave for a boarding school in Bugulma, where her singing talent was first discovered. However, at age 14 she had to start working at a cotton factory. At 18 years of age, she applied to the Mikhail Ippolitov-Ivanov College of Music, but she was rejected, in her own words for her "lack of musical preparation". After completing a preparatory course, she was admitted the next year. This is where she met her future husband, Aleksandr Kostyuk, at the dormitory that they shared with students of the Gnessin State Musical College, where Kostyuk also studied at. In her third year, she was invited to perform with the ensemble Rossiyanochka. Then, she followed Kostyuk to the Gnessin. Kostyuk proposed to her and they married in 1983 in San Francisco. Their son, Grigoriy was born the next year. In 1988, they established Zolotoe Koltso and started performing abroad. They were more well known abroad than in Russia, and they only became known there from 1993, when the local Soyuz record label offered them a contract. She is a member of the United Russia party.
