= Alexey Glyzin =

Soviet-Russian singer (born 1954)

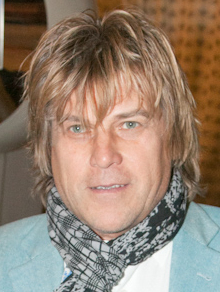

Background information
- Born: Alexey Sergeevich Glyzin; January 13, 1954 (age 72)
- Genres: Pop, Russian pop
- Occupation: Singer
- Years active: 1977–present

Alexey Sergeevich Glyzin (Russian: Алексе́й Серге́евич Глы́зин; born January 13, 1954, Mytischi) is a Soviet and Russian pop singer and actor. He has received various awards, including Honored Artist of Russia (2006), and the Chanson of the Year award (2016).

== Early life ==
Born January 13, 1954.

After studying at the correspondence department in Tambov he transferred to the Moscow State Art and Cultural University, where he studied on a full-time pop-brass faculty. In the third year he was drafted into the army in the Far East, where he served near the Chinese border, a junior aviation specialists. Then he moved to the music platoon.

== Career ==
He worked in the ensemble band Dobry Molodtsy. In 1977 he joined Samotsvety. In 1978 he joined Rhythm, accompanying Alla Pugacheva. From 1979 to 1988 he played in the Vesyolye Rebyata ensemble. In August 1988, he gathered a group he named Ura and started a solo career.

He released 7 albums, 3 of which were collections of his songs. In 2006, Vladimir Putin signed a decree on awarding Alexey Glyzin honorary title Honored Artist of Russia.

== Personal life ==
His first wife was Lyudmila Glyzina. Later he married rhythmic gymnast Sania Glyzina (Babiy) (1971). His children are TV and movie director Alexey Glyzin (1975) and Igor Glyzin (1992) who engaged in melee combat. Glyzin also has a grandson, Denis, who was born in April 2005.
