= Kai Metov =

Russian singer-songwriter and composer (born 1964)

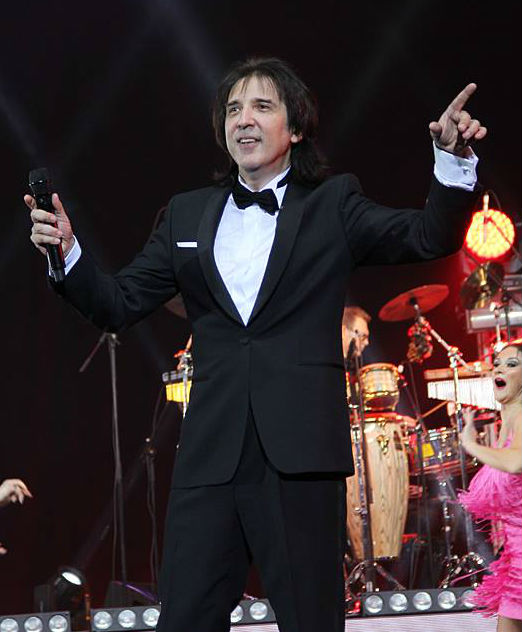

Background information
- Born: Kairat Erdenovich Akhmetov; 19 September 1964 (age 62); Karaganda, Soviet Union
- Genres: Synthpop, Russian pop
- Occupation: Singer
- Years active: 1991–present

Kairat Erdenovich "Kai" Metov (Russian: Кайрат Ерденович "Кай" Метов; 19 September 1964, Karaganda, Kazakh SSR, USSR) is a Russian singer-songwriter and composer. Honored Artist of Russia (2015).
