= Bianka (singer) =

Belarusian-Russian singer and songwriter (born 1985)

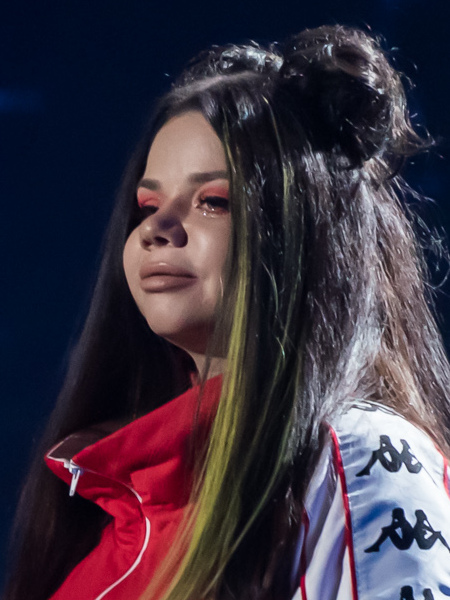

Background information
- Born: Tatianna Eduardovna Lipnitskaya; 17 September 1985 (age 41); Minsk, Byelorussian SSR
- Origin: Minsk, Belarus
- Genres: Pop, R&B, hip hop, rap, dance
- Occupations: Singer, producer, tv host, actress, dancer
- Years active: 2001–present
- Website: biankanumber1.ru

Tatyana Eduardovna Lipnitskaya (Belarusian: Таццяна Эдуардаўна Ліпніцкая; Russian: Татьяна Эдуардовна Липницкая; born on 17 September 1985), better known by her stage name Bianka, is a Belarusian and Russian singer, songwriter and rapper. She rose to prominence in 2005 with the release of her song Swan which later on became the soundtrack to the Russian film, Бой с тенью, Shadow Boxing.

Aside from Belarus, she is popular in Russia, FSU and Israel.

== Biography and career ==
Tatiana was born on 17 September 1985, in Minsk.

As a child, she sang in choir and participated in folk dance groups. However, she was expelled from the choir for non-traditional vocals. In 2005 Bianka received a formal offer to represent Belarus in the international "Eurovision Song Contest" and at the same time, she was invited to work in Moscow, with Sergei Parkhomenko (Serge). She declined. In the same year, Bianca with Max Lawrence released the song "Swan", which later was put on the soundtrack of the film " Shadow Boxing ". In 2006 came the album "Russian Folk R'n'B". In the same year, the singer's debut music video for the song "There Were Dances" was released. There is also an English version of this song.

In 2007 she published a collection of her songs on the album- "On the summer." In 2008 – the album "38 locks".In 2011 came the album "Our Generation" was released, in which she released songs in hip-hop, rap. In 2013, Bianka released the album "Bianka.Music", in this album dance music was presented.

== Studio albums ==
1. Russian Folk R'n'B (2006)
2. About Summer (2007)
3. 38 Locks (2008)
4. Our Generation (2011)
5. Bianka. Music (2014)
6. Thoughts in Notes (2016)
7. Than I love (2018)
8. Harmony (2018)
