= The Color of Mood is Black =

"Цвет настроения чёрный"

Single by Egor Kreed & Philipp Kirkorov
- Language: Russian
- English title: The Color of Mood is Black
- Released: September 14, 2018
- Genre: Hip hop
- Label: Black Star Inc.

"The Color of Mood is Black" (Russian: "Цвет настроения чёрный") is a song by Russian singers Egor Kreed & Philipp Kirkorov, released on 14 September 2018.

== History ==
In a video on his Instagram account, Egor Kreed announced the single.

== Music video ==
A video was published on the YouTube-channel of the label Black Star on the day the song was released. According to Kirkorov, the music video "Цвет настроения чёрный" completes the trilogy involving the videos "The Color of Mood is Blue" & "Ibiza".

== Awards and nominations ==
Award	Year	Category	Result	Ref.
Award "Дай пять!"	2019	"Best song"	Nominated	
Премия Муз-ТВ	2019	"Best duet"	Won	
