= Wider Circle =

- Genre: Variety television show; Talent show
- Created by: Olga Molchanova
- Written by: Olga Molchanova; Alexei Garnizov; Alexander Abrosimov; Gennady Bichurin
- Directed by: Gennady Bichurin; Mark Rozhdestvin; Nikita Tikhonov
- Narrated by: Vsevolod Abdulov (1976—1995); Alexei Garnizov
- Countries of origin: Soviet Union; Russia
- Original language: Russian

Production
- Editor: Olga Molchanova
- Running time: from 1 hour 30 minutes to 1 hour 50 minutes
- Production companies: Main editorial office of folk art of Central Television of the USSR (1976—1991); Television association "Folk Art" All-Union State Television and Radio Company (1991); Studio "Folk Art" RGTRK "Ostankino" (1992—1995)

Original release
- Network: Programme One Soviet Central Television (1976—1991); Channel One (1992—1995); TV Center (2000—2007)
- Release: 30 December 1976 – 1 January 2007

Wider Circle (Russian: Шире Круг, romanized: Shire Krug) is a variety television show that first aired on 30 December 1976, on Soviet Central Television. It featured performances from both professional artists and amateur performers.

== History ==
The program was created in the Main editorial office of folk art of Central Television. The creator and chief editor was Olga Molchanova, with directors Gennady Bichurin and Mark Rozhdestvin. The original aim of the program was to discover talented but relatively unknown performers and hosts. Young talents showcased their skills in various areas of performance arts: dance, song, instrumental and folk music, and circus acts. The performers included crane operators, engineers, librarians, teachers, construction workers, nurses, shop assistants, schoolchildren, and factory workers.

The first episode featured amateur artists, including emerging musicians rather than popular stars. One of the performances was by composer and singer Yuri Antonov, who sang "The Roof of Your House", which later became a hit.

The show quickly gained popularity with viewers, and increasingly, young professional pop singers began to appear. Among the many artists who started their careers on the show were Philipp Kirkorov, Alexey Glyzin, Olga Zarubina, Alexander Serov, Yuri Loza, Leonid Agutin, Dmitry Malikov, Valeriya, Vyacheslav Malezhik, Ekaterina Semenova, Yaroslav Evdokimov, Alexander Malinin, Taisiya Litvinenko, Nadezhda Chepraga, Anne Veski, Vyacheslav Dobrynin, Alena Apina, Natasha Koroleva, Mikhail Zadornov, Gennady Vetrov, Julian, and the groups Sekret and Ivanushki International.

Famous composers such as Vladimir Shainsky, Alexander Dobronravov, and Raimonds Pauls also appeared on the show.

The show did not have a permanent host, and various popular artists hosted different episodes over the years.

The show was filmed not only at the Ostankino studio but also included some on-location filming in various cities across the USSR, including sports halls and cultural centers (Pyatigorsk, Odessa, Nizhny Novgorod, Cherepovets, Irkutsk).

In 1983, Yuri Antonov premiered his new song "Shire Krug" with lyrics by Leonid Fadeev, which later became the show's theme song. The song was performed by the band "Blue Bird".

Since 23 September 2000, the show began airing on the "TV Center" channel.

Hosts over the years included Vyacheslav Malezhik, Ekaterina Semenova, Tatiana Menshikova, Yuri Okhochinsky, Rafael Tsitalashvili, Maxim Leonidov, Vladimir Danilin, Tatiana Vedeneyeva, Valentina Legkostupova, Pavel Smeian, Viktor Krivonos, Olga Denisenko, Ilona Bronievitskaya, Yuri Antonov, Philipp Kirkorov, Jasmine, Alena Apina, and Gennady Vetrov.

In May 2002, program creator, producer, and artistic director Olga Molchanova received the national Russian music award "Ovation" in the category "For outstanding contribution to the development of musical television".

On 1 January 2007, a special concert episode was broadcast on "TV Centre" to celebrate the 30th anniversary of the show.

== Ovechkin family ==
In 1985, the Ovechkin family from Irkutsk performed with their jazz ensemble "Seven Simeons" on the program. The children played an instrumental composition about a brave captain, and the performance was a huge success. The Ovechkins were covered in the press, and a documentary was made about them. On 8 March 1988, these now-grown musicians hijacked a plane with hostages in an attempt to escape the USSR. The hijacking attempt failed, and during the assault, nine people were killed, including the mother Ninel Ovechkina and four of her older sons, along with a flight attendant and three passengers. Nineteen people were injured, including two Ovechkins, two police officers, and fifteen passengers.

== Predecessor shows ==
The program "Wider Circle" was preceded by shows such as "The Screen Gathers Friends", "Musical Tournament of Cities", "Tele-Theatre Welcomes Guests", and "Carousel". With advancements in television technology, the editorial team began producing more complex programs. For example, in "Musical Tournament of Cities", viewer voting was conducted live. Female engineers operated communication consoles to tally votes from viewers after the broadcast of each city’s segment. The results were then conveyed to the jury chairman for announcement on air.
