= 2005 World Music Awards =

17th award event

Under the patronage of Prince Albert II of Monaco the 17th annual World Music Awards were conducted at the Kodak Theatre in Hollywood, California on August 31, 2005. This was only the second time that the awards show had been held outside of Monaco. The five-hour awards show was co-hosted by Carmen Electra and Desperate Housewives' James Denton. The awards were based on record sales certified by the International Federation of the Phonographic Industry, a London-based trade group that represents the major record labels. Proceeds were donated to the Prince's favorite charity: the Monaco Aide and Presence Foundation.

Usher, Kenny "Babyface" Edmonds, Amerie, Rihanna, and Teairra Marí paid tribute to Destiny's Child, who received an award for being the best-selling female group of all time. Patti LaBelle dedicated her performance of "I'll Stand By You" to the victims of Hurricane Katrina as did Stevie Wonder and Kid Rock when they closed the show at 2 AM with a duet of "Living for the City". Other performers included: 50 Cent, Amerie, Biagio Antonacci, Carlos Santana, Ciara, Delta Goodrem, Destiny's Child, Elissa, Eminem, Fantasia Barrino, Jay-Z, Kelly Clarkson, Mariah Carey, Michelle Branch, Philipp Kirkorov, Ricky Martin, Rob Thomas, Shakira and Snoop Dogg. The show was broadcast in the United States by the American Broadcasting Company (ABC) on September 13, 2005.

== World Diamond Award ==
The Diamond Award honored those recording artists who had sold over 100 million albums during their career.

- Bon Jovi

== Winners ==
=== All Time ===
- World's Best-Selling Female Group of All Time: Destiny's Child
- World's Best-Selling Touring Band of All Time: The Rolling Stones

=== Legend Award ===
- Carlos Santana

=== Entertainers of the Year ===
- Female Entertainer of the Year: Mariah Carey
- Male Entertainer of the Year: 2Face

=== New ===
- World's Best-Selling New Female Artist: Gwen Stefani
- World's Best-Selling New Group: The Killers
- World's Best-Selling New Male Artist: The Game

=== Pop ===
- World's Best-Selling Female Pop Artist: Mariah Carey
- World's Best-Selling Male Pop Artist: 50 Cent
- World's Best-Selling Pop Group: Destiny's Child

=== Pop Rock ===
- World's Best-Selling Pop Rock Artist: Eminem

=== Rap Hip-Hop ===
- World's Best-Selling Rap Hip-Hop Artist: Eminem

=== Rock ===
- World's Best-Selling Rock Group: U2

Mariah Carey, Netherlands, April 1, 1998

=== R&B ===
- World's Best-Selling R&B Artist: Mariah Carey
- World's Best-Selling R&B Group: Destiny's Child

=== Regional Awards ===
- Best-Selling American Artist: Mariah Carey
- Best-Selling Australian Artist: Delta Goodrem
- Best-Selling Canadian Artist: Michael Bublé
- Best-Selling Dutch Artist: Within Temptation
- Best-Selling English Artist: Coldplay
- Best-Selling French Artist: Raphael
- Best-Selling German Artist: Rammstein
- Best-Selling Greek Artist: Sakis Rouvas
- Best-Selling Italian Artist: Biagio Antonacci
- Best-Selling Middle Eastern Artist: Elissa
- Best-Selling Russian Artist: Philipp Kirkorov
- Best-Selling Spanish Artist: Alejandro
- Best-Selling Swiss Artist: DJ Bobo
- Best-Selling Korean Artist: BoA

== Records ==
- Mariah Carey won four awards: World's Best-Selling R&B Artist, World's Best-Selling Pop Female Artist, Female Entertainer of the Year and Best-Selling American Artist.
- Destiny's Child won three awards: World's Best-Selling Pop Group, World's Best-Selling R&B Group and World's Best-Selling Female Group of All Time.
