= Philipp Kirkorov =

Bulgarian-born Russian singer (born 1967)

Philipp Kirkorov PAR
- Филипп Киркоров
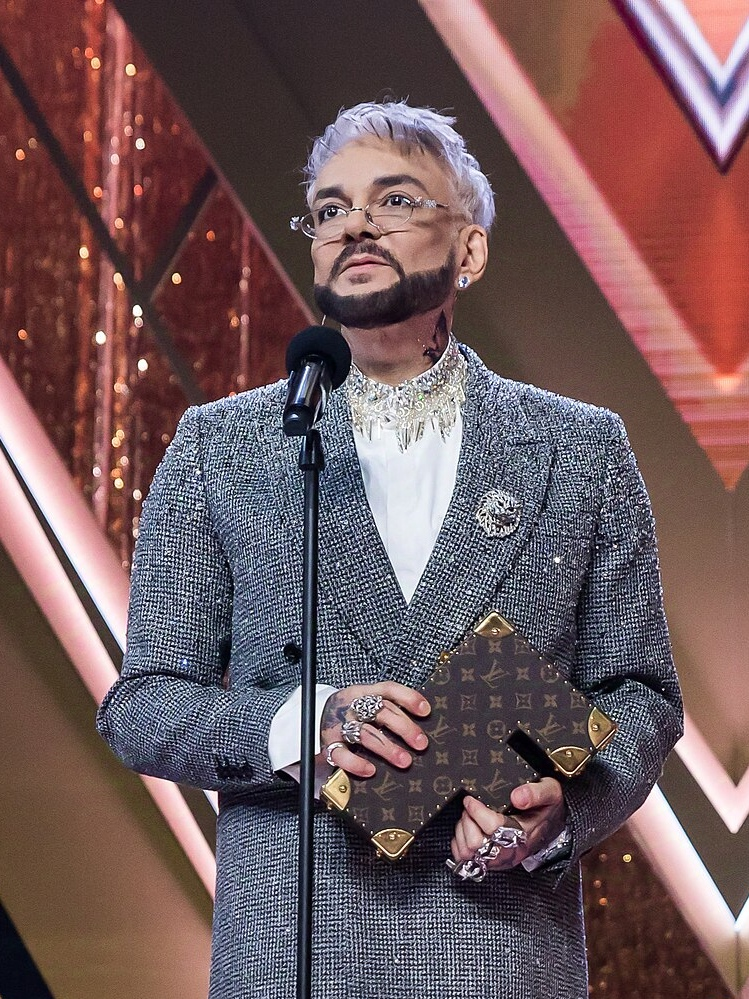
- Kirkorov in 2025
- Born: Filip Bedrosov Kirkorov; 30 April 1967 (age 59); Varna, PR Bulgaria
- Occupation: Singer
- Years active: 1985–present
- Title: People's Artist of Russia (2008); People's Artist of Ukraine (2008); People's Artist of Moldova (2018)
- Spouse: Alla Pugacheva (m. 1994; div. 2005)
- Partner: Margo Ovsianikova (2024–)
- Children: 2
- Parents: Bedros Kirkorov (1932–2025) (father); Victoria Likhacheva (1937–1994) (mother)
- Awards: Order of Honour (Russia, 2017); Order of Francysk Skaryna (Belarus, 2012); World Music Awards (1996, 1999, 2004, 2005, 2008)
- Philipp Kirkorov's voice Kikrov's interview on the Echo of Moscow program, 16 April 2005
- Website: www.kirkorov.ru

Signature
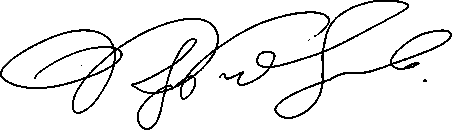

Philipp Bedros Kirkorov (Note: Russian: Филипп Бедросович Киркоров, romanized: Filipp Bedrosovich Kirkorov, IPA: [fʲɪˈlʲib bʲɪˈdrosəvʲɪtɕ kʲɪrˈkorəf]; (Note: In this name that follows East Slavic naming customs, the patronymic is Bedrosovich and the family name is Kirkorov.) Bulgarian: Филип Бедросов Киркоров, romanized: Filip Bedrosov Kirkorov. (Note: In this Bulgarian name, the patronymic is Bedrosov and the family name is Kirkorov.)) (born 30 April 1967) is a Bulgarian-born Russian singer. He began his career in 1985 after participating in the Soviet musical TV show "Wider Circle". Since 2000, he has maintained public interest in his person with a scandalous reputation and recording remakes of hits by international performers from Europe and the United States. In 1995, he represented Russia at the Eurovision Song Contest with the song "Kolybelnaya dlya vulkana", and took 17th place.

During his creative career, he achieved success in Russia, Belarus and other countries of the former USSR, and was awarded many Russian music prizes, including ZD Awards and others. He is a five-time winner of the "Best Selling Russian Artist" title at the World Music Awards ceremonies.

== Biography ==
=== Early life and education ===
Philipp Kirkorov was born on 30 April 1967 in Varna, Bulgaria. His father, Bedros Kirkorov, was a Bulgarian-born singer of Armenian origin. He began traveling on tours with his parents at the age of five. During his childhood, he lived in Moscow. It is believed that his first stage appearance occurred at the age of five during his father's concert in Petrozavodsk Theater. His father performed the autobiographical song "Synok" ("Son"), dedicated to Soviet tank crews he met in 1944 in Varna. At the end of the song, Filipp walked onto the stage to give his father a carnation as the audience applauded.

He graduated from Moscow School No. 413 with a gold medal. After school, he attempted to enroll in a theater institute but failed the entrance exams.

In 1984, he entered the Gnessin State Musical College in the musical comedy department, graduating in 1988 with honors.

=== Early career ===
In November 1985, Kirkorov made his television debut on the program Wider Circle with the song "Alyosha" in Bulgarian.

He was noticed by Svetlana Annapolskaya, the director of Goluboy Ogonyok, who invited him to participate in the program. After a dispute with the show's management, she successfully secured Kirkorov's involvement.

In 1987, he received an invitation to work with the Leningrad Music Hall under Ilya Rakhlin. This led to a foreign tour in Berlin's renowned Friedrichstadt-Palast Theater.

After leaving the Music Hall, Kirkorov met lyricist Ilya Reznik, who became one of his early supporters.

In April 1988, he met Alla Pugacheva at Ilya Reznik's art exhibit. By October 1988, she invited him to participate in her Christmas Meetings. By this time, Kirkorov had graduated from Gnesin College, competed in his first contest in Yalta, and filmed his first music video for the song "Carmen."

During preparations for Christmas Meetings, he collaborated with poet Leonid Derbenyov, who wrote many of his future hits, including "Ty, Ty, Ty" ("You, You, You"), "Nebo i Zemlya" ("Sky and Earth") and "Atlantida" ("Atlantis").

=== Career ===
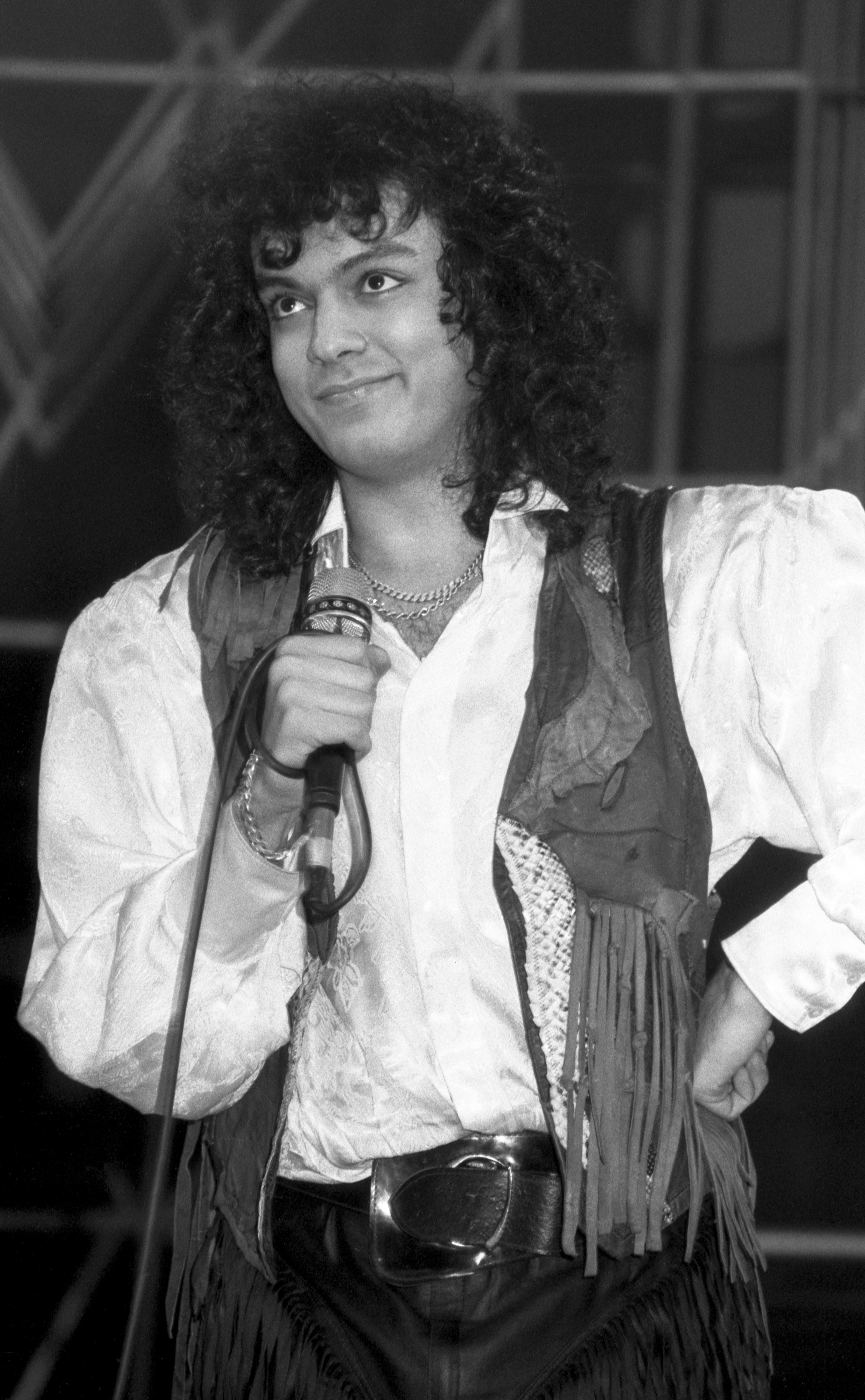
Kirkorov in 1991

In 1989, Kirkorov toured with Alla Pugacheva in Australia and Germany and held his first solo concert in Perm. That year, he reached the finals of the Pesnya Goda music festival.

In 1990, Kirkorov won the Grand Prix in the competition "Shlyager-90" (Hit-90) in Leningrad with the song "Nebo i Zemlya" (Sky and Earth). In 1992, his music video to the song "Atlantida" (Atlantis) was selected as "Music Video of the Year". His popularity began to spread outside of Russia and he toured in the United States, Canada, Germany, and Israel.

By 1994, his program "Ya ne Raphael" (I'm not Raphael) included hits by Engelbert Humperdinck, Tom Jones, and Frank Sinatra. Kirkorov represented Russia in the Eurovision Song Contest 1995 held in Dublin with the song "Kolybelnaya dlya vulkana" ('Lullaby for the volcano') and finished in 17th place.

At the end of 1995, the double CD Skazhi Solntsu:"Da" (Say "Yes!" to the Sun) was released under the Polygram label. The album's release coincided with the premiere of the program The Best, the Beloved, and Just for You at the State Variety Theatre, which then successfully toured across the country.

In 1996, he won the World Music Awards for best-selling Russian artist with over 2 million copies sold. By 1997, his world tour covered 100 cities, culminating in a month-long residency at the Oktyabrsky Concert Hall in St. Petersburg.

His 1998 album Oh, Mama, I'll give Chic (Oy, Mama, Shika Dam!) contains four cover versions of well-known Turkish songs originally sung by Tarkan, Mustafa Sandal and Sezen Aksu.

In 1999, Kirkorov joined Michael Jackson's MJ & Friends charity concert.

Starting in the 2000s, Kirkorov became increasingly involved in music production, managing and mentoring several Russian artists he personally discovered. He co-wrote the Belarusian entry at the Eurovision Song Contest 2007, "Work Your Magic" for Dmitry Koldun, wrote the 2008 Ukrainian entry "Shady Lady", performed by Ani Lorak, and also co-composed Moldova's Eurovision entry for the 2021 contest, "Sugar", which was performed by Natalia Gordienko. He was also a judge in the second season of Music Idol in Bulgaria. Kirkorov makes a cameo in Verka Serduchka's video "Do Re Mi".

In 2017, after collaborating with rapper Timati, Kirkorov signed with the Black Star record label. In 2018, his song "The Color of Mood is Blue" became a viral hit, garnering over 40 million views on YouTube. That year, his duet with Nikolay Baskov on "Ibiza" also gained attention for its satirical music video. In September 2018, he collaborated with Egor Kreed to release "The Color of Mood is Black" ("Zvet Nastroenija Tschorny"), which became another viral hit, amassing over 100 million views on YouTube.

In November 2024, Kirkorov presented his music video/short film Black Panther.

=== Television projects ===
From 2003 to 2016, Kirkorov hosted various ceremonies and television shows, including "Morning with Kirkorov" on STS, "Minuta Slavy" ("Minute of Fame"), "Factor A," and the "RU.TV 2016 Awards," among others.

Since 2006, he has frequently served as a judge on numerous programs, such as "KVN," "Dancing with the Stars," "Minute of Fame," "Star Factory," "New Wave," "Odin v Odin!" ("One to One!"), "Toch-v-Toch" ("Just Like"). Since 2020, Philipp Kirkorov has served as a judge on the Russian adaptation of the international hit reality show The Masked Singer, titled The Mask (Maska). The show, aired on NTV, features celebrities competing in elaborate costumes while concealing their identities.

In 2021, Kirkorov won the TEFI award for Best Entertainment Show Host for his work on The Mask. The show has continued to attract high ratings on Russian television, and Kirkorov has become closely associated with it.

In 2023, Kirkorov joined Emperor's Treasures (Sokrovishcha Imperatora) together with actor Wolfgang Cerny, a competitive reality show that combines adventure, history, and treasure hunting. Airing on TNT, the program involves celebrities exploring China's rich cultural and historical heritage while solving clues to uncover hidden treasures.

=== Film ===
Philipp Kirkorov occasionally participates in musicals and film dubbing. For example, he provided the voice for the main character in the film The New Adventures of Aladdin (2015) and the parrot Kiki in Richard the Stork (2017).

Kirkorov has also made numerous cameo appearances in various TV series and films, including My Fair Nanny (2006), Flight Crew (2016), The Double (2013), Voronin's Family (2017), Naughty Grandma (2017) and Grand Hotel (2018).

In 2009, Kirkorov had his first significant film role in the Russian-Ukrainian romantic comedy Love in the Big City. In the film he played Saint Valentine. He reprised his role in the following two sequels Love in the Big City 2 and Love in the Big City 3. The films also starred Volodymyr Zelenskyy, Aleksey Chadov and Vera Brezhneva.

== Personal life ==
In 1994, he proposed to Alla Pugacheva and she accepted. On 13 January, the couple announced their engagement in Moscow. On 15 March, the marriage was registered in St. Petersburg by then-mayor Anatoly Sobchak. On 15 May, the wedding of Kirkorov and Pugacheva took place in Jerusalem.

Other than his native Bulgarian, he is fluent in Russian, and is proficient in Spanish and English.

In January 2023, Ukraine imposed sanctions on Kirkorov for his support of the Russian invasion of Ukraine.

On 24 March 2024, Philipp Kirkorov left Russia for Baku, Azerbaijan, after an administrative case regarding tax evasion was opened against the artist, and the bank accounts of his companies were blocked.

== Honours and awards ==
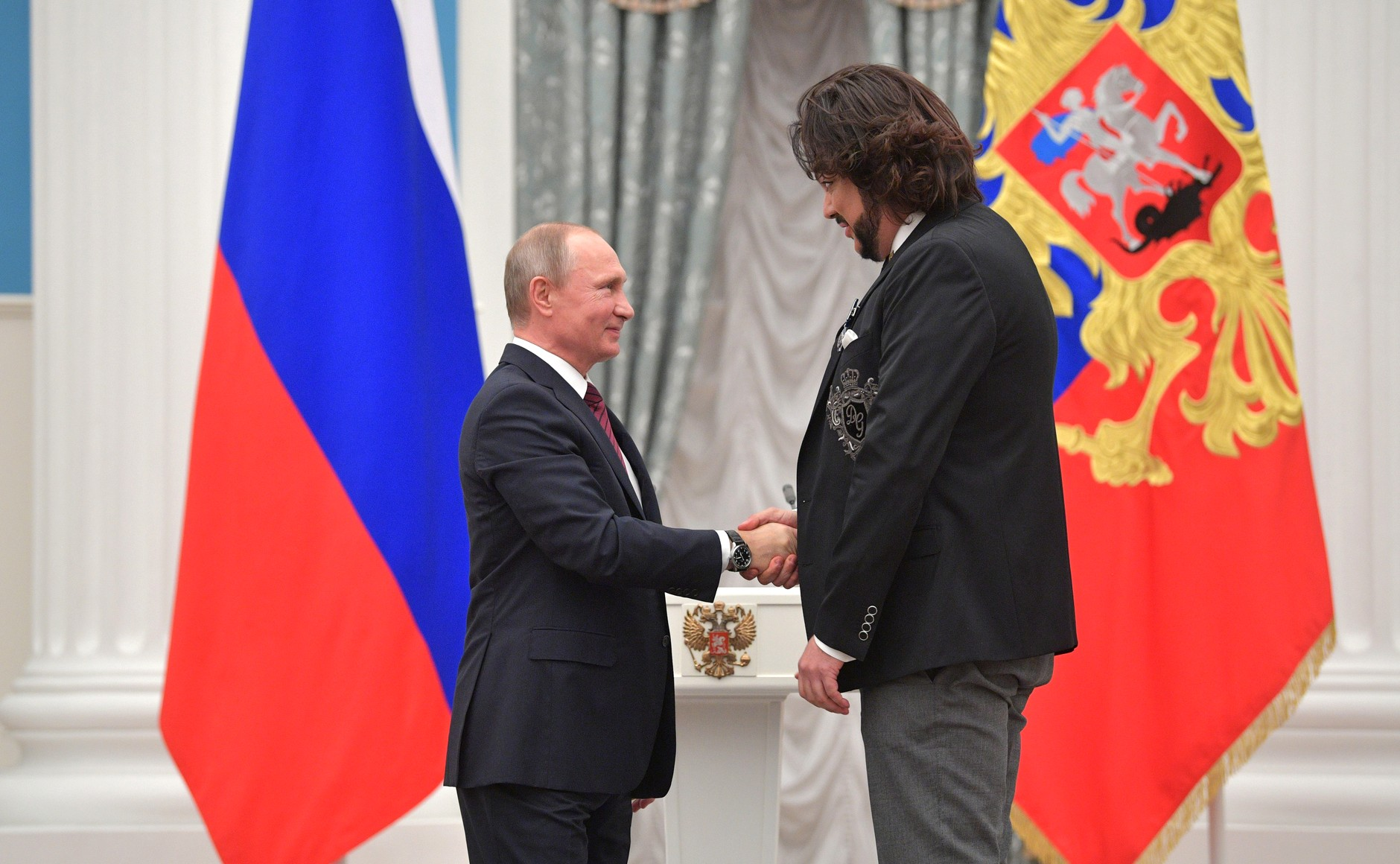
Kirkorov receives the Order of Honor from Russian president Vladimir Putin, 15 November 2017

Orders

- Order of Honor (30 April 2017) - for great contribution to the development of national music art and many years of creative activity.
- Order of Francesc Skarina (Belarus, 18 May 2012) - For a significant personal contribution to the development and strengthening of Belarusian-Russian cultural ties, high performing skills.

Titles

- Order of Francysk Skaryna (18 May 2012)
- People's Artist of Russia Federation (12 February 2008)
- People's Artist of Ukraine (29 May 2008)
- Merited Artist of the Russian Federation (2001)
- People's Artist of Chechnya (2006)
- People's Artist of Ingushetia (2006)
- Honorary Citizen of Yalta (2010)
- Honored Art Activist of Autonomous Republic of Crimea (2000)
- Goodwill ambassador of United Nations (2000)

In November 2024, Kirkorov was revoked of the title of People's Artist of Ukraine, as part of a decree that stripped 34 people labelled as traitors to Ukraine.

Medals

- Medal "10 years of Astana" (Kazakhstan, 2008)

Public awards

- Record holder of the Russian Book of Records (2017)

Awards
World Music Awards
| Preceded by 1995 Dmitry Malikov | Best-Selling Russian Artist; 1996,1999; Philipp Kirkorov | Succeeded by 2000 Kristina Orbakaite |
World Music Awards
| Preceded by 2002 Kristina Orbakaitė | Best-Selling Russian Artist; 2004, 2005; Philipp Kirkorov | Succeeded by 2006 Dima Bilan |
World Music Awards
| Preceded by 2007 Serebro | Best-Selling Russian Artist; 2008; Philipp Kirkorov | Succeeded by 2014 Grigory Leps |

== Discography ==
=== Albums ===
Studio albums

- 1990: Philipp
- 1990: Sinbat-Morehod
- 1991: Nebo I Zemlya
- 1991: Ti, Ti, Ti
- 1992: Takoi Sakoi
- 1994: Ya Ne Raphael
- 1995: Primadonna
- 1995: Ckazi Solncu – "Da"
- 1998: Edinstvenaya
- 1998: Oi, Mama Shika Dam
- 2000: Chelofilia
- 2001: Magico Amor
- 2002: Vlubloniy I Bezumno Odinokiy
- 2003: Neznakomka
- 2007: For You
- 2011: Drugoy – 2 Edition
- 2015: Illyuziya
- 2016: Ya
- 2020: Romany
- 2026: UNO

Live

- 2001: Vchera, Segodnya, Zavtra... (Yesterday, Today, Tomorrow... )

Compilation

- 2003: Luchshie Pesni (The Best Songs)
- 2004: Dueti (Duets)

=== Singles ===
- 1999: Mish`
- 2000: Ogon` I Voda
- 2000: Kilimandzaro
- 2001: Diva
- 2001: Ti Poverish`?
- 2001: Ya Za Tebya Umru
- 2001: Maria
- 2002: Zesrokaya Lubov`
- 2004: Sam P..A?! Ili Kirkorov MAZZDie!!!
- 2005: Kak Sumashedshiy Ya (duet with Sakis Rouvas)
- 2009: Zara

=== Eurovision covers ===
Philipp Kirkorov has covered a few songs which appeared in the Eurovision Song Contest and its national finals, as well as entering a song in his own right. Songs include:

- "Dreamin'" (Ireland 1995 entry) (English and Russian)
- "(I Would) Die for You" (Greece 2001 entry) (English and Russian as "Ya za tebya umru")
- "Diva" (Israel 1998 entry) (English, Hebrew, Spanish and Russian)
- "Go" (United Kingdom 1988 entry) (Russian as "Lish by ty vsegda byla moej")
- "Maria Magdalena" (Croatia 1999 entry) (Russian)
- "Hero" – Charlotte Perrelli (2008 Swedish entry) (Russian as "Novyj geroj")
- "La voix" – Malena Ernman (2009 Swedish entry) (Russian as "Golos", English and French) (with Anna Netrebko)
- "Let's get wild" – Helena Paparizou (2005 Greek National Final) (Russian as "Kaif")
- "Carnaval" – DJ Mendez (2002 Swedish National Final) (Russian)
- "Let your spirit fly" – Jan Johansson & Pernilla Wahlgren (2003 Swedish National Final) (Russian as "Vljublennaja dusha") (with Anastasia Stotskaya)
- "Cara Mia" – Måns Zelmerlöw (2007 Swedish National Final) (Russian as "Koroleva")
- "Playing with Fire" – Paula and Ovi (Romania 2010 entry) (Russian as "Igra s ognem")
- "Hope & Glory" – Måns Zelmerlöw (2009 Swedish National Final) (Russian as "Tyi vsyo uvidish sam")

== Videos ==
| Year | Title | Director | Album |
|---|---|---|---|
| 1988 | "Carmen" | Galina Malyschitskaya | "Philip" |
| 1988 | "You Don't Look at the Clock" | Viktor Cherkasov | "Philip" |
| 1988 | "Sinbad the Sailor" | Vyacheslav Pronin | "Philip" |
| 1989 | "Mona Lisa" | Vadim Korotkov | "Sinbad the Sailor" |
| 1989 | "Twist, Hey!" | Mikhail Libin | "Philip" |
| 1989 | "Plus and Minus" | Larisa Masluyk | "Philip" |
| 1989 | "Christmas Night" | Vyacheslav Brovkin | "Philip" |
| 1990 | "Look Into My Eyes" | Galina Malyschitskaya | "Heaven and Earth" |
| 1990 | "For a Few Warm Days" | Yury Rakshin | "You, you, you" |
| 1990 | "Jealousy" | Natalya Primak | "Heaven and Earth" |
| 1990 | "Atlantis" | Mikhail Makarenkov | "So-and-so" |
| 1990 | "Magdalena" | Natalya Bakhturina | "So-and-so" |
| 1990 | "You, you, you" | Mikhail Makarenkov | "You, you, you" |
| 1991 | "You, you, you" (2 version) | Mikhail Makarenkov | "You, you, you" |
| 1991 | "Heaven and Earth" | Svetlana Anapolskaya | "Heaven and Earth" |
| 1992 | "So-and-so" | Larisa Mikulskaya | "So-and-so" |
| 1992 | "Roses in the Snow" | Mikhail Khleborodov | "So-and-so" |
| 1993 | "You Tell Me, Cherry" | Mikhail Khleborodov | "I Don Rafael" |
| 1993 | "Marina" | Aleksandr Fayfman | "I Don Rafael" |
| 1993 | "Between Summer and Winter" | Alla Pugacheva | "I Don Rafael" |
| 1994 | "Diva" | Alla Pugacheva | "I Don Rafael" |
| 1994 | "I Raise My Glass" | Roman Rodin, Lina Arifulina | "I Don Rafael" |
| 1994 | "Who is Philip" | Roman Rodin | "I Don Rafael" |
| 1994 | "My Birdie" | Sergey Kalvarskiy | "I Don Rafael" |
| 1994 | "Sweetheart" | Oleg Gusev | "Tell the Sun: "Yes!"" |
| 1995 | "Sweetheart" (2 version) | Oleg Gusev | "Tell the Sun: "Yes!"" |
| 1995 | "Look What Summer" | Sergey Kalvarskiy | "Tell the Sun: "Yes!"" |
| 1995 | "Island" | Roman Rodin | "Tell the Sun: "Yes!"" |
| 1995 | "Whether that Be!" | Roman Rodin | "Tell the Sun: "Yes!"" |
| 1995 | "Lullaby Volcano" | Igor Pesotskiy | "Tell the Sun: "Yes!"" |
| 1995 | "I Met a Girl" | Dmitriy Fiks | "With Love to the Only" |
| 1996 | "My Bunny" | Oleg Gusev | "Tell the Sun: "Yes!"" |
| 1996 | "I Am Guilty, Guilty" | Oleg Gusev | "Tell the Sun: "Yes!"" |
| 1996 | "Carnival" | Yevgeny Ginzburg | "Tell the Sun: "Yes!"" |
| 1996 | "Let's Make Up" | Sergey Kalvarsky | "Tell the Sun: "Yes!"" |
| 1996 | "Running On Waves" | Sergey Kalvarsky | "Tell the Sun: "Yes!"" |
| 1996 | "Delilah" | Janik Fayziyev | "With Love to the Only" |
| 1997 | "Little" | Oleg Gusev | "With Love to the Only" |
| 1997 | "Sweetie baranochki" | Janik Fayziyev | "With Love to the Only" |
| 1997 | "The Only" | Oleg Gusev | "With Love to the Only" |
| 1997 | "Left Summer" | Vasily Pichul | "With Love to the Only" |
| 1998 | "Wedding Night" | Filipp Yankovsky | "Tell the Sun: "Yes!"" |
| 1998 | "Nurse" | Oleg Gusev | "With Love to the Only" |
| 1998 | "Sailor" | Oleg Ryaskov | "Wartime Romance" |
| 1998 | "Salma" | Blednov Brothers | "Oh, Mom, Chic Ladies!" |
| 1998 | "Here's What We" | Blednov Brothers | "Oh, Mom, Chic Ladies!" |
| 1998 | "Oh, Mom, Chic Ladies!" | Blednov Brothers | "Oh, Mom, Chic Ladies!" |
| 1998 | "Diva" | Oleg Gusev | "Oh, Mom, Chic Ladies!" |
| 1998 | "Naive" (with Balagan Limited) | Studio "Fly" | "Duets" |
| 1999 | "If Only You Were Waiting For Me" | Oleg Gusev | "With Love to the Only" |
| 1999 | "Go" | Oleg Gusev | TBA |
| 1999 | "Mouse" | Oleg Gusev | "Magico Amor" |
| 1999 | "Bat" | Oleg Gusev | "Magico Amor" |
| 1999 | "Bat" | Oleg Gusev | "Mouse" |
| 1999 | "Maria" | Oleg Gusev | "Oh, Mom, Chic Ladies!" |
| 1999 | "Silk Thread" | Alla Pugacheva | "Oh, Mom, Chic Ladies!" |
| 1999 | "Until We Meet Again" | Alla Pugacheva | "Christmas Meeting" |
| 1999 | "I Promise to Love" | Alla Pugacheva | "Yesterday, Today, Tomorrow and..." |
| 2000 | "Fire and Water" | Sergey Kalvarskiy | "Cinofilia" |
| 2000 | "Rose Red" | Oleg Gusev | "Fire and Water" |
| 2000 | "Sha-La-La" | Roman Rodin | "Yesterday, Today, Tomorrow and..." |
| 2000 | "Chile-chacha" | Brother Blednov | "Kilimanjaro" |
| 2000 | "Dreamer" (with Lou Bega) | Roman Rodin | "Duets" |
| 2000 | "Kilimanjaro" | Sergey Kalvarskiy | "Kilimanjaro" |
| 2000 | "Livin' la Vida Loca" | Oleg Gusev | "Old Songs. PostScript" |
| 2001 | "Pum! Ya me ha dado!" | Oleg Gusev | "Magico Amor" |
| 2001 | "Will You Believe" | Oleg Gusev | "In Love and Incredibly Lonely" |
| 2001 | "I'd Die For You" | Oleg Gusev | "In Love and Incredibly Lonely" |
| 2001 | "I'd Die For You" (Remix) | Oleg Gusev | "I'd Die For You" |
| 2001 | "(I Would) Die For You" | Oleg Gusev | "I'd Die For You" |
| 2001 | "(I Would) Die For You" (Remix) | Oleg Gusev | "I'd Die For You" |
| 2001 | "The Hell Song" | Semyon Gorov | "In Love and Incredibly Lonely" |
| 2002 | "Give Me Freedom" | Andrey Novoselov | "In Love and Incredibly Lonely" |
| 2002 | "Megamix" | Studio "Fly" | "Megamix" |
| 2002 | "Babe" (with Unesyonnye vetrom) | Dmitriy Chijov | "In Love and Incredibly Lonely" |
| 2002 | "Maria-Magdalena" | Oleg Gusev | "In Love and Incredibly Lonely" |
| 2002 | "With Glamor" | Fedor Bondarchuk | "Neznakomka" |
| 2002 | "Cruel Love" | Oleg Gusev | "Neznakomka" |
| 2003 | "Rose Tea" (with Masha Rasputina) | Oleg Gusev | "Neznakomka" |
| 2003 | "Radio-Baby" | Andrey Novoselov | "Neznakomka" |
| 2003 | "Dream" (with Masha Rasputina) | Irina Mironova | "Neznakomka" |
| 2003 | "A Little Sorry" | Oleg Gusev | "Neznakomka" |
| 2003 | "Anyway" | Semyon Gorov | "The Crazy Day or The Marriage of Figaro" |
| 2003 | "Well Why Not" (with Lolita Milyavskaya and Nikolay Gusev) | Semyon Gorov | "Duets" |
| 2003 | "Love-Carrot" (with Anastasiya Stotskaya, Lolita Milyavskaya and Boris Khvoshnyanskiy) | Semyon Gorov | "Duets" |
| 2003 | "Magic Night" | Tina Barkalaya | TBA |
| 2004 | "And You Say" (with Anastasiya Stotskaya) | Oleg Gusev | "Duets" |
| 2004 | "Like Crazy I" (with Sakis Rouvas) | Oleg Gusev | "Like Crazy I" |
| 2004 | "Se Thelo San Trelos" (with Sakis Rouvas) | Oleg Gusev | "Like Crazy I" |
| 2005 | "Metro" | Maksim Papernik | "The Twelve Chairs" |
| 2005 | "The Bar" (with Masha Rasputina) | Irina Mironova | "Duets" |
| 2005 | "Wow!" (with Natalya Mogilevskaya) | Ekaterina Tsarik | "Otpravila Message" |
| 2005 | "The Usual Story" | Semyon Gorov | "For You" |
| 2006 | "The Anthem of the Olympic Games in Sochi" (with Valeriya, Dima Bilan, Sofia Rotaru, Maksim Pokrovsky, Vladimir Presnyakov Jr., Yulia Savicheva and Banda) | Aleksey Rozenberg | TBA |
| 2006 | "Flew" | Oleg Gusev | "For You" |
| 2006 | "High" | Semyon Gorov | "For You" |
| 2007 | "Love is Always Right" (with Chelsea) | Oleg Gusev | "Point of Age" |
| 2008 | "Wanderer" | Oleg Vakulin | "For You" |
| 2009 | "V sadu Edemovom" | Sarik Andreasyan | "DruGOY" |
| 2009 | "Gibnu Ya" | Andriy Novoselov | |
| 2009 | "Love" (with Pavel Volya) | Sarik Andreasyan | |
| 2009 | "It is your illusion" | Rumi Shuazimov | |
| 2009 | "Just give" | Evgeniy Mitrofanov | |
| 2009 | "Strings" | Sarik Andreasyan | |
| 2009 | "Tale of Love" | | |
| 2010 | "Diskopartizany" | Evgeniy Bedarov | |
| 2010 | "Voice" (with Anna Netrebko) | Oleg Gusev | |
| 2010 | "We are so absurd dispersed" | Alan Badoev | |
| 2011 | "Playing with fire" (with Kamaliya) | Endy Soup | |
| 2011 | "Snow" | Alan Badoev | |
| 2011 | "I do not feel sorry for you" | Alan Badoev | |
| 2012 | "I let you go" | Aslan Ahmadov | |
| 2013 | "My joy" | Oleg Gusev | |
| 2014 | "Idol" | Maxim Pasyk | |
| 2015 | "Indigo" | Oleg Gusev | |
| 2016 | "About love" | Oleg Gusev | "Ya" |
| 2016 | "Forgetting" (with Lyubov Uspenskaya) | Oleg Gusev | |
| 2016 | "Bright I" (with Diskoteka Avariya) | Oleg Gusev | |
| 2017 | "Love or Deception?" | Slava Sirbu | "Ya" |
| 2017 | "The Last Spring" (with Timati) | | |
| 2017 | "Chimera" | Oleg Gusev | "Ya" |
| 2018 | "Tsvet Nastroeniya Siniy" | | "Romany" |
| 2018 | "Ibiza" (with Nikolay Baskov) | | |
| 2019 | "Stesnenye Propalo" | | |
| 2019 | "Lunnyy Gost" | | |
| 2020 | "Romany" | | "Romany" |
| 2020 | "Roleks" (with DAVA) | | |
| 2021 | "KOMILFO" (with MARUV) | | |

== Filmography ==
- 1991: "Ischade Ada"
- 1992: "Muzykalnyy Prognoz"
- 1993: "Goryachev I Drugie"
- 1994: "Tysyacha I Odna Noch"
- 1995: "Old Songs About Main Things" (as magician from south)
- 1996: "Karnavalnaya Noch 2"
- 1996: "Old Songs About Main Things – 2" (as Mr. Singer)
- 1997: "Desyat Pesen O Moskve"
- 1997: "Old Songs About Main Things – 3" (as young actor)
- 1999: "33 Kvadratnykh Metra"
- 2000: "Novye Bremenskie"
- 2000: "Salon of Beaty" (as Evgeniy Slavin)
- 2000: "Krylya"
- 2000: "Old Songs About Main Things.Postscript" (as magician from south)
- 2001: "Zhenskoe Schaste"
- 2001: "Como El Cine" (as himself)
- 2001: "Evenings on a Farm Near Dikanka" (as devil)
- 2003: "Crazy Day or The Marriage of Figaro" (as Count Almaviva)
- 2003: "Ostorozhno, Modern! 2004"
- 2005: "Moya Prekrasnaya Nyanya" (as himself)
- 2005: "Noch V Stile Detstva"
- 2005: "Pervyy Skoryy"
- 2006: "The Adventures of Verka Serduchka" (cameo)
- 2006: "Pervyy Doma"
- 2006: "Stars Holidays" (as Baron Star, intergalactic star)
- 2007: "Mechty Alisy"
- 2007: "Yeralash"
- 2007: "Kingdom of Crooked Mirrors" (as kite Piliph)
- 2008: "Krasota Trebuet..."
- 2008: "Goldfish" (as star groom)
- 2008: "On Back Of Black Cat" (cameo)
- 2009: "Love in the Big City" (as Saint Valentin)
- 2009: "Zolotoy Klyuchik"
- 2009: "Kak Kazaki..."
- 2010: "Love in the Big City 2" (as Saint Valentin)
- 2010: "Svaty" (cameo)
- 2010: "Morozko"
- 2010: "Novyy God V Derevne Glukharevo"
- 2011: "Novye Priklyucheniya Aladdina"
- 2011: "Novogodnyaya SMS-ka"
- 2012: "Little Red Riding Hood" (As Cat Basilio)
- 2013: "Tri Bogatyrya"
- 2014: "Love in the Big City 3" (as Saint Valentin)
- 2015: ""
- 2016: "Den D"
- 2017: "Naughty Grandma" (cameo)
- 2018: "Grand"
- 2018: "Babushka Legkogo Povedeniya 2"
- 2018: "Zolushka"
- 2019: "Bolshoe Puteshestvie"
- 2019: "Zhara"
- 2021: "Suvorov. Velikoe Puteshestvie"
- TBA: "Styuardessa"

== Eurovision Song Contest entries ==
Kirkorov is best known for his involvement in several Eurovision Song Contest entries for a range of Eastern European countries. In Eurovision Song Contest media, he is, together with Dimitris Kontopoulos, Fokas Evangelinos, Ilias Kokotos and others, considered to be a member of the so-called Dream Team, a loose group of songwriters and choreographers who regularly collaborate to produce Eurovision Song Contest entries.

Involvement in Eurovision entries
| Year | Country | Song | Artist | Songwriters | Final | Points | Semi | Points |
|---|---|---|---|---|---|---|---|---|
| 1995 | Russia | "Kolybelnaya dlya vulkana" | Philipp Kirkorov | Ilya Bershadskiy, Ilya Reznik | 17 | 17 | No semi-finals | |
| 2007 | Belarus | "Work Your Magic" | Dmitry Koldun | Philipp Kirkorov, Dimitris Kontopoulos, Karen Kavaleryan | 6 | 145 | 4 | 176 |
| 2008 | Ukraine | "Shady Lady" | Ani Lorak | Philipp Kirkorov, Dimitris Kontopoulos, Karen Kavaleryan | 2 | 230 | 1 | 152 |
| 2014 | Russia | "Shine" | Tolmachevy Sisters | Philipp Kirkorov, Dimitris Kontopoulos, John Ballard, Ralph Charlie, Gerard James Borg | 7 | 89 | 6 | 63 |
| 2016 | Russia | "You Are the Only One" | Sergey Lazarev | Philipp Kirkorov, Dimitris Kontopoulos, John Ballard, Ralph Charlie | 3 | 491 | 1 | 342 |
| 2018 | Moldova | "My Lucky Day" | DoReDoS | Philipp Kirkorov, John Ballard | 10 | 209 | 3 | 235 |
| 2019 | Russia | "Scream" | Sergey Lazarev | Philipp Kirkorov, Dimitris Kontopoulos, Sharon Vaughn | 3 | 370 | 6 | 217 |
| 2020 | Moldova | "Prison" | Natalia Gordienko | Dimitris Kontopoulos, Philipp Kirkorov, Sharon Vaughn | Contest cancelled | | | |
| 2021 | Moldova | "Sugar" | Natalia Gordienko | Dimitris Kontopoulos, Phillipp Kirkorov, Mikhail Gutseriyev, Sharon Vaughn | 13 | 115 | 7 | 179 |

== Real estate ==
- Villa in Ostrov Myakinino (Cottage Village Beresta) near Moscow.
- Villa in La Gorce Dr, Miami Beach.

== Public image and controversies ==
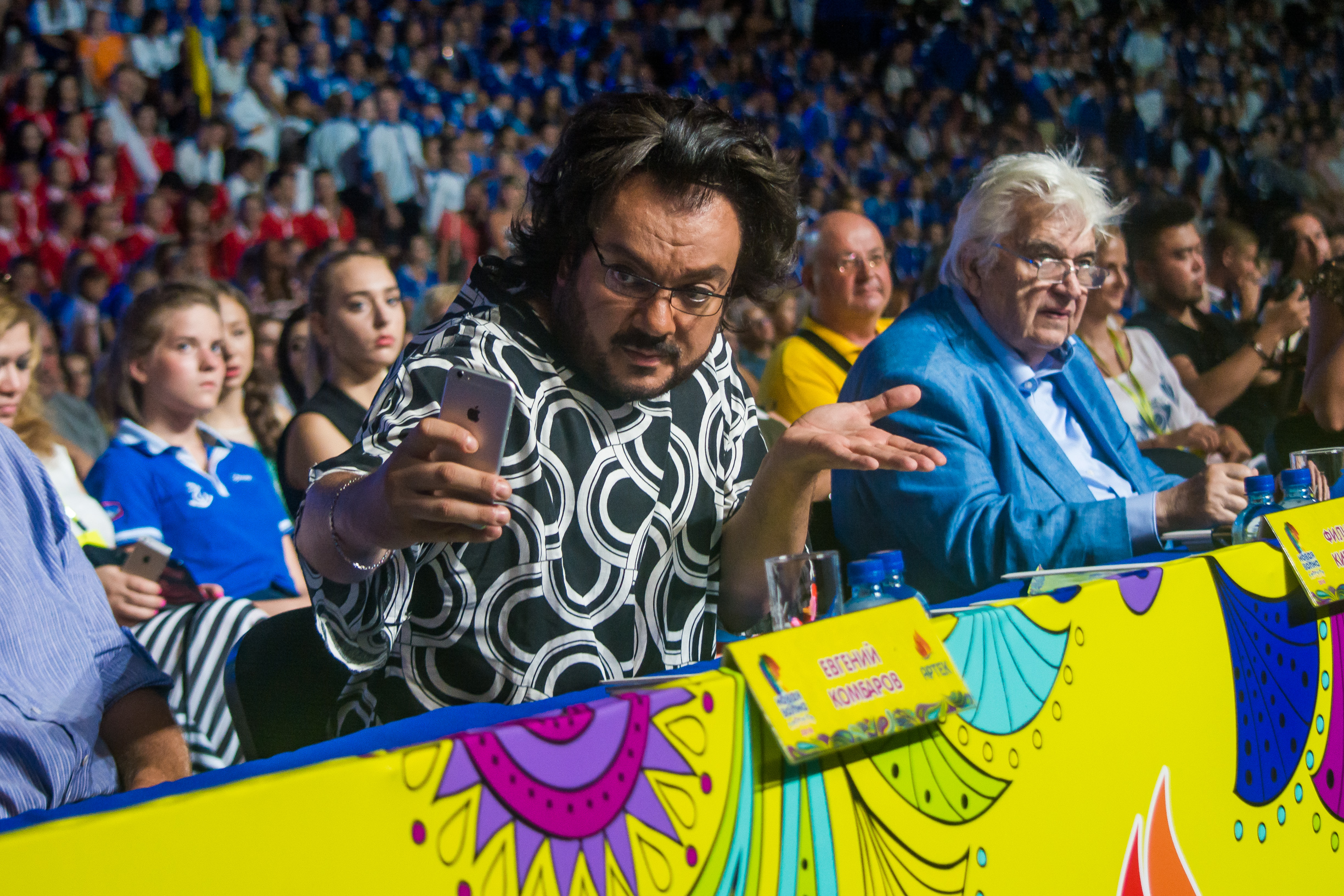
Kirkorov in August 2016

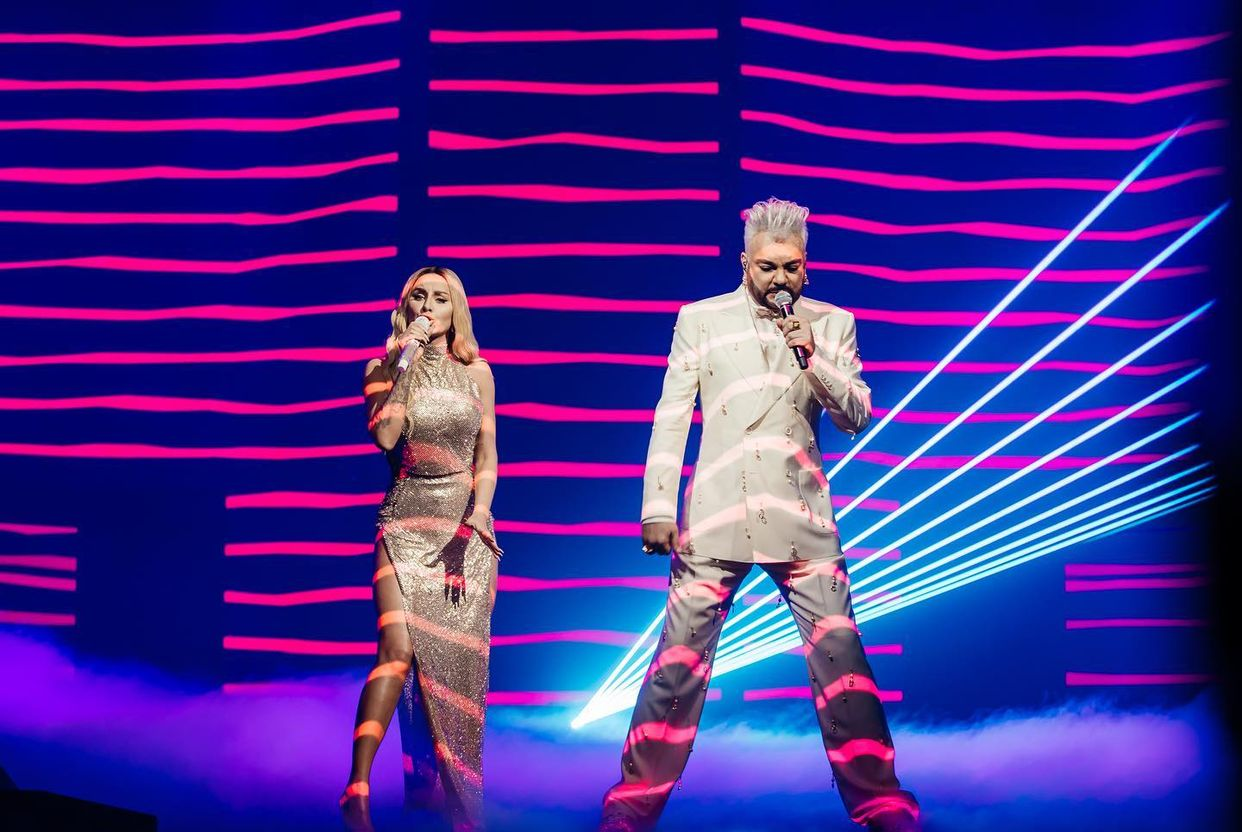
Kirkorov with the Russian-Ukrainian singer Anna Asti in May 2022

Philipp Kirkorov has maintained a "bad boy" public image for most of his career and has been involved in a number of media controversies.

On 20 May 2004, in Rostov-on-Don, Kirkorov insulted journalist Irina Aroyan at a press conference, using obscene language and criticizing her appearance. After demanding she leave, his bodyguards assaulted her and destroyed her tape recorder. The incident sparked widespread media outrage, and on 11 August 2004, Kirkorov was found guilty of insults and fined 60,000 rubles.

Kirkorov sent his guards to attack Yuri Shevchuk, the frontman of the rock band DDT, following a heated public argument. The conflict arose after Shevchuk made offensive comments about Kirkorov, his wife, and accusations of lip-synching. Shevchuk, who did not have guards of his own, was left unprotected during the incident.

On 15 May 2009, Kirkorov resigned as head of the Russian jury for the Eurovision Song Contest 2009 after being seen posing with Greek entrant Sakis Rouvas and dining with Norwegian entrant Alexander Rybak. Kirkorov, a long-time friend of Rouvas, stepped down to preserve the jury's integrity after the incidents became public.

On 3 September 2009, Philipp Kirkorov was caught on camera breaking and seizing a camera belonging to NTV journalist Veronica Kozlova. Charges were not made, and Kirkorov stated that his actions were 'provoked' by the journalist.

Another incident occurred on 4 December 2010, when he allegedly slapped a female assistant because he was unhappy with the lighting at a concert venue. The woman, later identified as Marina Yablokova, threatened to sue Kirkorov. As a result, Kirkorov fled to Israel and had himself interned at a psychiatric hospital. On 7 December 2010, the singer publicly admitted that he had psychological problems on his official website and apologized to Yablokova.

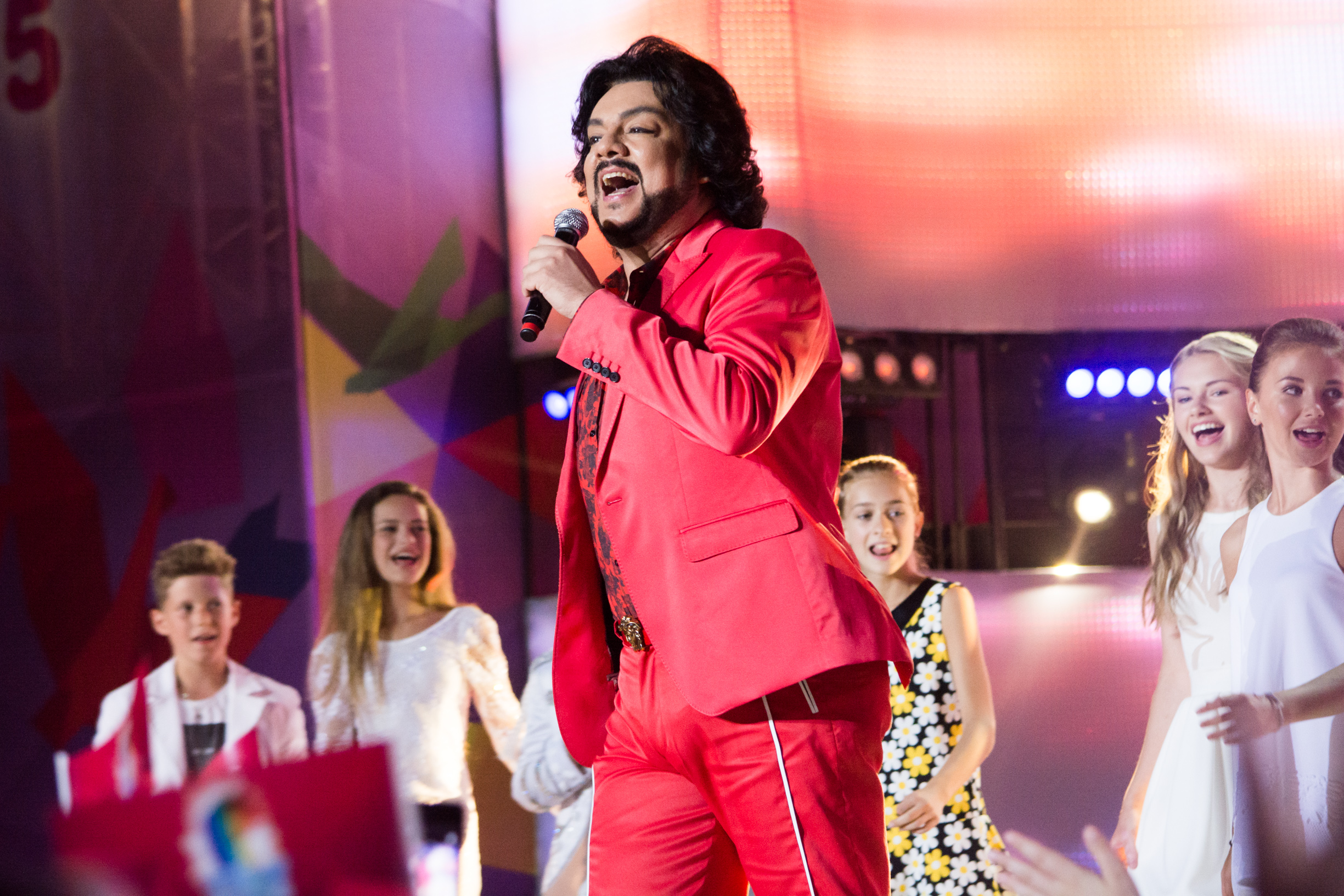
Kirkorov at "New Wave Junior 2015" in Artek

On 29 November 2016, Russian media reported that Didier Marouani had been detained in Moscow by Russian police on charges of extortion and defamation. The charges were based on a complaint by Kirkorov with whom Marouani had a disagreement regarding a copyright infringement case.

In April 2022, Kirkorov criticized RT editor-in-chief Margarita Simonyan for questioning the sexual orientation of Russian comedian and television presenter Maxim Galkin, who fled Russia in protest of the invasion of Ukraine.

=== Party at the Mutabor club in Moscow ===
After attending the controversial "naked" party organized by blogger Nastya Ivleeva at the Moscow club "Mutabor," where guests appeared almost nude, Philip Kirkorov issued an apology. In a video message to fans on VKontakte, he described his attendance as a mistake, stating that his status requires greater responsibility in choosing events. Kirkorov emphasized that he was unaware of the nature of the gathering and promptly left.

Following media coverage of the event, Vitaly Borodin, head of the Federal Project for Security and Anti-Corruption (FPBC), called for Kirkorov to be stripped of his title of People's Artist.

On 27 December, Kirkorov's image was removed from the promotional poster of the film Ivan Vasilyevich Changes Everything! and replaced with comedian Pavel Volya. Television networks also initiated a boycott, editing New Year's programs to exclude Kirkorov's scenes and solo performances.

=== Support for the Russian annexation of Crimea and invasion of Ukraine ===
Due to his public support of Russia's annexation of Crimea in 2014, Lithuania blacklisted Kirkorov on 19 January 2021, preventing him from entering the country for a period of five years. On 23 June, Kirkorov was included in the list of "persons who pose a threat to Ukraine's national security" and was thus banned from entering Ukraine for speaking in support of Russia's annexation of Crimea. Estonia banned the singer from entering the country on 24 February 2022, when Russia invaded Ukraine; Ukraine imposed sanctions on him for promoting Russia in January 2023.

== See also ==
- Russian pop music

== Notes ==
Awards and achievements
| Preceded by Youddiph with "Vechny strannik" | Russia in the Eurovision Song Contest; 1995 | Succeeded by Alla Pugacheva with "Primadonna" |
