= Nikolay Baskov =

Russian opera singer (born 1976)

- Николай Басков
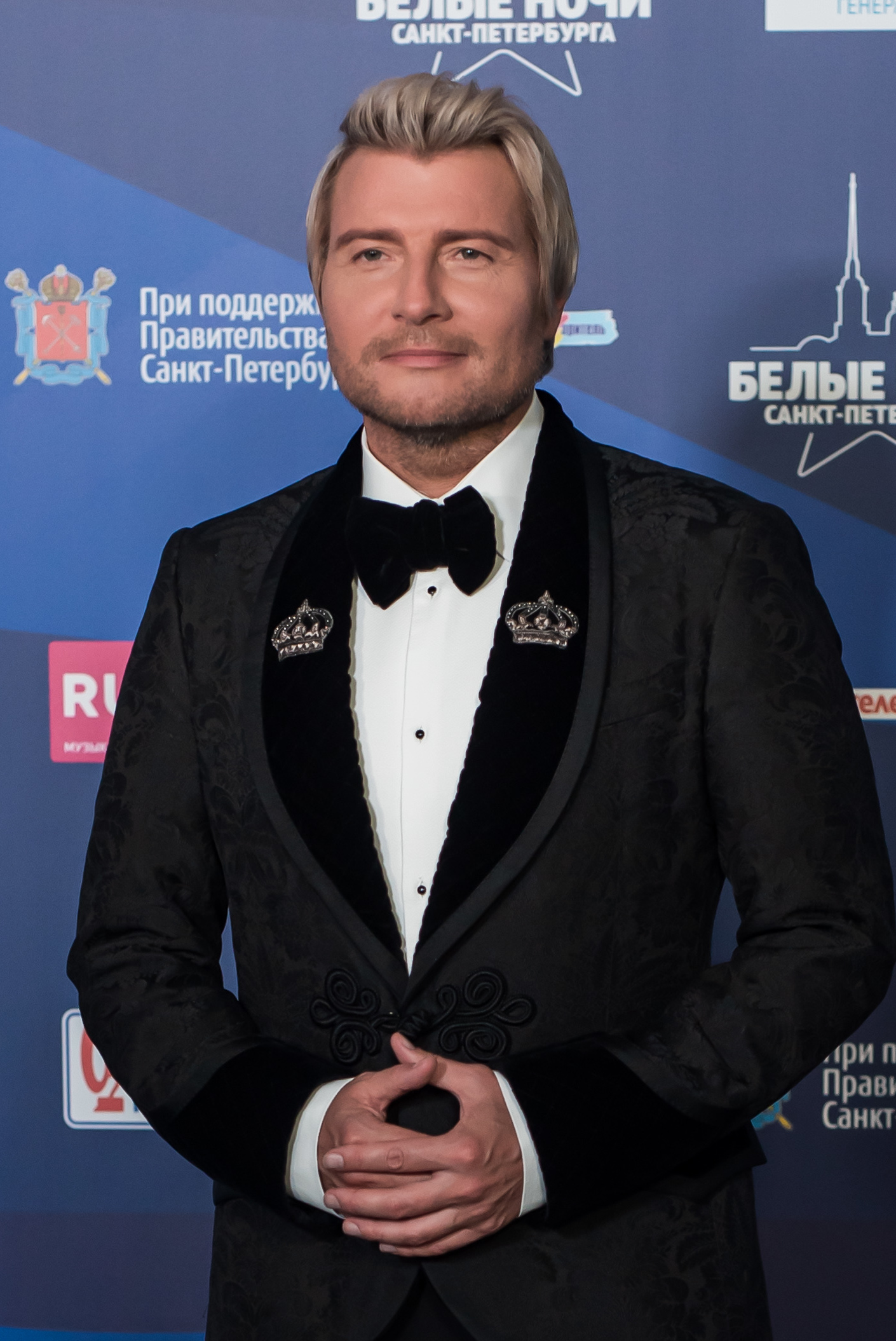
- Baskov in 2021
- Born: Nikolay Baskov; 15 October 1976 (age 49); Balashikha, Russian SFSR, Soviet Union
- Education: Moscow Conservatory, Gnessin State Musical College
- Occupation: Singer
- Years active: 2000–present
- Title: People's Artist of Russia (2009)
- Awards: Order of Friendship (Russia); Order of Francysk Skaryna (Belarus)
- Musical career
- Genres: Classical, opera, Folk, Pop
- Website: baskov.ru

"Korabl sudby"
Sample of "Korabl sudby" by Nikolay Baskov

Nikolay Victorovich Baskov (Russian: Николай Викторович Басков, IPA: [nʲɪkɐˈlaj ˈvʲiktərəvʲɪdʑ ˈbaskəf, - bɐsˈkof]; (Note: While the most common pronunciation of his surname is [ˈbaskəf], with the stress falling on the first syllable, the traditional pronunciation is [bɐsˈkof], with the stress falling on the last syllable.) born 15 October 1976) is a Russian tenor who performs in both operatic and popular-music styles. His honors include commendations as Meritorious Artist and People's Artist of the Russian Federation.

In addition to his career as a vocalist, Baskov appears regularly on the Russian game-show What? Where? When?.

== Biography ==
Baskov studied at the Gnessin Russian Academy of Music and Moscow Conservatory. In 1998, he placed first in the All-Russian Young Singers Competition and placed second in the 1999 Grande Voce competition in Spain.

Released in 2011, the Nikolai Baskov: Romantic Journey concert performance CD/DVD took place at Moscow's Hall of the Luzhniki Stadium. Baskov was accompanied by a full orchestra and played to a crowd of nearly 10,000 people. Taped with 24 HD cameras, this is Russia's most elaborate and expensive performance ever recorded for international television. He performed classic pieces from Tosca, La bohème, Werther, Turandot and other popular songs from his catalogue such as Be My Love, Granada and Back to Sorrento. Baskov is joined by world-renowned soprano, Montserrat Caballé, and her daughter Marti, for several duets.

In early 2012, Baskov embarked on his first American tour.

In December 2012, he signed an open letter against a St. Petersburg bill banning "homosexual propaganda," along with pop stars like Philipp Kirkorov and Dima Bilan.

In March 2022, Baskov openly supported Russia's military aggression and invasion in Ukraine. On 7 March, the Prosecutor General of Ukraine informed Baskov of suspicion of propagandizing war on the territory of Ukraine. The court arrested him in absentia. He claimed "thirty years of unprincipled deception of Russia by the West", accused the United States of trying to "destroy Russia" and said that "claims that NATO is peaceful are a lie". After these statements, the Latvian Ministry of Foreign Affairs announced on 24 March that Baskov would be banned from entering Latvia indefinitely.

== LGBT propaganda ==
In 2023, the Tagansky District Court of Moscow fined the Tochka TV channel 1 million rubles for violating the law prohibiting "LGBT propaganda" among minors by broadcasting Baskov's music video "Strannik", filmed in May 2012. Baskov's lyrical character is depicted with another man against a backdrop described as an "atmosphere of hedonism and debauchery". The video also contains scenes of a sexual nature involving women. According to the court ruling, the video "contains information (visual content) that meets the criteria for demonstrating non-traditional sexual relations and/or preferences".

== Discography ==
- Dedication (Посвящение, 2000)
- Dedication Encore (Посвящение на бис, 2000)
- Masterpieces of the Passing Century (Шедевры уходящего века, 2001)
- I'm 25 (Мне 25, 2001)
- Never Say Goodbye (Никогда не говори прощай, 2004)
- Let Me Go (Отпусти меня, 2005)
- Best Songs (Лучшие песни, 2005)
- Only For You (Тебе одной, 2007)
- Romantic Journey, 2011
- Game (Игра, 2016)

=== Extended plays ===
- Karaoke EP (2020)

== Pesnya goda ==
Year	Final	Title in English
2002	Шарманка, Силы небесные	"Barrel organ, Hosts of Heaven"
2003	Любовь не знает слова "нет"	"Love Does Not Know the Word 'No'"
2004	Ах, эта ночь, Цветет малина, Я буду руки твои целовать	"Oh, This Night, Flowering Raspberry, I Will Kiss Your Hands"
2005	Сердце, Отпусти меня	"A Heart, Let Me Go"
2006	Я знаю, ты далеко	"I Know You're Far Away"
2007	Тебе одной	"You're The One"
2008	Внезапная любовь	"Sudden Love"
2009	Цветы, Права любовь	"Flowers, Love Rights"
2010	Все цветы	"All Flowers"
2011	Сохранив любовь	"Keeping Love"
2012	Странник, Я найду свою любовь	"Wanderer, I'll Find My Love"
2013	Ну кто сказал, Николай	"Well, Who Said, Nikolay"
2014	Вишневая любовь	"Cherry Love"
2015	Ты мое счастье, Любовь – не слова	"You Are My Happiness, Love - Not Words"
2016	Я подарю тебе любовь Обниму тебя	"I will gift you love" "Hug you"
2017	Ждать тебя Твои глаза Маренго	"Wait for you" "Your eyes Marengo"
2018	Мой король Ты сердце мое разбила	"My king" "You broke my heart"
2019	Караоке Ибица	"Karaoke" "Ibiza"
2022	"Давай по-хорошему"	"Let's do it the easy way"

== Honours and awards ==
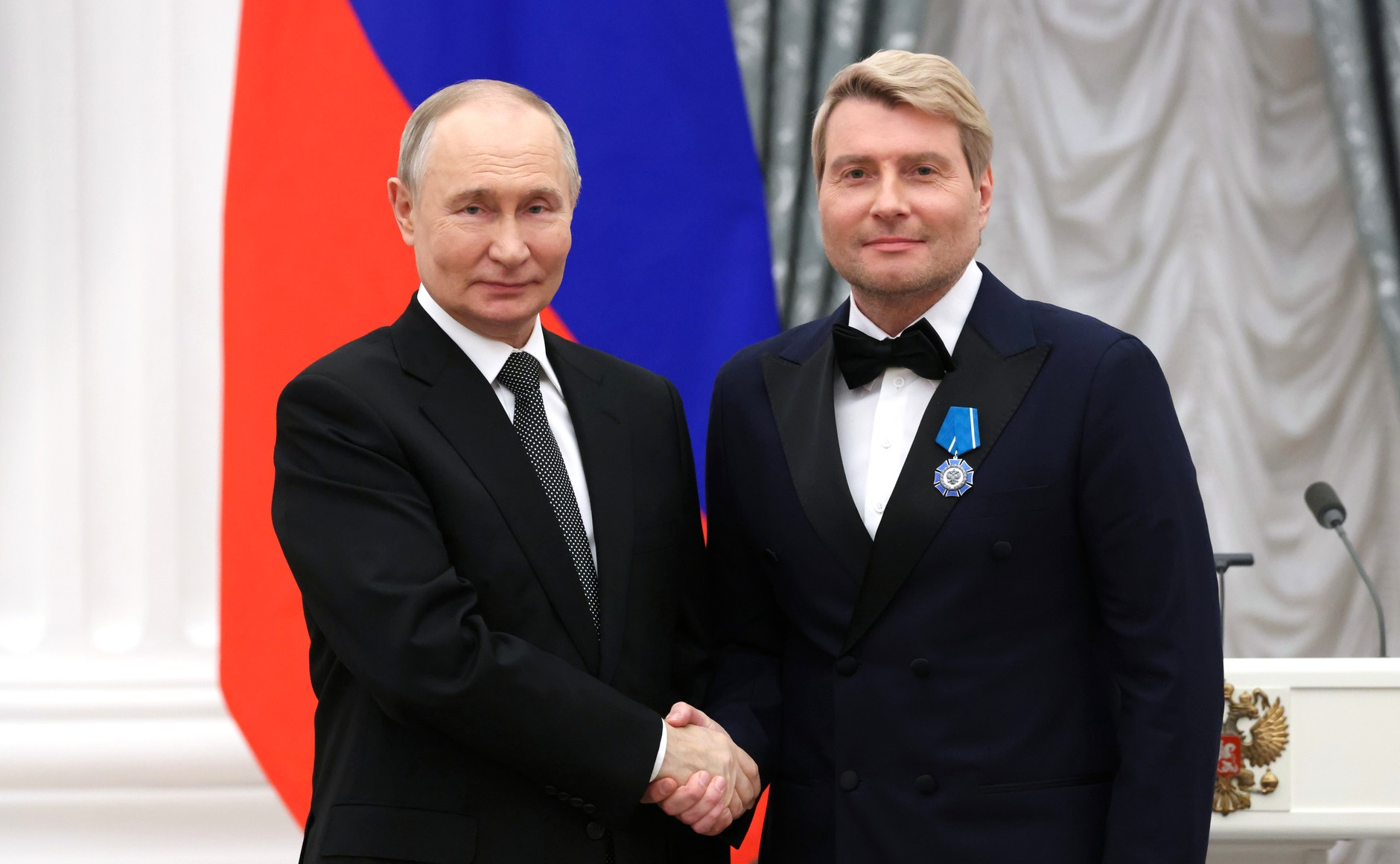
Nikolay Baskov being awarded the Order of Honour from President Vladimir Putin, December 12, 2024

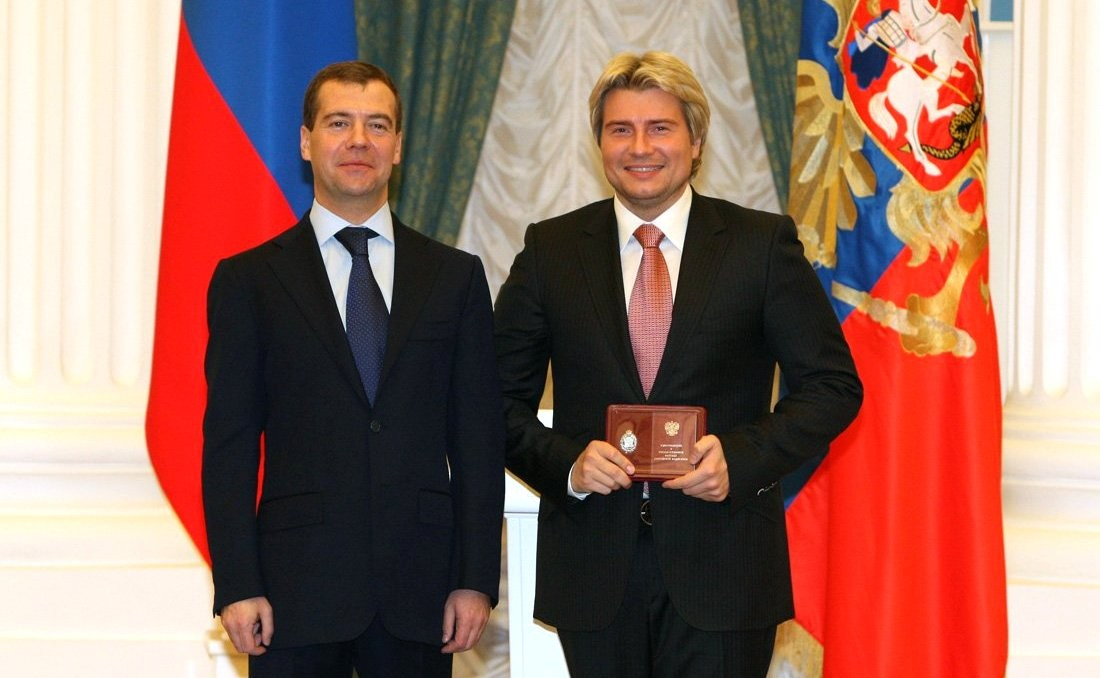
Nikolay Baskov being awarded by People's Artist of the Russian Federation from President Dmitry Medvedev, November 2, 2009

- Order of Honour (2023).
- Medal of the Order "For Merit to the Fatherland," 2nd class (9 December 2006) for achievements in the field of culture and art, and many years of fruitful work
- Honoured Artist of the Russian Federation (6 September 2001) for services to the arts
- People's Artist of Ukraine (November 2004)
- Order of Friendship for a significant contribution to the development of national culture and art, mass media, and many years of fruitful activity

In June 2023 Nikolay Baskov directly involved in Ukraine war. Publicly announced he will give a 1,000,000 RUB to a Russian soldier who destroys a Leopard tank in Ukraine.

In November 2024, Baskov was revoked of the title of People’s Artist of Ukraine, as part of a decree that stripped 34 people labelled as traitors to Ukraine.

=== Sanctions ===
In February 2023 Canada sanctioned Nikolay Baskov for being involved in Russian propaganda and spreading misinformation relating to the 2022 war in Ukraine.

== Critical response ==
Montserrat Caballe: "He sings beautifully. Pop music doesn't hurt him at all. Let him sing as much as he wants... There are very few good singers in the world, not only in pop music, but also in opera. There are far more bad ones".

Artemy Troitsky: "Nikolay Baskov is a spitting image, not an artist at all, not a human being, he's a runner, a backup singer. He's not considered a celebrity anywhere, and he survives only by constantly being an eyesore at all sorts of gigs".

== See also ==
- Operatic pop
