= World Music Awards =

International music awards show held in Monte Carlo

- Awarded for: Record sales; outstanding achievements in the music industry
- Country: World
- First award: 10 May 1989; 37 years ago
- Final award: 27 May 2014; 12 years ago
- Website: worldmusicawards.com

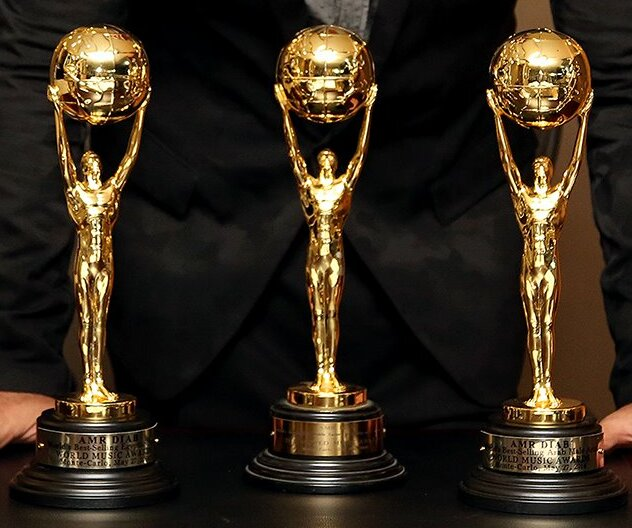
Trophies

The World Music Awards was an international award show founded in 1989 under the patronage of Albert II, Prince of Monaco, and co-founder/executive producer John Martinotti. Most years, the event was held in Monte Carlo. Awards were presented to the world's best-selling artists in several categories and to the best-selling artists from each major territory. Past winners have included Michael Jackson, Whitney Houston, Mariah Carey, Shakira, Gloria Gaynor, Ricky Martin, Jennifer Lopez, and Beyoncé.

The original trophy was a plaque depicting a mermaid, in a presentation case. Between 1990 and 1994, it was a golden treble clef with a globe in the middle. From 1995 on, it was a gold-plated Atlassian figure holding up the Earth above his head.

The event was last held in 2014, though its website remains live. The Global Recording Artist of the Year award, established in 2014 by IFPI, nowadays covers parts of what were the main categories of the World Music Awards.

As of 2026, the official website and social media accounts remain active, focusing on producing digital content.

== Hosts and venues ==
Year	Date	Host	Location	Venue
1989	10 May	Bertín Osborne	Monte Carlo, Monaco	Salle des Étoiles, Monte-Carlo Sporting
1990	9 May	Don Johnson	Monte Carlo, Monaco	Salle des Étoiles, Monte-Carlo Sporting
1991	15 May	David Hasselhoff	Monte Carlo, Monaco	Salle des Étoiles, Monte-Carlo Sporting
1992	14 May	Olivia Newton-John & Cliff Richard	Monte Carlo, Monaco	Salle des Étoiles, Monte-Carlo Sporting
1993	12 May	Michael Douglas	Monte Carlo, Monaco	Salle des Étoiles, Monte-Carlo Sporting
1994	4 May	Patrick Swayze, Prince Albert & Princess Caroline	Monte Carlo, Monaco	Salle des Étoiles, Monte-Carlo Sporting
1995	3 May	Claudia Schiffer & Luke Perry	Monte Carlo, Monaco	Salle des Étoiles, Monte-Carlo Sporting
1996	8 May	Jean-Claude Van Damme & Natalie Cole	Monte Carlo, Monaco	Salle des Étoiles, Monte-Carlo Sporting
1997	17 April	Princess Stéphanie, Jon Bon Jovi & Halle Berry	Monte Carlo, Monaco	Salle des Étoiles, Monte-Carlo Sporting
1998	6 May	Gloria Estefan, Jason Priestley & Daisy Fuentes	Monte Carlo, Monaco	Salle des Étoiles, Monte-Carlo Sporting
1999	5 May	Damon Wayans & Pamela Anderson	Monte Carlo, Monaco	Salle des Étoiles, Monte-Carlo Sporting
2000	10 May	Elle Macpherson & Mark McGrath	Monte Carlo, Monaco	Salle des Étoiles, Monte-Carlo Sporting
2001	2 May	Sisqó & Carmen Electra	Monte Carlo, Monaco	Salle des Étoiles, Monte-Carlo Sporting
2002	6 March	Shaggy, Jennifer Love Hewitt & Mark McGrath	Monte Carlo, Monaco	Salle des Étoiles, Monte-Carlo Sporting
2003	12 October	Vivica A. Fox, Rupert Everett & Anna Kournikova	Monte Carlo, Monaco	Salle des Étoiles, Monte-Carlo Sporting
2004	15 September	Marc Anthony, Hilary Duff & Céline Dion	Las Vegas, USA	Thomas & Mack Center
2005	31 August	James Denton & Carmen Electra	Los Angeles, USA	Kodak Theatre
2006	15 November	Lindsay Lohan	London, UK	Earls Court Exhibition Centre
2007	4 November	Julian McMahon	Monte Carlo, Monaco	Salle des Étoiles, Monte-Carlo Sporting
2008	9 November	Michelle Williams & Jesse Metcalfe	Monte Carlo, Monaco	Salle des Étoiles, Monte-Carlo Sporting
2010	18 May	Hayden Panettiere & Michelle Rodriguez	Monte Carlo, Monaco	Salle des Étoiles, Monte-Carlo Sporting
2014	27 May	Jason Derulo & Pamela Anderson	Monte Carlo, Monaco	Salle des Étoiles, Monte-Carlo Sporting

== Winners ==
=== 1989 ===
- Female Artist of the Year: Belinda Carlisle
- Male Artist of the Year: Steve Winwood
- Group of the Year: Gipsy Kings
- Song of the Year: Milli Vanilli – "Girl You Know It's True"
- Music Video of the Year: Enya – "Orinoco Flow"
- World's Best-Selling French Artist: David Hallyday
- World's Best-Selling Irish Artist: Enya
- World's Best-Selling Italian Artist: Fausto Leali & Anna Oxa
- Legend Award (Outstanding Contribution to the Music Industry): Barry White
- Legend Award (Outstanding Contribution to the Pop Industry): Ringo Starr
- Legend Award (Lifelong Contribution to the Music Industry): Julio Iglesias

=== 1990 ===
- World's Best-Selling African Artist: Johnny Clegg
- World's Best-Selling Australian Artist: Kate Ceberano
- World's Best-Selling Austrian Artist: Rainhard Fendrich
- World's Best-Selling Belgian Artist: Soulsister
- World's Best-Selling Canadian Artist: Jeff Healey Band
- World's Best-Selling Danish Artist: Sanne Salomonsen
- World's Best-Selling Dutch Artist: Gerard Joling
- World's Best-Selling Finnish Artist: Kirka
- World's Best-Selling French Artist: Gipsy Kings
- World's Best-Selling German Artist: Sandra
- World's Best-Selling Greek Artist: Demis Roussos
- World's Best-Selling Irish Artist: Chris de Burgh
- World's Best-Selling Israeli Artist: Ofra Haza
- World's Best-Selling Italian Artist: Pooh
- World's Best-Selling Asian Artist: Southern All Stars
- World's Best-Selling Latin Artist: Luis Miguel
- World's Best-Selling Norwegian Artist: Dance with a Stranger
- World's Best-Selling Portuguese Artist: Amália Rodrigues
- World's Best-Selling Russian Artist: Vladimir Presnyakov Jr.
- World's Best-Selling Spanish Artist: Mecano
- World's Best-Selling Swedish Artist: Jerry Williams
- World's Best-Selling Swiss Artist: Yello
- World's Best-Selling UK Artist: Tanita Tikaram
- Legend Award (Outstanding Contribution to the Music Industry): Bob Geldof
- Legend Award (Outstanding Contribution to the Music Industry): Chris de Burgh
- Legend Award (Outstanding Lifelong Contribution to the Music Industry): David Bowie

=== 1991 ===
- Best-Selling Recording Artist: Phil Collins
- International Newcomers: Londonbeat
- Best-Selling African Recording Artist: Johnny Clegg
- Best-Selling Australian Recording Artist: Kylie Minogue
- Best-Selling Austrian Group: Erste Allgemeine Verunsicherung
- Best-Selling Belgian Group: Technotronic
- Best-Selling British Female Recording Artist: Lisa Stansfield
- Best-Selling Canadian Group: Jeff Healey Band
- Best-Selling Finnish Recording Artist: Kirka
- Best-Selling French Female Recording Artist: Patricia Kaas
- Best-Selling German Recording Artist: Matthias Reim
- Best-Selling Greek Recording Artist: Nana Mouskouri
- Best-Selling Irish Recording Artist: Sinéad O'Connor
- Best-Selling Italian Recording Artist: Gianna Nannini
- Best-Selling Soviet Recording Artist: Valery Leontiev
- Best-Selling Spanish Group: El Último de la Fila
- Best-Selling Swedish Recording Artist: Tomas Ledin
- Legend Award: (Outstanding Contribution to the Pop Industry): Cliff Richard
- Legend Award: (Lifelong Contribution to the Music Industry): Elton John
- Legend Award (Outstanding Contribution to the Rock Industry): Status Quo

=== 1992 ===
Sources:

- International New Artist: Cathy Dennis
- International New Group: C+C Music Factory
- Best-Selling African Artist: Rozalla
- Best-Selling American Artist: Garth Brooks
- Best-Selling Australian Group: INXS
- Best-Selling Austrian Artist: Jazz Gitti & Her Disco Killers
- Best-Selling Belgian Group: Vaya Con Dios
- Best-Selling British Group: Simply Red
- Best-Selling Canadian Female Artist: Céline Dion
- Best-Selling Danish Group: Cut 'N' Move
- Best-Selling Finnish Artist: Arja Koriseva
- Best-Selling French Artist: Patrick Bruel
- Best-Selling German Group: Scorpions
- Best-Selling Greek Artist: Nana Mouskouri
- Best-Selling Irish Artist: Enya
- Best-Selling Italian Artist: Marco Masini
- Best-Selling Japanese Artists: Chage and Aska
- Best-Selling Latin American Artist: Luis Miguel
- Best-Selling New Zealand Artist: Margaret Urlich
- Best-Selling Norwegian Artists: A-ha
- Best-Selling Russian Artist: Oleg Gazmanov
- Best-Selling Spanish Artist: Sergio Dalma
- Best-Selling Swedish Artist: Eva Dahlgren
- Best-Selling Swiss Artist: Andreas Vollenweider
- Legend Award (Outstanding Contribution to the Rock Industry): INXS
- Legend Award (Outstanding Contribution to the Music Industry): Olivia Newton-John

=== 1993 ===
Sources:

- World's Best-Selling Pop and Overall Artist: Michael Jackson
- World's Best-Selling Classical Artist: Luciano Pavarotti
- World's Best-Selling Country Artist: Garth Brooks
- World's Best-Selling Hard Rock Artist: Guns N' Roses
- World's Best-Selling Rock Artist: Eric Clapton
- International New Artist: Billy Ray Cyrus
- International New Group of the Year: Boyz II Men
- World's Best-Selling African Artist: Dr. Alban
- World's Best-Selling American Artist: Michael Jackson
- World's Best-Selling Australian Artists: INXS
- World's Best-Selling Belgian Artists: Vaya Con Dios
- World's Best-Selling British Artist: Eric Clapton
- World's Best-Selling Canadian Artist: Bryan Adams
- World's Best-Selling Danish Recording Artist: Hanne Boel
- World's Best-Selling Dutch Artists: 2 Unlimited
- World's Best-Selling French Artist: Mylène Farmer
- World's Best-Selling German Artist: Westernhagen
- World's Best-Selling Greek Artist: Yanni
- World's Best-Selling Irish Artist: U2
- World's Best-Selling Italian Artist: Zucchero Fornaciari
- World's Best-Selling Latin American Artist: Jon Secada
- World's Best-Selling Japanese Artists: Chage and Aska
- World's Best-Selling Norwegian Artists: A-ha
- World's Best-Selling Russian Artist: Laima Vaikule
- World's Best-Selling Spanish Artist: Julio Iglesias
- World's Best-Selling Swedish Artist: ABBA
- World's Best-Selling Swiss Artist: Stephan Eicher
- Legend Award (Lifelong Contribution to Classical Music): Luciano Pavarotti
- Legend Award (World's Best-Selling Artist of the Era): Michael Jackson
- Legend Award (Lifelong Contribution to the Rock Industry): Rod Stewart
- Legend Award (Lifelong Contribution to the Music Industry): Tina Turner

=== 1994 ===
Sources:

- World's Best-Selling Overall Recording Artist: Whitney Houston
- World's Best-Selling Country Artist: Garth Brooks
- World's Best-Selling Hard Rock Artist: Meat Loaf
- World's Best-Selling Jazz Artist: Kenny G
- World's Best-Selling Latin Recording Artist: Gloria Estefan
- World's Best-Selling Pop Artist: Whitney Houston
- World's Best-Selling Pop Newcomers: Ace of Base
- World's Best-Selling R&B Artist: Whitney Houston
- World's Best-Selling R&B Newcomer: Toni Braxton
- World's Best-Selling Rock Artist: Eric Clapton
- World's Best-Selling Rock Newcomers: Spin Doctors
- World's Best-Selling African Recording Artist: Dr. Alban
- World's Best-Selling American Recording Artist: Whitney Houston
- World's Best-Selling Asian Recording Artists: Chage and Aska
- World's Best-Selling Australian Recording Artists: Crowded House
- World's Best-Selling Benelux Recording Artists: 2 Unlimited
- World's Best-Selling British Recording Artist: Eric Clapton
- World's Best-Selling Canadian Recording Artist: Bryan Adams
- World's Best-Selling French Recording Artist: Jordy
- World's Best-Selling German Recording Artists: Scorpions
- World's Best-Selling Greek Recording Artist: Yanni
- World's Best-Selling Irish Recording Artists: U2
- World's Best-Selling Italian Recording Artist: Eros Ramazzotti
- World's Best-Selling Russian Recording Artist: Alexander Malinin
- World's Best-Selling Scandinavian Recording Artists: Ace of Base
- World's Best-Selling Spanish Recording Artist: Miguel Bosé
- World's Best-Selling Swiss Recording Artist: Stephan Eicher
- Legend Award (Lifelong Contribution to Classical Music): Plácido Domingo
- Legend Award (Outstanding Contribution to the Pop Industry): Prince
- Legend Award (Lifelong Contribution to the Music Industry): Ray Charles
- Legend Award (World's Best-Selling Female Recording Artist of the Era): Whitney Houston

=== 1995 ===
Sources:

- World's Best-Selling Female Artist: Céline Dion
- World's Best-Selling Pop Artist: Mariah Carey
- World's Best-Selling Pop Group: Ace of Base
- World's Best-Selling Pop Newcomer: Sheryl Crow
- World's Best-Selling R&B Artist: Boyz II Men
- World's Best-Selling Country Artist: Garth Brooks
- World's Best-Selling Jazz Artist: Tony Bennett
- World's Best-Selling Latin Artist: Luis Miguel
- World's Best-Selling Rock Artist: Bon Jovi
- World's Best-Selling African Artist: Youssou N'Dour
- World's Best-Selling Australian Artist: INXS
- World's Best-Selling Benelux Artist: 2 Unlimited
- World's Best-Selling Canadian Artist: Bryan Adams
- World's Best-Selling French-Canadian Artist: Céline Dion
- World's Best-Selling French Artist: Patricia Kaas
- World's Best-Selling German Artist: Westernhagen
- World's Best-Selling Greek Artist: Yanni
- World's Best-Selling Irish Artist: The Cranberries
- World's Best-Selling Italian Artist: Laura Pausini
- World's Best-Selling Japanese Artist: TRF
- World's Best-Selling Russian Artist: Dmitry Malikov
- World's Best-Selling Scandinavian Artist: Ace of Base
- World's Best-Selling Spanish Artist: Benedictine Monks of Santo Domingo de Silos
- World's Best-Selling Swiss Artist: DJ BoBo
- World's Best-Selling UK Artist: Pink Floyd
- World's Best-Selling US Artist: Mariah Carey
- Legend Award: Stevie Wonder
- Legend Award: Tony Bennett

=== 1996 ===
Sources:

- World's Overall Best-Selling Male Recording Artist: Michael Jackson
- World's Overall Best-Selling Female Recording Artist: Mariah Carey
- World's Overall Best-Selling Group: Hootie & the Blowfish
- World's Best-Selling Male Country Artist: Garth Brooks
- World's Best-Selling Female Country Artist: Shania Twain
- World's Best-Selling Latin Artist: Selena
- World's Best-Selling Latin Group: Mamonas Assassinas
- World's Best-Selling Male Pop Artist: Michael Jackson
- World's Best-Selling Female Pop Artist: Mariah Carey
- World's Best-Selling Pop Group: TLC
- World's Best-Selling Male R&B Artist: Michael Jackson
- World's Best-Selling Female R&B Artist: Mariah Carey
- World's Best-Selling R&B Group: TLC
- World's Best-Selling Rap Artist: Coolio
- World's Best-Selling Female Rock Artist: Alanis Morissette
- World's Best-Selling Rock Artist/Group: Hootie & the Blowfish
- World's Best-Selling Female New Artist: Alanis Morissette
- World's Best-Selling Newcomers: Hootie & the Blowfish
- World's Best-Selling African Recording Artist: Lucky Dube
- World's Best-Selling American Group: Hootie & the Blowfish
- World's Best-Selling American Male Recording Artist: Michael Jackson
- World's Best-Selling American Female Recording Artist: Mariah Carey
- World's Best-Selling Australian Recording Artist: Tina Arena
- World's Best-Selling Benelux Recording Artist: André Rieu
- World's Best-Selling British Recording Artist: Seal
- World's Best-Selling Canadian Recording Artist: Céline Dion
- World's Best-Selling Chinese Recording Artist: Jacky Cheung
- World's Best-Selling French Group: Deep Forest
- World's Best-Selling German Group: Real McCoy
- World's Best-Selling Italian Recording Artist: Zucchero Fornaciari
- World's Best-Selling Russian Recording Artist: Philipp Kirkorov
- World's Best-Selling Scandinavian Artist/Group: Ace of Base
- World's Best-Selling Spanish Group: Los del Rio
- World's Best-Selling Swiss Recording Artist: DJ BoBo
- World's Best-Selling Album of All Time: Michael Jackson – Thriller
- Legend Award (Lifelong Contribution to the Music Industry): Diana Ross

=== 1997 ===
Sources:

- World's Overall Best-Selling Recording Artist: Céline Dion
- World's Overall Best-Selling Group: Fugees
- World's Best-Selling Alternative Artist: Alanis Morissette
- World's Best-Selling Alternative Group: Oasis
- World's Best-Selling Classical Artist: Vanessa-Mae
- World's Best-Selling Female Newcomers: Spice Girls
- World's Best-Selling Jazz Artist: Kenny G
- World's Best-Selling Latin Group: Los del Rio
- World's Best-Selling Latin Recording Artist: Julio Iglesias
- World's Best-Selling Male Newcomer: Robert Miles
- World's Best-Selling Pop Artist: Céline Dion
- World's Best-Selling Pop Group: Fugees
- World's Best-Selling R&B Artists: Fugees
- World's Best-Selling Rap Artists: Fugees
- World's Best-Selling Rock Artist: Alanis Morissette
- World's Best-Selling Rock Group: Oasis
- World's Best-Selling African Recording Artist: Khaled
- World's Best-Selling American Recording Artists: Fugees
- World's Best-Selling Australian Recording Artist: Peter Andre
- World's Best-Selling Benelux Recording Artist: Helmut Lotti
- World's Best-Selling Brazilian Group: Carrapicho
- World's Best-Selling British Recording Artists: Oasis
- World's Best-Selling Canadian Recording Artist: Céline Dion
- World's Best-Selling Chinese Recording Artist: Jacky Cheung
- World's Best-Selling French Recording Artist: Florent Pagny
- World's Best-Selling German Recording Artists: Die Toten Hosen
- World's Best-Selling Greek Recording Artist: Vangelis
- World's Best-Selling Irish Recording Artists: The Cranberries
- World's Best-Selling Italian Recording Artist: Eros Ramazzotti
- World's Best-Selling Japanese Recording Artist: Namie Amuro
- World's Best-Selling Russian Group: Agatha Christie
- World's Best-Selling Scandinavian Recording Artists: Ace of Base
- World's Best-Selling Spanish Group: Los del Rio
- World's Best-Selling Swiss Recording Artist: DJ BoBo
- Legend Award (Lifelong Contribution to the Music Industry): Bee Gees
- Legend Award (Lifelong Contribution to the Pop Industry): Lionel Richie

=== 1998 ===
Sources:

- World's Best-Selling R&B Artist: Mariah Carey
- World's Best-Selling Rap Artist: Puff Daddy
- World's Best-Selling Pop Artist/Group: Spice Girls
- World's Best-Selling Rock Artist/Group: No Doubt
- World's Best-Selling Dance Artist/Group: Backstreet Boys
- World's Best-Selling Country Artist: LeAnn Rimes
- World's Best-Selling Latin Artist: Luis Miguel
- World's Best-Selling Latin Female Artist: Shakira
- World's Best-Selling Classical Artist: Andrea Bocelli
- World's Best-Selling New Artist: Puff Daddy
- World's Best-Selling New Group: Hanson
- World's Best-Selling African Artist/Group: Wes
- World's Best-Selling American Artist/Group: LeAnn Rimes
- World's Best-Selling Australian Artist/Group: Savage Garden
- World's Best-Selling Benelux Artist/Group: André Rieu
- World's Best-Selling Brazilian Artist/Group: Só Pra Contrariar
- World's Best-Selling British Artist/Group: Spice Girls
- World's Best-Selling Canadian Artist/Group: Céline Dion
- World's Best-Selling Eastern European Artist/Group: Golden Ring
- World's Best-Selling French Artist: Pascal Obispo
- World's Best-Selling French Album: Era
- World's Best-Selling German Artist/Group: Tic Tac Toe
- World's Best-Selling Greek Artist/Group: Yanni
- World's Best-Selling Irish Artist/Group: U2
- World's Best-Selling Italian Artist/Group: Andrea Bocelli
- World's Best-Selling Japanese Artist/Group: Glay
- World's Best-Selling Middle Eastern Artist/Group: Amr Diab
- World's Best-Selling Scandinavian Artist/Group: Aqua
- World's Best-Selling Spanish Artist/Group: Monica Naranjo
- World's Best-Selling Swiss Artist/Group: DJ BoBo
- Legend Award (World's Best-Selling Recording Artist of the '90s): Mariah Carey

=== 2000 ===
Sources:

- World's Best-Selling Pop Male Artist: Ricky Martin
- World's Best-Selling Pop Female Artist: Britney Spears
- World's Best-Selling Pop Group: Backstreet Boys
- World's Best-Selling Latin Artist: Ricky Martin
- World's Best-Selling Dance Group: Backstreet Boys
- World's Best-Selling R&B Artist: Mariah Carey
- World's Best-Selling R&B Group: Backstreet Boys
- World's Best-Selling Reggae Artist/Group: Bob Marley vs. Funkstar De Luxe
- World's Best-Selling New Male Artist: Lou Bega
- World's Best-Selling New Female Artist: Christina Aguilera
- World's Best-Selling African Artist: Femi Kuti
- World's Best-Selling American Group: Backstreet Boys
- World's Best-Selling Arabic Artist/Group: Taha, Khaled, Faudel
- World's Best-Selling Asian Artist: Hikaru Utada
- World's Best-Selling Australian Recording Artist: Tina Arena
- World's Best-Selling Australian Group: Savage Garden
- World's Best-Selling Benelux Group: Vengaboys
- World's Best-Selling British Artist/Group: Jamiroquai
- World's Best-Selling Canadian Artist: Céline Dion
- World's Best-Selling French Recording Artist/Group: Notre-Dame de Paris
- World's Best-Selling German Artist: Lou Bega
- World's Best-Selling Greek Artist: Notis Sfakianakis
- World's Best-Selling Irish Recording Artist: Ronan Keating
- World's Best-Selling Italian Group: Eiffel 65
- World's Best-Selling Russian Recording Artist: Kristina Orbakaite
- World's Best-Selling Scandinavian Artist/Group: Roxette
- World's Best-Selling Swiss Recording Artist: DJ BoBo
- Best-Selling Pop Male Artist of the Millennium: Michael Jackson
- Best-Selling Pop Female Artist of the Millennium: Mariah Carey

=== 2002 ===
Sources:

- World's Best-Selling Male Artist: Shaggy
  - Nominees: Enrique Iglesias, Robbie Williams, Michael Jackson
- World's Best-Selling Female Artist: Enya
  - Nominees: Britney Spears, Dido, Alicia Keys
- World's Best-Selling Group: Destiny's Child
- World's Best-Selling New Artist: Alicia Keys
  - Nominees: Nelly Furtado, Gorillaz
- World's Best-Selling R&B Male Artist: Shaggy
- World's Best-Selling R&B Female Artist: Alicia Keys
- World's Best-Selling R&B Group: Destiny's Child
- World's Best-Selling Classical Artist: Andrea Bocelli
- World's Best-Selling Dance Artist: Dido
- World's Best-Selling Dance Group: Destiny's Child
- World's Best-Selling Latin Male Artist: Enrique Iglesias
- World's Best-Selling Latin Female Artist: Jennifer Lopez
- World's Best-Selling New Age Artist: Enya
- World's Best-Selling Pop Male Artist: Shaggy
- World's Best-Selling Pop Female Artist: Dido
- World's Best-Selling Pop Group: Destiny's Child
  - Nominees: Backstreet Boys, NSYNC
- World's Best-Selling Rap Artist: Ja Rule
  - Nominees: Eminem, Jay-Z
- World's Best-Selling Rap Group: Outkast
- World's Best-Selling Rock Artist: Linkin Park
- World's Best-Selling Australian Artist: Kylie Minogue
- World's Best-Selling Chinese Artist: Nicholas Tse
- World's Best-Selling French Artist: Alizée
- World's Best-Selling German Artist: Michael Cretu
- World's Best-Selling German Group: No Angels
- World's Best-Selling Greek Artist: Despina Vandi
- World's Best-Selling Italian Artist: Andrea Bocelli
- World's Best-Selling Japanese Artist: Ayumi Hamasaki
- World's Best-Selling Middle Eastern Artist: Amr Diab
- World's Best-Selling Russian Artist: Kristina Orbakaitė
- World's Best-Selling Swiss Artist: DJ BoBo
- Legend Award: Gloria Gaynor

== Special awards ==
=== Legend Award ===
The Legend Award (also called Award for Outstanding Contribution) honored top recording artists who had made outstanding contributions to the music industry. Notable winners of the award included:

- Barry White (1989)
- Bee Gees (1997)
- Beyoncé (2008)
- Bob Geldof (1990)
- Carlos Santana (2005)
- Céline Dion (2007)
- Chaka Khan (2003)
- Cher (1999)
- Chris de Burgh (1990)
- Cliff Richard (1991)
- Clive Davis (2004)
- David Bowie (1990)
- Deep Purple (2008)
- Destiny's Child (2005)
- Diana Ross (1996)
- Elton John (1991)
- Flo Rida (2014)
- George Benson (2003)
- Gloria Gaynor (2002)
- INXS (1992)
- Janet Jackson (1999)
- Jennifer Lopez (2010)
- Julio Iglesias
- L.A. Reid (2008)
- Laura Pausini (2014)
- Lionel Richie (1997)
- Luciano Pavarotti (1993)
- Mariah Carey (1998)
- Mary J. Blige (2006)
- Michael Jackson (1993)
- Olivia Newton-John (1992)
- Patti LaBelle (2007)
- Placido Domingo (1994)
- Prince (1994)
- Ray Charles (1994)
- Ricky Martin (2014)
- Ringo Starr (1989)
- Rod Stewart (1993)
- The Rolling Stones (2005)
- Sakis Rouvas (2014)
- Scorpions (2010)
- Status Quo (1991)
- Stevie Wonder (1995)
- Tina Turner (1993)
- Tony Bennett (1995)
- Whitney Houston (1994)

=== Diamond Award ===
The Diamond Award honored top-selling artists who had been certified as selling over 100,000,000 albums throughout their career. It was awarded to six recipients:

- 2001: Rod Stewart
- 2003: Mariah Carey
- 2004: Céline Dion
- 2005: Bon Jovi
- 2006: Michael Jackson
- 2008: The Beatles/Ringo Starr

=== Millennium Award ===
Two special awards were presented in 2000 to honor the best-selling recording artists at that time. The awards were presented to Michael Jackson and Mariah Carey in the male and female artist award categories, respectively.

== Charity ==
In the early years, proceeds from the show went to the Princess Grace Foundation for humanitarian and cultural charity. In later years, each edition of the World Music Awards built a hospital, school, or orphanage through the Monaco Aide et Presence Foundation and/or the Combonian Missionary Association, which both assist underdeveloped areas in Africa, Asia, the Caribbean, and South America. There are 23 operational centres still saving lives and providing shelter and education for those in need:

Hospitals

- Phulbani, India
- Rominh, Cambodia
- Port-Bouët, Abidjan, Ivory Coast – serves a population of over 170,000 inhabitants
- Butare, Rwanda
- Ed Daein, Sudan
- Rwarangabo, Burundi (health centre)
- Kiota, Niger
- Akamasoa, Madagascar
- Mokattam, Egypt – complete renovation and extension of existing hospital
- Maroa, Venezuela (health centre)

Schools

- Coimbatore, India
- Zebizekou, Ivory Coast
- Songon, Ivory Coast
- Kankelena, Mali
- Fetabanoye, Niger
- Akamasoa, Madagascar

Homes

- Coimbatore, India – two homes for abandoned children
- Kalutara, Sri Lanka – home for handicapped girls
- Yaoundé, Cameroon
- Akamasoa, Madagascar – twelve homes
- Nova Iguaçu, Rio de Janeiro, Brazil – home for abandoned children
- St. Louis, Haiti

World Music Awards has also paid for five wells to provide clean water in Africa.

== See also ==
- Ampex Golden Reel Award
