= 1999 World Music Awards =

11th award event

The 1999 World Music Awards (11th Annual World Music Awards) were held in Monaco on May 5, 1999, and later broadcast on ABC on May 20. Will Smith was the most awarded artist of the night, winning four awards. Lauryn Hill followed with three wins, including Best-Selling New Artist. The evening was hosted by Damon Wayans and Pamela Anderson. Among the musical performers were Tyrese, Jennifer Paige, Alejandro Sanz, Meja, Philipp Kirkorov, Des'ree, The Corrs, Ricky Martin, Barenaked Ladies, Modern Talking, Lara Fabian, Tarkan, three singers from Notre-Dame de Paris, Britney Spears and Cher.

== Genre awards ==
- World's Best-Selling Pop Male Artist: Will Smith
- World's Best-Selling Pop Female Artist: Céline Dion
- World's Best-Selling Dance Male Artist: Will Smith
- World's Best-Selling Dance Group: Backstreet Boys
- World's Best-Selling Latin Artist: Ricky Martin
  - Nominees: Marcelo Rossi, Terra Samba
- World's Best-Selling R&B Male Artist: Will Smith
  - Nominees: Puff Daddy, Usher
- World's Best-Selling R&B Female Artist: Lauryn Hill
  - Nominees: Brandy, Janet Jackson
- World's Best-Selling Rap Male Artist: Will Smith
  - Nominees: Puff Daddy, Usher
- World's Best-Selling Rap Female Artist: Lauryn Hill
- World's Best-Selling New Artist: Lauryn Hill

== Regional awards ==
- World's Best-Selling Asian Group: B'z
- World's Best-Selling Benelux Artist: Lara Fabian
- World's Best-Selling British Female Artist: Des'ree
- World's Best-Selling Canadian Group: Barenaked Ladies
- World's Best-Selling French Group: Notre-Dame de Paris
- World's Best-Selling German Group: Modern Talking
- World's Best-Selling Irish Group: The Corrs
- World's Best-Selling Italian Group: 883
- World's Best-Selling Russian Artist: Philipp Kirkorov
- World's Best-Selling Female Scandinavian Artist: Meja
- World's Best-Selling Spanish Artist: Alejandro Sanz
- World's Best-Selling Swiss Artist: DJ BoBo
- World's Best-Selling Turkish Artist: Tarkan
- World's Best-Selling US Artist: Garth Brooks

== Legend awards ==
- Outstanding Contribution to the Music Industry: Cher
- Outstanding Contribution to the Pop Industry: Janet Jackson
