= Gennady Vetrov =

Soviet and Russian satirist and singer (born 1958)

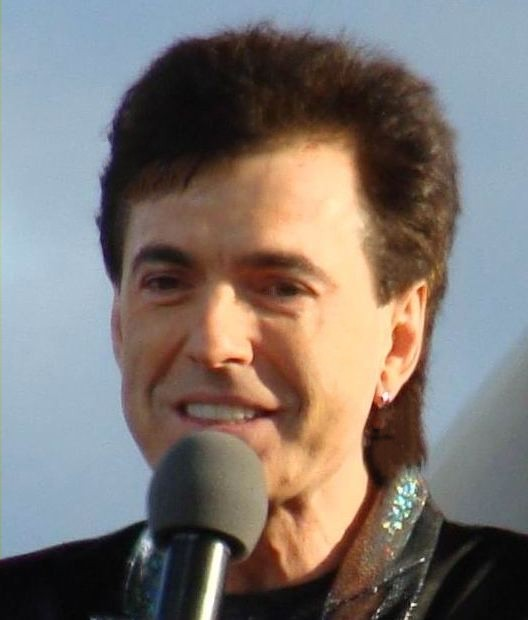
- Vetrov in 2009
- Born: Gennady Anatolyevich Vetrov; November 18, 1958 (age 67); Makiivka, Soviet Union

Comedy career
- Genre: Satire
- Website: vetrov-show.ru

Gennady Anatolyevich Vetrov (Russian: Генна́дий Анато́льевич Ве́тров; born November 18, 1958) is a Soviet and Russian satirist, humorist, singer, and Honored Artist of Russia (August 9, 2009).

== Biography ==
Gennady Vetrov was born on November 18, 1958, in Makiyivka (Donetsk Oblast) in the family of a former coal miner who became a hairdresser. He has graduated from Makiivka Civil Engineering Institute.

In 1988 he graduated from the acting and directing course in LGITMiK. He has worked in the theater "Buff", toured the United States, Switzerland, Germany and France. He worked for several years in Germany. In 1992 he gave 33 recitals in the United States. Vetrov took part in various television programs including "Wider Circle", "Full House", "Piano in the bush", "Fun". he has been a host on television programs "Piano in the bush", "Wider Circle", "Funny People".

The founder and leader of the pop group "Vetrov's people" (in Russian it sounds like "Windy people").

=== Personal life ===
- First wife — businesswoman Anastasia Smolina (involved in the organization of holidays).
  - A daughter — actress Ksenia Vetrova (born August 5, 1993).
- Second wife — actress Karina Zvereva (to 2011).
- Third wife — stewardess Oksana Voronicheva from Arkhangelsk.
  - A daughter — Mary Vetrova (1 June 2016).

== Filmography ==
Year	Film title	Original title	Role
1992	Racket	Рэкет	clown
1992	The Alaska Kid	Аляска Кид	teller
1998	Streets of Broken Lights	Улицы разбитых фонарей	Eduard Sergeyevich
2007	Bloody Mary	Кровавая Мэри	sergeant
2008	It's Not Forbidden to Live a Nice Life	Красиво жить не запретишь	sailor
2009	Golden Key	Золотой ключик	a visiting guest performer
2009	Little Red Riding Hood	Красная шапочка	tourist
