= 2004 World Music Awards =

16th award event

The 16th Annual World Music Awards was held on September 15, 2004 at the Thomas & Mack Center in Las Vegas, Nevada, USA, outside of Monaco for the first time. Awards were given based on worldwide sales figures for that year.

== Winners ==
=== 2004 Act ===
- World's Best Male Artist: Usher
- World's Best Female Artist: Norah Jones
- World's Best Group: Outkast

=== Pop ===
- World's Best Pop Male Artist: Usher
- World's Best Pop Female Artist: Norah Jones
- World's Best Pop Group: Outkast

=== Pop/Rock ===
- World's Best Pop/Rock Artist: Avril Lavigne

=== Rock ===
- World's Best Rock Artist: Evanescence

=== R&B ===
- World's Best R&B Male Artist: Usher
- World's Best R&B Female Artist: Alicia Keys

=== Rap/Hip-Hop ===
- World's Best Rap/Hip-Hop Artist: Outkast

=== New ===
- World's Best New Female Artist: Hilary Duff
- World's Best New Male Artist: Kanye West
- World's Best New Group: Maroon 5

== Chopard Diamond Award ==
The Diamond Award honored those incredibly successful recording-artists who had sold over 100 million albums during their career. This was the third year that this award was presented; the first was in 2001.

- Celine Dion

== Outstanding Contribution to the Music Industry Award ==
- Clive Davis

== Regional Awards ==
- World's Best-Selling Artist/Australia: Delta Goodrem
- World's Best-Selling Artist/Canada: Avril Lavigne
- World's Best-Selling Artist/United Kingdom: Dido
- World's Best-Selling Artist/Ireland: Westlife
- World's Best-Selling Artist/Greece: Haris Alexiou
- World's Best-Selling Artist/Netherlands: DJ Tiesto
- World's Best-Selling Artist/Ukraine: Ruslana
- World's Best-Selling Artist/Russia: Philip Kirkorov
- World's Best-Selling Artist/Germany: Sarah Connor
- World's Best-Selling Artist/Middle East: Latifa
- World's Best-Selling Artist/Scandinavia: The Rasmus
- World's Best-Selling Artist/Italy: Eros Ramazzotti
- World's Best-Selling Artist/Switzerland: DJ Bobo
- World's Best-Selling Artist/Spain: Alejandro Sanz
- World's Best-Selling Artist/France: Kyo
- World's Best-Selling Artist/China: Jay Chou
- World's Best-Selling Artist/Japan: Hikaru Utada
