= 2008 World Music Awards =

20th award event

The 20th annual World Music Awards was held on 9 November 2008 in Monaco. Awards were given based on worldwide sales figures for that year. The ceremony was hosted by actor Jesse Metcalfe and singer Michelle Williams.

== Performers ==
- Alicia Keys
- Anastacia
- Beyoncé
- Estelle
- Kate Ryan
- Kid Rock
- Laurent Wolf feat. Anggun
- Madcon
- Nancy Ajram
- Solange

== Nominees ==
Below is a list of all the nominees for each award, the winners are in bold.

=== World's Best-Selling Recording Act ===
- **Coldplay**

=== World's Best-Selling Pop Female Artist ===
- **Leona Lewis**

=== World's Best-Selling Pop Male Artist ===
- **Kid Rock**

=== World's Best-Selling Pop/Rock Female Artist ===
- Duffy
- Pink
- **Amy Winehouse**
- Katy Perry

=== World's Best-Selling Pop/Rock Male Artist ===
- **Kid Rock**
- Enrique Iglesias
- James Blunt
- Michael Jackson

=== World's Best-Selling Rock Act ===
- **Coldplay**
- Metallica
- Kings of Leon
- R.E.M.

=== World's Best-Selling R&B Artist ===
- **Alicia Keys**
- Leona Lewis
- Rihanna
- Mariah Carey

=== World's Best-Selling R&B Male ===
- **Chris Brown**
- Ne-Yo
- Usher
- Robin Thicke

=== World's Best-Selling New R&B Act ===
- **Estelle**

=== World's Best-Selling New Act ===
- Duffy
- **Leona Lewis**
- Estelle
- Katy Perry

=== World's Best-Selling Hip Hop/Rap Artist ===
- Eminem
- **Lil' Wayne**
- T.I.
- T-Pain

=== World's Best DJ ===
- **Laurent Wolf**
- Martin Solveig
- Tiësto
- Frankie Knuckles

=== World's Best-Selling Latin Performer ===
- **Enrique Iglesias**
- Gloria Estefan
- Shakira
- Luis Miguel

=== Biggest Internet Artist ===
- **Akon**

== Legend Awards ==
=== Diamond Award ===
- The Beatles/Ringo Starr

=== Outstanding Contribution to the Arts ===
- Beyoncé

=== Special Achievement Award ===
- Mariah Carey

=== Outstanding Contribution to the Music Industry ===
- L.A. Reid

=== Regional Awards ===
- World's Best-Selling African Artist: Akon
- World's Best-Selling American Artist: Madonna
- World's Best-Selling Australian Artist: Delta Goodrem
- World's Best-Selling Benelux Artist: Kate Ryan
- World's Best-Selling British Artist: Coldplay
- World's Best-Selling Canadian Artist: Céline Dion
- World's Best-Selling Chinese Artist: Jay Chou
- World's Best-Selling French Artist: Christophe Mae
- World's Best-Selling German Artist: Die Ärzte
- World's Best-Selling Irish Artist: The Script
- World's Best-Selling Italian Artist: Jovanotti
- World's Best-Selling Japanese Artist: Exile
- World's Best-Selling Middle Eastern Artist: Nancy Ajram
- World's Best-Selling Nigerian Artist: 2Face
- World's Best-Selling Norwegian Artist: Madcon
- World's Best-Selling Russian Artist: Philipp Kirkorov
- World's Best-Selling Spanish Artist: Enrique Iglesias
- World's Best-Selling Swedish Artist: Basshunter

== International telecasts ==
- United Kingdom: Channel 4
