= For You (Philipp Kirkorov album) =

Studio album by Philipp Kirkorov
- Released: 2007
- Recorded: 2004–2007
- Genre: Pop, power pop
- Producer: Philipp Kirkorov

Philipp Kirkorov chronology
Neznakomka (2003)	For You (2007)

For You is the fifteenth studio album by Russian pop-singer Philipp Kirkorov, released in 2007.

== Track listing ==
No.	Title	Length
1.	"Ya Etu Zizn` Tebye Otdam" (Я Эту Жизнь Тебе Отдам; I'll Give You This Life)	3:28
2.	"Poleteli!" (Полетели! Let Fly!)	3:54
3.	"Holodno V Gorode (duet with Alla Pugacheva)" (Холодно В Городе; Cold in the City)	3:25
4.	"Istoria" (История; History)	3:36
5.	"Strannik" (Странник; Roamer)	4:45
6.	"Poseluy" (Поцелуй; Kiss)	3:37
7.	"Zigalo" (Жигало)	3:37
8.	"On – Tvoya Iluzia" (Он – Твоя Илюзия: He is Your Illusion)	3:52
9.	"Lubov' Siyaet Yarko" (Любовь Сияет Ярко; Love Shining Bright)	3:18
10.	"Tvoi Glaza Kak More" (Твои Глаза Как Море; Your Eyes As Sea)	3:58
11.	"Serdce V 1000 Svechey" (Сердце В 1000 Свечей; Heart From 1000 Candles)	3:09
12.	"Kaif" (Кайф)	3:09
13.	"Obichnaya Istoria" (Обычная История; Normal History)	3:09
14.	"Yana" (Яна)	3:44
15.	"Stop!" (Стоп!)	3:19
16.	"Carnaval" (Карнавал)	2:59
17.	"Ya Veru V Lubov`" (Я Верю В Любовь; I Believe in Love)	3:09

== Singles ==
- "Ya Etu Zizn` Tebye Otdam"
- "Holodno V Gorode" (duet with Alla Pugacheva)
- "Obichnaya Istoria"
- "Serdce V 1000 Svechey"
