= Neznakomka =

Studio album by Philipp Kirkorov
- Released: 2003
- Recorded: 2003
- Genre: Pop, power pop
- Producer: Philipp Kirkorov

Philipp Kirkorov chronology
Vlubloniy I Bezumno Odinokiy (2002)	Neznakomka (2003)	For You (2007)

Neznakomka (Russian: Незнакомка, Unknown Girl) is the fourteenth studio album by Russian pop-singer Philipp Kirkorov, released in 2003 by Sony Russia.

== Track listing ==
No.	Title	Length
1.	"Roza Chainaya (duet with Masha Rasputina)" (Роза Чайная; Tea Rose)	3:28
2.	"Zestokaya Lubov`" (Жестокая Любовь; Cruel Love)	3:54
3.	"Mechta (duet with Masha Rasputina)" (Мечта; Dream)	3:25
4.	"Dai Ognya, Detka!" (Дай огня, детка!; Give me fire, baby!)	3:36
5.	"Nemnogo Zal`" (Немного Жаль; A Little Sorry)	4:45
6.	"Tebya Lublu Ya" (Тебя Люблю Я; I Love You)	3:37
7.	"Zaiki Vroz`" (Зайки Врозь!; Rabbits, Apart!)	3:37
8.	"Egoistka" (Эгоистка: Egoistic Girl)	3:52
9.	"Come&Dance"	3:18
10.	"Radio-Baby" (Радио-Бэйби)	3:58
11.	"Neznakomka" (Незнакомка; Unknown Girl)	3:09
12.	"Flaitist" (Флейтист; Flutist)	3:09
13.	"Pervaya Noch` Nashey Lubvi" (Первая Ночь Нашей Любви; The First Night Of Our Love)	3:09
14.	"Dusha I Pesnya" (Душа И Песня; Soul And Song)	3:44
15.	"Vse Otdam Ya Za Lubov`" (Всё Отдам Я За Любовь; I'll Give All For Love)	3:19
16.	"S Shikom-Bleskom" (С Шиком-Блеском; Elegant, Brilliantly)	2:59

== Songwriters ==
- Track 1 written by Vladimir Stepanov and Kai Metov. Track 2 written by Oleg Popkov. Track 3 written by Andrei Morsin and Ivan Peev. Track 4 written by Andrei Morsin, Leopoldo Mendez, Pablo Cepeda, Patrik Henzel, Rasmus Lindwall and Robert Watz. Track 5 written by Igor Nikolaev. Track 6 written by Andrei Morsin and Ron Malo. Track 7 written by Andrei Morsin, Ingrid Alberini and Marco Soncini. Track 8 written by Evgeny Muravyov and Arkady Ukupnik. Track 9 written by Mirit Shem-Ur and Svika Pick.

== Singles ==
- "Roza Chainaya" (duet with Masha Rasputina)
- "Zestokaya Lubov`"
- "Nemnogo Zal`"
- "Radio-baby"
