= Bedros Kirkorov =

Bulgarian singer and bandleader (1932–2025)

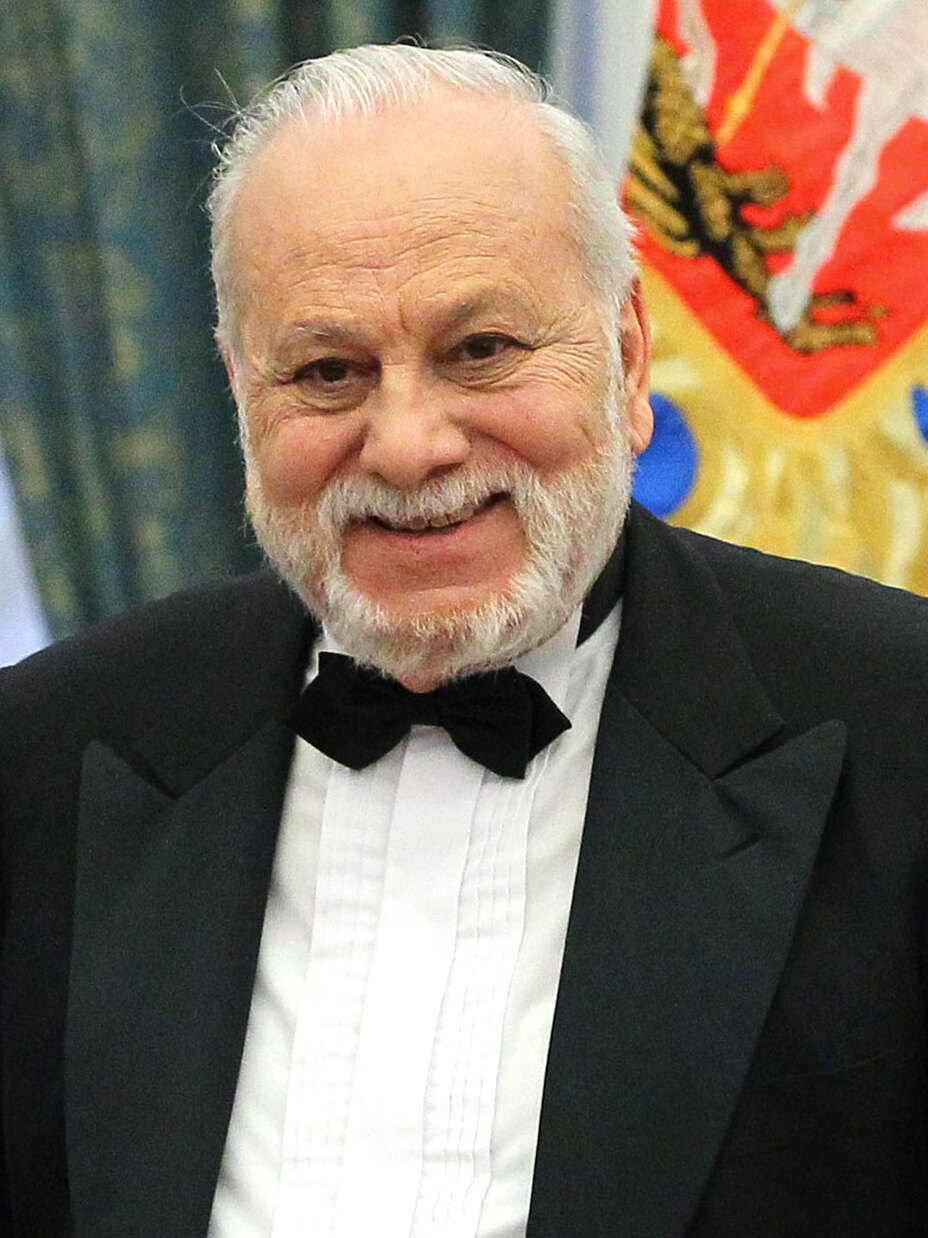
- Kirkorov in 2013
- Born: Bedros Filippovich Kirkorov; 2 June 1932; Varna, Kingdom of Bulgaria
- Died: 18 March 2025 (aged 92); Moscow, Russia
- Occupations: Singer; bandleader
- Children: Philipp Kirkorov
- Awards: People's Artist of Russia

Bedros Filippovich Kirkorov (Note: In this name that follows East Slavic naming customs, the patronymic is Filippovich and the family name is Kirkorov.) (Note: Russian: Бедрос Филиппович Киркоров, IPA: [bʲɪˈdros fʲɪˈlʲipəvʲɪtɕ kʲɪrˈkorəf]; Bulgarian: Бедрос Филипов Киркоров, romanized: Bedros Filipov Kirkorov, (Note: In this Bulgarian name, the patronymic is Pilibos or Filipov and the family name is Kirkorov.) IPA: [beˈdrɔs fiˈlipof kirˈkɔrof]; Western Armenian: Պետրոս Գիրգորով, romanized: Bedros Kirkorov, or Պետրոս Գրիգորյան, Bedros Krikoryan.) (2 June 1932 – 18 March 2025) was a Bulgarian and Russian singer and bandleader.

Born in Varna to an Armenian family, he was awarded the title People's Artist of Russia and was the father of Philipp Kirkorov, also a singer. Kirkorov died in Moscow at the age of 92.
