= Vyacheslav Malezhik =

Soviet-Russian singer (born 1947)

Vyacheslav Malezhik Вячеслав Ефимович Малежик
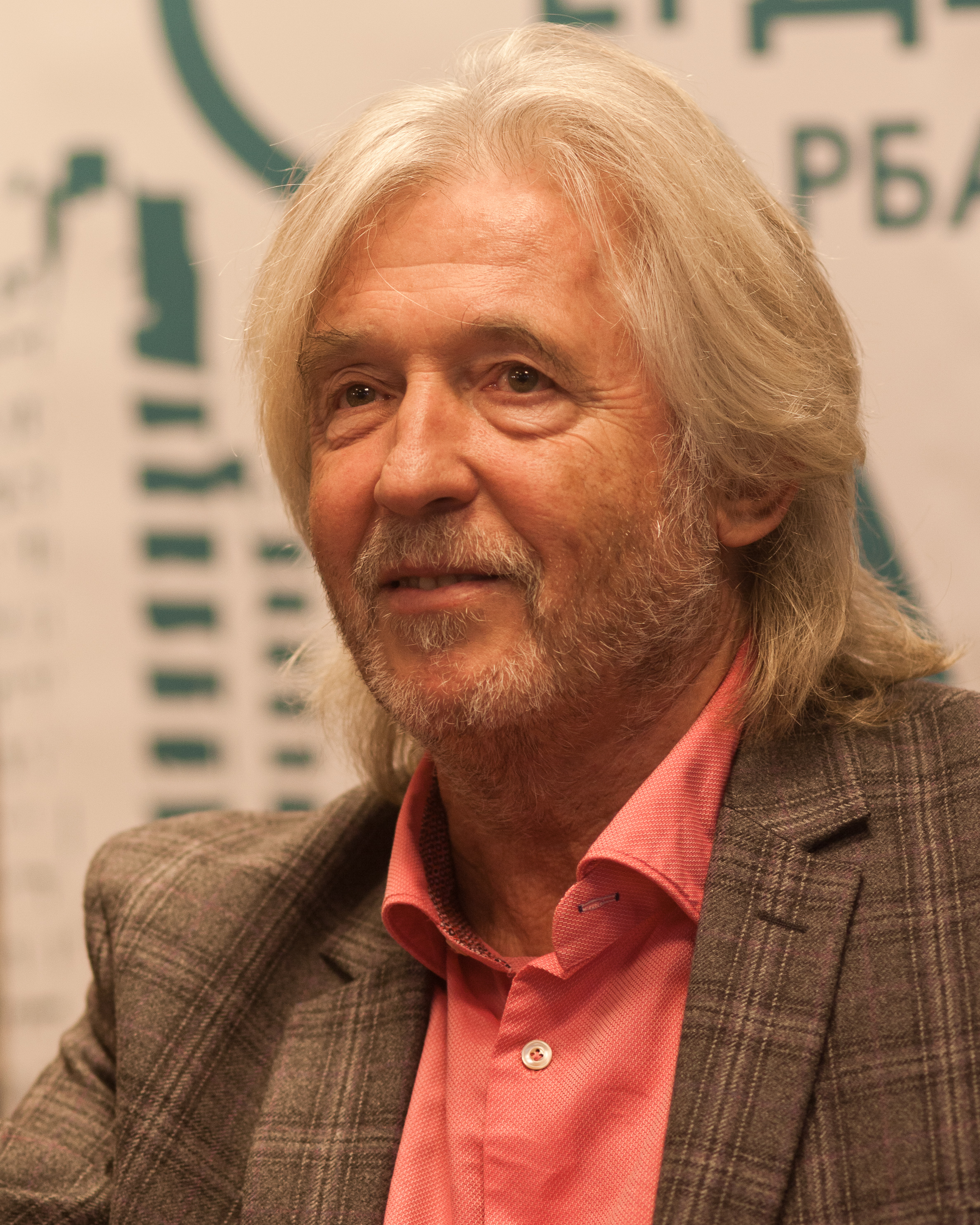

Background information
- Born: 17 February 1947 (age 79); Moscow, Russian SFSR
- Genres: Russian chanson, soviet music, bard, soft rock
- Occupations: Singer, poet, composer

Vyacheslav Yefimovich Malezhik (Russian: Вячесла́в Ефи́мович Малежик; born 17 February 1947 in Moscow, Russia) is a Soviet and Russian singer, poet and composer, Meritorious Artist of Russian Federation (2004). He participated in various musical groups, but became most famous as a solo artist.

== Biography ==
Vyacheslav Milezhik was born on 17 February 1947 in Moscow. Due to father's mistake when registering at the passport office, the surname became Malezhik.

His father, Yefim Ivanovich Milezhik, originally from Poltava, worked as a chauffeur. Her mother, Nina Ivanovna Milezhik, was a mathematics teacher, born in the Tula Oblast.

Vyacheslav graduated from the music school in the bayan class. In 1965 he entered MIIT.

== Family ==
Father – Efim Ivanovich Milezhik (born in Poltava), worked as a chauffeur. Mother – Nina Ivanovna Malezhik (born in Tula Oblast), was a mathematics teacher.

Vyacheslav is married to Tatiana Alekseevna Malezhik (born in Donetsk), she is formerly an actress. In 1977, the first son, Nikita, was born. In 1990, the second son, Ivan, was born.
