= Ibiza (Philipp Kirkorov and Nikolay Baskov song) =

Single by Philipp Kirkorov and Nikolay Baskov
- Released: July 25, 2018
- Genre: Pop
- Length: 3:09
- Label: Pervoe muzikalnoe izdatelstvo
- Songwriter: Anton Pustovoy

Philipp Kirkorov singles chronology
"Sotni vspyshek" (2018)	"Ibiza" (2018)	"Cvet nastroeniya chyorniy" (2018)

Nikolay Baskov singles chronology
"Dva venca na karete" (2018)	"Ibiza" (2018)	"S dnyom rozhdeniya!" (2018)

Music video
- "Ibiza" on YouTube

"Ibiza" is a song by the Russian singers Philipp Kirkorov and Nikolay Baskov. It premiered on July 25, 2018. The music video stirred divisive reactions.

== Background ==
This was the first time that Kirkorov and Baskov had recorded a duet in 20 years.

== Music video ==
On September 8, 2018, the StarPro YouTube channel released a video clip for the song. It starred such celebrities as Sergey Shnurov, Valery Leontiev, Andrey Malakhov, Garik Kharlamov, and Anita Tsoy.

== Reception ==
The song took first place in the Russian iTunes chart the day after its release.

Shortly before the release of the clip, Kirkorov showed the reaction of show business stars to his work. Dima Bilan noted the self-irony of Kirkorov and Baskov and said that now he "had seen everything." Netizens had a variety of reactions to the video clip. Writing for RIA Novosti, Dmitry Kiselyov called the music video "a disgusting abomination".

On September 19, 2018, the Чикен Карри YouTube channel released a video in which Kirkorov and Baskov sing an ironic apology for "Ibiza" and at the same time parody Kanye West and Lil Pump's "I Love It".

The song "Ibiza" took seventh place in the list of the top 10 most popular queries in 2018, compiled according to the data of the search service "Yandex".

== Charts ==
Chart (2018)	Peak Position
Russia (iTunes)	1
Russia (Russian Chart on Muz-TV)	1
Russia (Muz-TV Chart)	1
Russia (Top YouTube Russian Hits on Tophit)	3
Russia (Top Radio & YouTube Russian Hits on Tophit)	6
