= The Color of Mood is Blue =

Single by Philipp Kirkorov
- Released: March 14, 2018
- Genre: pop; deep house
- Length: 3:22
- Producer: Svetlana Loboda

"The Color of Mood is Blue" (Russian: "Цвет настроения синий") is a song by Russian singer Philipp Kirkorov, released on 14 March 2018 through the label "Первое музыкальное издательство" as a single. the song and music writer was Anton Pustovoy, and the music producer was Svetlana Loboda. The song came with a music video, which garnered more than 3 million views per day, leading daily trends on YouTube. By 7 May 2018, the video's amount of views on YouTube exceeded 19 million, and by 28 May, the video had more than 30 million views.

== Music video ==
On 27 April 2018, on the show "Evening Urgant" was the premiere of the music video. The producer was Ivan Urgant, the script writers were Aleksandr Gudkov, Grigory Shatokhin & Vadim Seleznyov, and the directors were Roman Kim, and Mikhail Semichev.

Following the music video's release, on the online petition platform Change.org was collecting signatures to deprive Kirkorov the title of People's Artist of Russia. The creator of the petition thought Kirkorov's actions on camera were unworthy of the title. The creator of the petition stated that the video promotes inappropriate behavior, alcohol use (including amongst minors), and using obscene language. On 4 May, Philipp Kirkorov, in response to the petition, said that his song topped the charts on Apple Music and iTunes in Russia.
