= Chopard Diamond Award =

- Awarded for: Selling over 100 million albums
- Country: Monaco
- Presented by: Albert II, The Prince of Monaco
- First award: 2 May 2001; 25 years ago
- Final award: 9 November 2008; 18 years ago
- Website: worldmusicawards.com

The Chopard Diamond Award, or the Diamond World Music Award, or simply the Diamond Award, was a special award of merit given by the World Music Awards to recording artists who had sold over 100 million albums throughout their career.

The Diamond Award was created in 2001, and it was not presented every year.

== Origins ==
The World Music Awards were established in 1989. Honors were based entirely on worldwide sales figures in the music industry based on the International Federation of the Phonographic Industry (IFPI).

In total, only six musical acts won the Chopard Diamond Award:

- 2001: Rod Stewart
- 2003: Mariah Carey
- 2004: Céline Dion
- 2005: Bon Jovi
- 2006: Michael Jackson
- 2008: Ringo Starr/The Beatles

== Ceremony ==
The first Diamond Award was issued in 2001 to British singer-songwriter Rod Stewart. He is known to have sold over 100 million records throughout his career.

American singer-songwriter Mariah Carey was honoured in 2003. Carey was the first female artist to receive the award, which was sponsored by Chopard in 2003, and had been previously recognized at the World Music Awards as the best-selling female artist of the Millennium. Mariah Carey sold more than 150 million records worldwide, which made her the highest-selling female recording artist in recorded music history.

Canadian songstress Céline Dion became the third overall and second female recipient of the Diamond Award. She was honoured in 2004, receiving the Diamond Award, recognizing her status as one of the World's Best-Selling Female Artists of all time. According to her record label, Sony Music Entertainment, Dion has sold over 140 million albums worldwide.

The American rock band Bon Jovi became the successors to Dion and the first group to be acknowledged with the Diamond Award, after being honoured in 2005. The band are believed to have sold over 120 million albums worldwide.

Michael Jackson, recognized by Guinness World Records as the most commercially successful entertainer of all time, became the fifth recipient of the award in 2006. With estimated sales as high as 65 million copies worldwide, his 1982 album Thriller remains the best-selling album of all time. Jackson is reported by his estate to have sold as much as 350 million units throughout the world.

The Beatles became the sixth act and second band to be honoured with the Diamond Award. Ringo Starr accepted their award in 2008. The English group are the biggest-selling band in musical history, with alleged sales of 1 billion units worldwide.

The last two editions of the World Music Awards, after that, in 2010 and 2014, did not give out Diamond Awards.

== Millennium Awards ==
Apart from the world's best-selling artists in the various categories and the national best-selling artists, special millennium awards were presented in 2000 to the world's best-selling recording artists of all time. The awards were presented to Michael Jackson and Mariah Carey in the male and female artist award categories.

== See also ==
- Chopard
- List of best-selling music artists
