= Anthem of Kamchatka Oblast =

2004–07 anthem of a former Russian federal subject in the Far East

Gimn Kamchatskaya oblast'
English: Anthem of Kamchatka Krai
- Гимн Камчатской области
- Coat of arms of Kamchatka Oblast
- Regional anthem of Kamchatka Oblast
- Lyrics: Boris Dubrovin
- Music: Evgeniy Morozov
- Adopted: 29 December 2004
- Relinquished: 1 July 2007

Audio sample
- Official orchestral vocal recording: file; help

Digital instrumental version

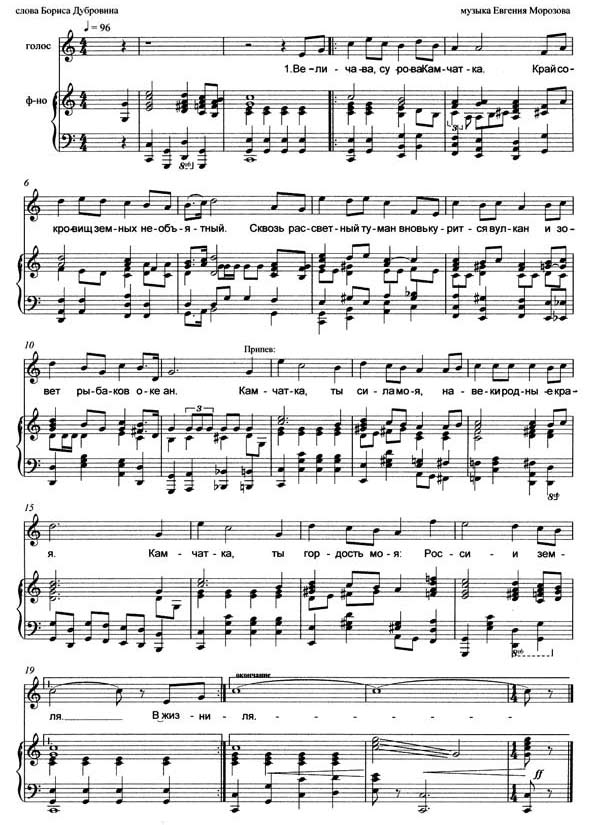
Piano and vocal sheet music

The anthem of Kamchatka Oblast (Russian: Гимн Камчатской области, Gimn Kamchatskoy oblasti) was the anthem of the former Kamchatka Oblast in Far Eastern Russia, which existed until 1 July 2007. It was adopted in Law of Kamchatka Oblast No. 245 of 29 December 2004, "On the anthem of Kamchatka Oblast". The lyrics were written by Boris Dubrovin, and the music was composed by Evgeniy Morozov.

== History ==
Work on the anthem began in 2001, when the Heraldic Commission was formed. The Heraldic Commission suggested Russian poet Boris Dubrovin write the lyrics of the anthem, while the music was composed by composer and head of the Kamchatka Choir Capella Evgeniy Morozov. The anthem was finally signed into law on 29 December 2004 by governor Mikhail Mashkovtsev, nearly eight months after the adoption of the flag and coat of arms on 5 May 2004.

In November 2007, Morozov expressed his intention to submit the same anthem to an upcoming competition for the anthem for the new Kamchatka Krai, which had been formed from the unification of Kamchatka Oblast and Koryak Autonomous Okrug on 1 July 2007, although he stated that the potential for some changes to the lyrics had been discussed, which were eventually implemented in the proposed anthem.

== Lyrics ==
Russian original

I
Величава, сурова Камчатка —
Край сокровищ земных необъятный.
Сквозь рассветный туман
Вновь курится вулкан,
И зовёт рыбаков океан.

Припев:
Камчатка — ты сила моя,
Навеки родные края.
Камчатка — ты гордость моя,
России земля.

II
В жизни стоит любого богатства
Наше дружное, крепкое братство.
Мы надеждой живём,
Ты, Камчатка, — наш дом,
Как святыню тебя бережём.

Припев

III
День России берет здесь начало,
На Камчатке у наших причалов.
Нет надёжней щита,
Чем границы черта —
Здесь России форпост навсегда.

Припев

English translation

I
The majestic, harsh Kamchatka,
Immense land of earthly treasures.
Through the dawn fog
The volcano smokes again
And the ocean calls the fishermen.

Chorus:
Kamchatka - you are my strength,
forever native land.
Kamchatka - you are my pride,
land of Russia.

II
Any wealth is worth it in life.
Our friendly, strong brotherhood.
We live in hope,
You, Kamchatka, are our home,
We take care of you like a shrine.

Chorus

III
Russia Day starts here,
In Kamchatka, at our berths.
There is no more reliable shield,
Than the line of the border,
Here, Russia is an outpost - forever.

Chorus

== See also ==
- Anthem of Kamchatka Krai
