= Vladimir Kuzmin =

Russian musician (born 1955)

Vladimir Borisovich Kuzmin Влади́мир Борисович Кузьмин
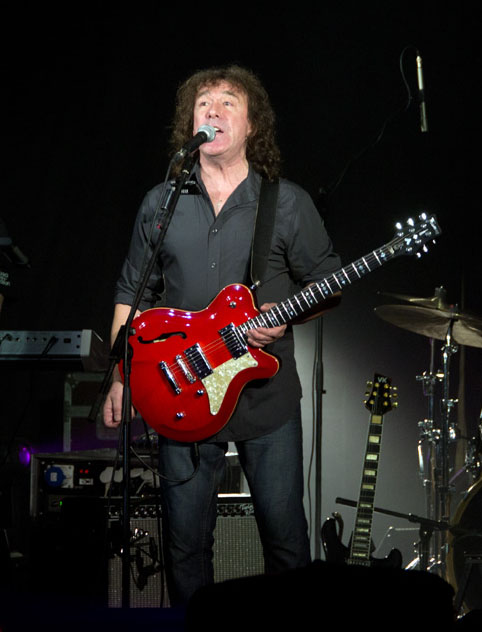
- Born: Vladimir Borisovitsch Kuzmin; 31 May 1955 (age 71); Moscow, Soviet Union
- Title: People's Artist of Russia (2011)
- Website: http://vladimirkuzmin.org/

Vladimir Borisovich Kuzmin (Russian: Влади́мир Борисович Кузьмин; born 31 May 1955) is a Russian rock singer, guitarist, and songwriter.

== Biography ==
Kuzmin is the son of Boris Kuzmin, a naval officer, and Natalya Kuzmina, a Russian language and literature teacher. When he was young boy, Kuzmin played violin in musical school. He wrote his first song when he was six years old. He learned to play guitar on his own. He organized his first band, Aelita, in the 6th grade. Two years later, on school evenings, he performed songs of The Beatles, The Rolling Stones, Creedence Clearwater Revival, Jimi Hendrix and Led Zeppelin along with his own material.

== Career ==
Then Kuzmin earned a degree in a musical college, became a lead guitarist of professional VIA bands Nadejda (1977 - 1978) and Samotsvety (1978 - 1979). Producer of Samotsvety Yuri Malikov remembered that Kuzmin arranged some songs. But, in 1979, together with vocalist and guitarist of Vesiolie Rebiata Alexander Barykin, Kuzmin organized rock band Carnaval.

In 1981 Carnaval have released an EP on main Soviet firm of musical records Melodiya and debut album The Superman. In Carnaval, Kuzmin has proved himself as a rock guitarist and also as a composer, arranger, and vocalist.

Carnaval - Ice Shed Tears (music and lyrics by Vladimir Kuzmin) on YouTube

He played on keyboards, violin and flute too.

In 1982 Kuzmin organized new band called Dinamik. He remained a friend of Alexander Barykin.

Vladimir Kuzmin and Alexander Barykin - The Ball (music and lyrics by Vladimir Kuzmin) on YouTube

Kuzmin toured USA under the direction of American promoter Scott Pedersen / JazzConcerts.com in 1989 with Dinamik. American singer-songwriter Michael Bolton said: «Vladimir Kuzmin is a super-talented musician, I’ve ever known in my life. By the way, we've hanged out down in Moscow in 1988 and I wrote a beautiful song together. Actually, I send a letter to him, but I had no answer. He’s my Russian brother. Let him know.»

== Discography ==
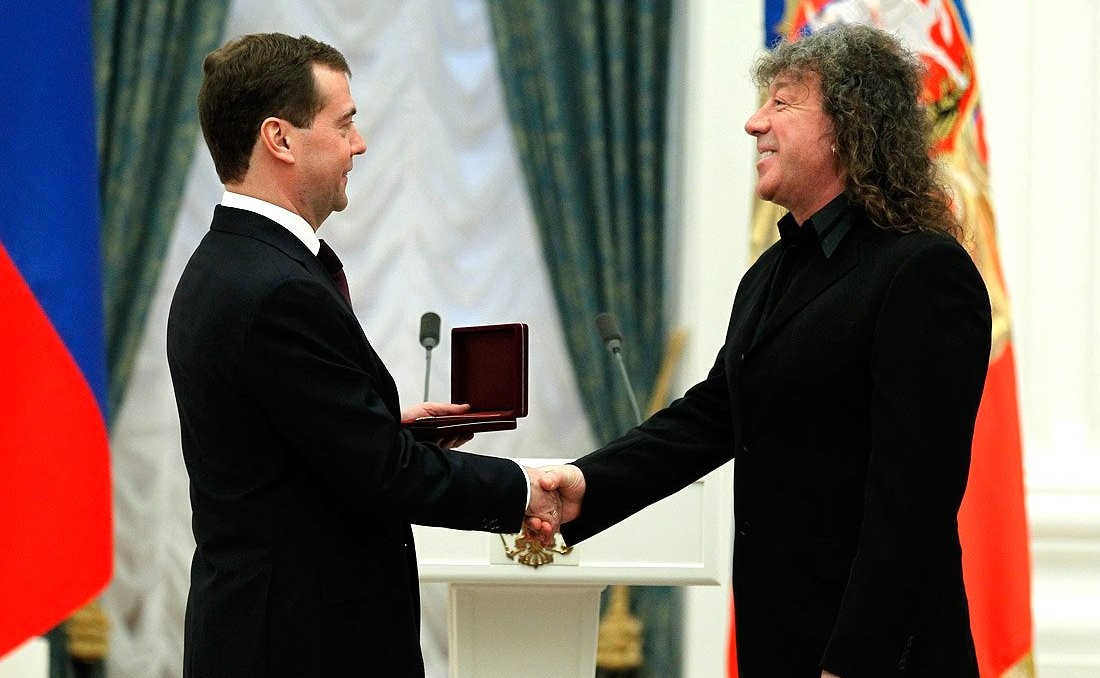
2011

With band Carnaval:

| Russian title | English translation | Year |
|---|---|---|
| Рок-группа «Карнавал». | Carnaval rock band. | 1981(EP, Melodiya) |

1. Sudden Impasse (music by Vladimir Kuzmin, lyrics by Igor Kokhanovsky)
2. Empty Word (music by Vladimir Kuzmin and Vladimir Matetsky, lyrics by Igor Kokhanovsky) on YouTube
3. Now I Know (music by Alexander Barykin and Vladimir Kuzmin, lyrics by Igor Kokhanovsky)

Personnel
Vladimir Kuzmin (ex-Nadejda, ex-Samotsvety), lead vocals (2), lead guitar, keyboards, violin, flute, vocoder (2), backing vocals (1, 3)
Alexander Barykin, lead vocals (1, 3), rhythm guitar, acoustic guitar, backing vocals (2)
Evgeny Kazantsev (ex-Vesiolie Rebiata, ex-Samotsvety), bass, backing vocals
Vladimir Boldyrev (ex-Modo), drums

- 1981 — Супермен (Superman)

With the band "Dynamic":

- 1982 — Том 1 (Volume One)
- 1982 — Том 2 (Volume Two)
- 1983 — Возьми с собой (Take Me With You)
- 1984 — Чудо-сновидения (Magic Of Dream)
- 1985 — Голос (Voice, the single)
- 1986 — Моя любовь (My Love)
- 1986 — Пока не пришёл понедельник (Til' Monday Comes)
- 1987 — Ромео и Джульетта (Romeo and Juliet)
- 1988 — Смотри на меня сегодня (Take a Look At Me Today)
- 1989 — Слёзы в огне (Tears On Fire)
- 1991 — Dirty Sounds (Грязный Саунд)
- 1992 — Crazy About Rock’n’Roll (Помешан На Рокнроле)
- 1992 — Моя подруга Удача (My Friend - Luck)
- 1994 — Небесное притяжение (Heavenly Gravity)
- 1996 — Семь морей (Seven Seas)
- 1997 — Две звезды (Two Stars)
- 1997 — Грешный ангел (Sinful Angel)
- 1999 — Наши лучшие дни (Our Best Days)
- 2000 — Сети (Networks)
- 2001 — Рокер (Rocker)
- 2002 — Рокер 2 (Rocker 2)
- 2003 — О чём-то лучшем (About Something Better)
- 2006 — Святой ручей (Saint Creek)
- 2007 — Тайна (Secret)

== Personal life ==
From 1977 to 1985 he was married to Tatyana Artemyeva (poet). They had three children: Elizaveta (1977–2002), Stepan (1983–2009) and Sophia (born 1985).

In 1980s he was in a relationship with Alla Pugacheva.

In 1986 his daughter Marta was born to Irina Miltseva, and in 1987 his daughter Nicole was born to Tatiana Muingo.

In 1990 Kuzmin married American model Kelly Curzon, they lived together for about a year.

From 1993 to 2000 he dated actress Vera Sotnikova.

In 2001-2018 he was married Ekaterina Trofimova. But in 2019 Kuzmin and Trofimova reunited, and in 2020 they officially married again.
