= Belikova =

Belikova may refer to:

- Feminine form of the Russian surname Belikov
- Bělíková, feminine form of the Czech surname Bělík
