= Druzhit' Nam Nado =

Дружить нам надо

Studio album by Vesyolye Rebyata
- Released: 1978
- Genres: Soviet estrada; Beat music; Country rock; Psychedelic pop
- Label: Melodiya

Vesyolye Rebyata chronology
Lubov' Ogromnaya Strana (1974)	Дружить нам надо (1978)

Druzhit' Nam Nado (We should be friends) is second studio album by Soviet VIA Vesyolye Rebyata.

== Style ==
This album is considered one of the most creative works of a Vesyolye Rebyata. He seems to be continuing the tradition of the previous album, made in the genre of beat music with elements of art-rock, however, is something different from it. First of all, notably the impact of country music, especially in the tracks "Напиши мне письмо" and "Встреча", the second track of the album, "Наш дом" can be called an acoustic folk. The album also contains classic VIA-songs such as "Мамина пластинка" and the hard rock/blues rock (track "Дальняя песня").

== Track listing ==
1. Напиши мне письмо
2. Наш дом
3. Летние каникулы
4. В синем омуте
5. Встреча
6. Песенка для всех
7. Мамина пластинка
8. Дальняя песня
9. Проходят годы
10. Дружить нам надо
