= Anthem of Kamchatka Krai =

Anthem of a Russian federal subject in the Far East

Gimn Kamchatskogo Kraya
English: Anthem of Kamchatka Krai
- Гимн Камчатского края
- Coat of arms of Kamchatka Krai
- Regional anthem of Kamchatka Krai
- Lyrics: Boris Dubrovin
- Music: Evgeniy Morozov
- Adopted: 1 July 2010

Audio sample
- Official piano and vocal recording: file; help

Official recordings by the Kamchatka Choir Capella and the Globalis Symphony Orchestra, conducted by Boris Dubrovin, in November 2010
Orchestral vocal version

Orchestral instrumental version

Orchestral instrumental version (one verse)

Orchestral instrumental version (one verse) (version 2)

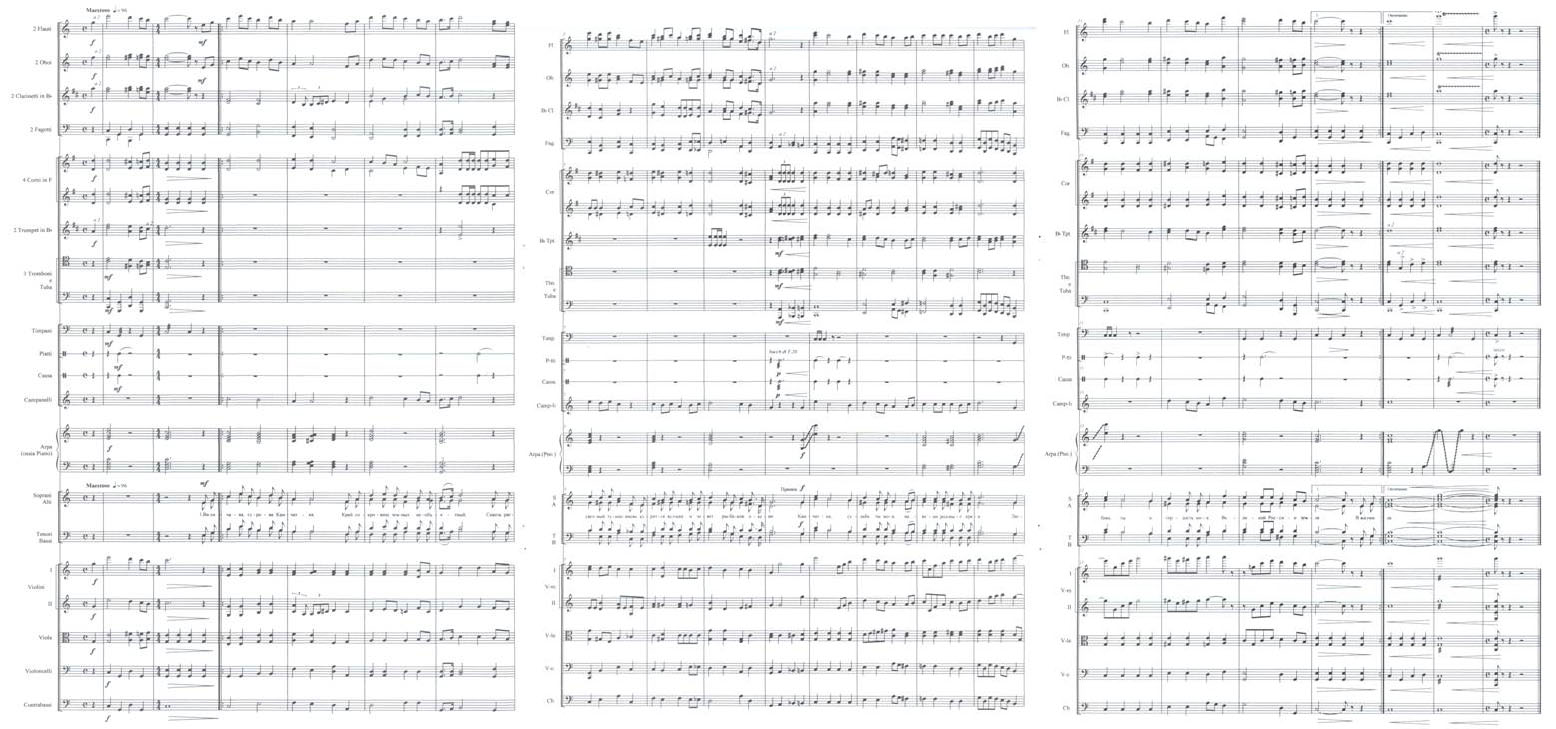
Orchestra and choir sheet music

The anthem of Kamchatka Krai (Russian: Гимн Камчатского края, Gimn Kamchatskogo Kraya), a krai in far eastern Russia, was adopted in Law of Kamchatka Krai No. 397 of 5 March 2010, "On the Anthem of Kamchatka Krai". The lyrics were written by Boris Dubrovin, and the music was composed by Evgeniy Morozov. The law introducing the anthem came into force on 1 July 2010, the anniversary of the Krai's creation on 1 July 2007.

== History ==
Kamchatka Krai was formed on 1 July 2007 from the unification of Kamchatka Oblast and Koryak Autonomous Okrug. On 18 August 2008, a competition was announced by the Heraldic Commission to create symbols for the new krai, to "most vividly reflect the historical development of the region, its spiritual, political, economic, cultural and national heritage."

The competition ran from 25 August to 28 November 2008, and the three best anthems were to be awarded 70,000-, 40,000- and 20,000-ruble cash prizes, respectively. The competition was also open to those from other regions of Russia. In November 2007, composer and head of the Kamchatka Choir Capella Evgeniy Morozov, who had composed the anthem for the former Kamchatka Oblast, had expressed his intention to submit the same anthem to the upcoming competition, saying that it corresponded to the objective in "both music and text". However, he had also stated that the potential for some changes to the lyrics had been discussed, which were eventually implemented in the proposed anthem.

Morozov's anthem was chosen, and on 17 February 2010, a law on the anthem of Kamchatka Krai was adopted at a session of the Legislative Assembly. The law came into force on 1 July 2010, the anniversary of the Krai's creation on 1 July 2007, and anniversary celebrations were accompanied by the first performances of the new anthem, including by the combined choir directed by Morozov.

On 23 November 2010, a selection of official recordings of the anthem were made available on the official website of the Kamchatka Krai government. These were recorded in early November 2010 by the full ensemble of the Kamchatka Choir Capella and the Moscow Globalis Symphony Orchestra, conducted by Pavel Borisovich Ovsyannikov.

The anthem has been performed at several official events since then, such as sporting events, folklore festivals, Flag Day and the anniversary of the formation of Kamchatka Krai.

== Lyrics ==
Russian original

I
Величава, сурова Камчатка,
Край сокровищ земных необъятный.
Сквозь рассветный туман
Вновь курится вулкан
И зовёт рыбаков океан.

Припев:
Камчатка — судьба ты моя,
Навеки родные края.
Любовь ты и гордость моя,
Великой России земля.

II
В жизни стоит любого богатства
Наше дружное, крепкое братство.
Мы надеждой живём,
Ты, Камчатка, — наш дом,
Как святыню тебя бережём.

Припев

III
День России берёт здесь начало,
На Камчатке, у наших причалов.
Нет надёжней щита,
Чем границы черта,
Здесь России форпост — навсегда.

Припев

English translation

I
The majestic, harsh Kamchatka,
Immense land of earthly treasures.
Through the dawn fog
The volcano smokes again
And the ocean calls the fishermen.

Chorus:
Kamchatka - you are my destiny,
forever native land.
You are my love and my pride,
land of great Russia.

II
Our friendly, strong brotherhood
Is worth any wealth in life.
We live in hope,
You, Kamchatka, are our home,
We take care of you like a shrine.

Chorus

III
Russia's day starts here,
In Kamchatka, at our berths.
There is no more reliable shield,
Than the line of the border,
Here is a Russian outpost - forever.

Chorus

== See also ==
- Anthem of Kamchatka Oblast
