= Yegor Irodov =

Ukrainian musician and actor (born 1966)

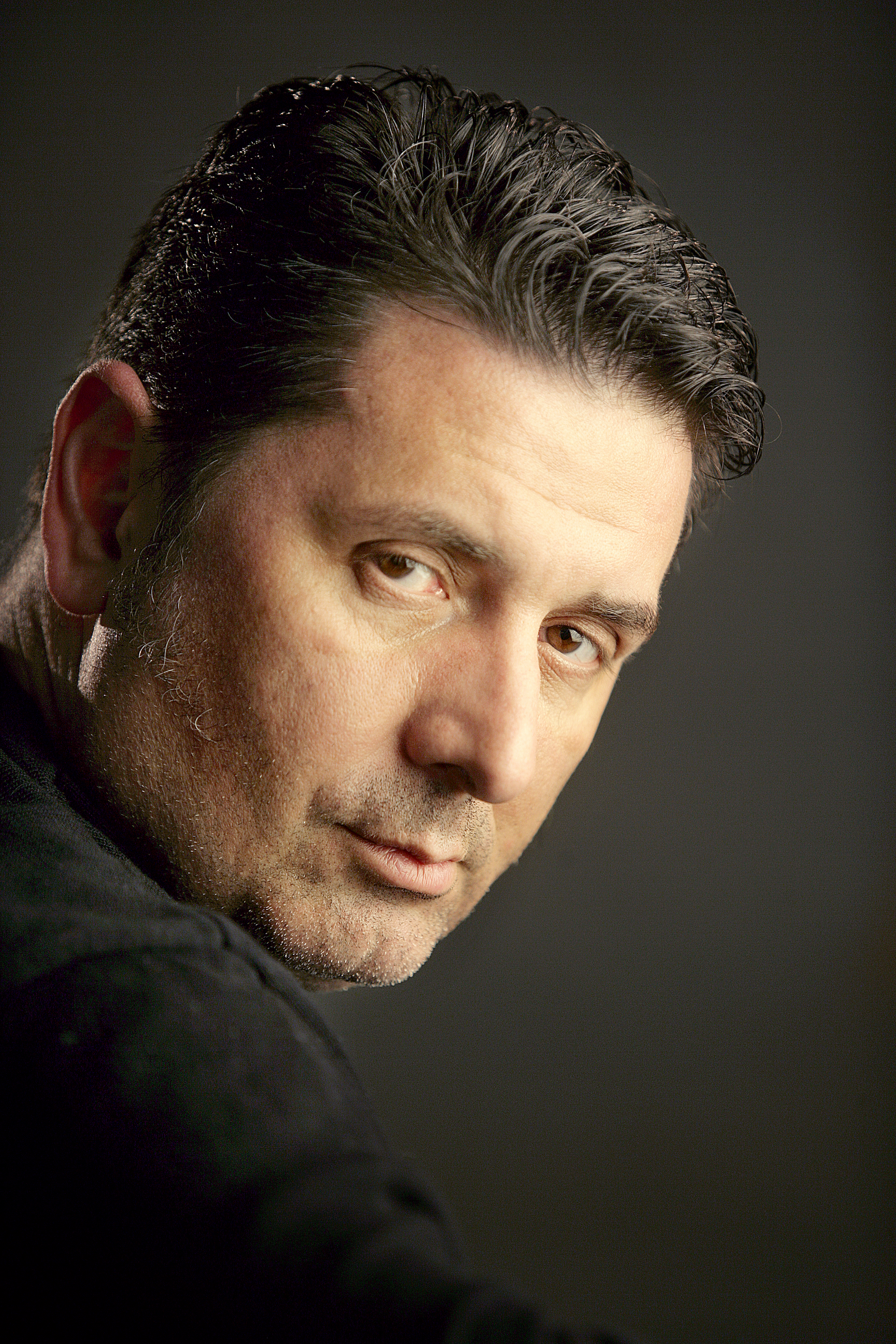
- Born: Yegor Irodov; June 30, 1966 (age 60); Kiev, Ukraine
- Occupations: Musician, sound supervisor, music producer, composer, actor, arranger

Yegor Irodov (Russian: Егор Иродов; born June 30, 1966) is a Ukrainian and Soviet musician, audio engineer, arranger, producer, composer, and actor.

== Biography ==
Yegor Irodov was born on June 30, 1966, in Kyiv, to physiologist parents Mikhail Irodov and Ninelle Irodova, both of whom were contributors to the development of Ukrainian sport—athletes trained by them provided Ukraine with a large quantity of Olympic medals.

At the age of 6, Yegor began playing the piano. In 1980, he was awarded a gold medal when graduating from a musical school, and that same year enrolled in the K. Stetsenko Musical School of Jazz, attending with Konstantin Vilensky.

In 1981, Yegor began performing on stage in the Union of Ukrainian Composers and other concert halls across the country as one half of a jazz duet with Alexey Kolesnichenko, and various other jazz outfits.

In 1984, he graduated from the K. Stetsenko Musical School of Jazz with a Gold medal.

During his service in the army, Yegor participated in the military's orchestral division, where he learned musical orchestration and arrangement.

From 1987, he began working with the Krasnodar State Philarmony as the musical director of the group Tandem, and of the parodist Vladimir Chistyakov. During that time, he also worked with Igor Matvienko, Sergei Mazayev, Nikolai Rastorguyev (as part of the collective Zdrastvuyi Pesnya, the Kuban Cossack Choir, and Grigoriy Ponomarenko.

In 1989, Yegor left Tandem to join a group named Zodchiye as their keyboardist and musical director, relocating to Moscow – Zodchiye went on to tour the USSR and abroad. Irodov was responsible for all of the arrangements during his tenure with the band, in addition to their musical style. At that time, the group's political lyrics landed them on the Black List of the USSR's Komsomol and the party's "recommendations". Zodchiye claimed then to be taking part in an attempt to "nail in the final nails on the coffin of European communism."

The group's success was propelled via Mikhail Gorbachev's perestroika policy, which allowed the TV show Vzglyad to fund the band's music videos, gaining the support of the new political vanguard. This step had gotten the group booked in virtually every concert hall in the former Soviet Union, with the likes of Aleksey Glyzin, Yevgeny Margulis, the group Lyube, Rondo, participating in the Alla Pugachyeva Theater of Song, etc.

Over time, as Zodchiye's lyrics became less politically charged, popular interest in the band waned.

Parallel to his work in Zodchiye, Yegor worked as an arranger with artists and bands such as Tamara Gverdtsiteli, Alyona Sviridova, Olga Kormukhina, Igor Gataullin, Alexander Barykin, Alexander Shevchenko, Andrey Marioli, the groups Super R, Vesyolye Rebyata, Eskadron, etc.

In 1991, collaborating with the composer Viktor Reznikov, the singer Mikhail Muromov, and the leader of Zodchiye Yury Davidov, Yegor took part in founding the "Starko" Russian Pop Star Football Club as its chief administrator. The charitable aims of this project inspired many of its members to donate to sick children all over the country. Yegor left the organization in 1996, citing dissatisfaction with its impediment to his creativity, and relocated back to Kyiv, where he began working as a songwriter and arranger with local acts and artists as Nikolai Mosgovoi, Aurika Rotaru, Irina Skazina, Oksana Khozhai, the guitarist Sergo Chanturia, Tina Karol, Anyuta Slavska, Natalie Volkova, the groups: Man Sound, KARE, 12th Floor, the Roma theatre Romance, and many others. In addition, he began working with television projects and commercials, with over 700 compositions recorded.

In 2002, Yegor began to study film audio production under Lyubov Tselmer, going on to become the first dual sound producer-film composer in Ukraine. As a result, his first film, European Convoy (directed by Andrey Benkendorf), received critical acclaim.

In 2004, Yegor took part in ABBA's 30th Anniversary, in Vilnius, Lithuania, working as the musical director and sound producer of the event, thereby halting his music-making career and dedicating his time to audio post-production for film and television.

Since 2006, he has been working as the head of the audio department in the largest film corporation in the CIS, Star Media Group. As of now, Yegor has been the sound producer behind over 50 films and television series which have been shown and broadcast in many countries throughout Eastern and Western Europe, the Middle East, China, Japan, the United States, Israel, and others. Many of his productions went on to win awards as well as first place in various international contests.

After the Russian invasion of Ukraine (24th Feb 2022), he is the USA Goodwill Ambassador for the Media Council at Ukrainian World Congress.

Currently, he is enrolled in the Berklee College of Music.

== Personal life ==
Yegor is married to Oleksandra Savelyeva, and they have a daughter Maryna (b. 2009).

== Awards and recognition ==
- LEO Awards 2026 Winner as a Best Sound Feature Length Documentary, 2x LEO Nominations
- Juror of International Emmy Award (New York City)
- Juror of Banff World Media Festival
- International Membership Friend of the Academy of Canadian Cinema & Television .
- Member of the International Academy of Television Arts & Sciences (Emmy Award) .
- Goodwill Ambassador on the Music Field of View of The World Film and Music Festival .
- National Delegate for East Europe of the International Forum-Festival COOKING MEDIAS SHOW .
- FILMING IN UKRAINE. TV. Best of 10 Years Awards (2020) Best Sound Supervisor .
- USA Goodwill Ambassador for the Media Council of the Ukrainian World Congress .

== Sources ==
- «The less noticeable is the work of the audio engineer, the higher is his professionalism.». Star Media Sound Producer about film, show business and Eurovision // Interview for "Medianyanya»
- "Group «Zodchiye» Megabook
- Official site of the group «Zodchiye
- Newspaper «Segodnya» «ПЕРВЫЙ ЧЕТВЕРТАК ПЕРВОГО ЭСТРАДНОГО»
- Official site of Ilya Shakunov
- Secrets of Sound Design for Film // Interview for BROADCAST MAGAZINE
- LAST FM
- ROCK.hell
- // top 100 Ukrainian Film Makers for last 10 years
