= Boris Dubrovin =

Boris Dubrovin may refer to:

- Boris Dubrovin (mathematician)
- Boris Dubrovin (poet)
