= VIA Plamya =

VIA Plamya ВИА Пламя
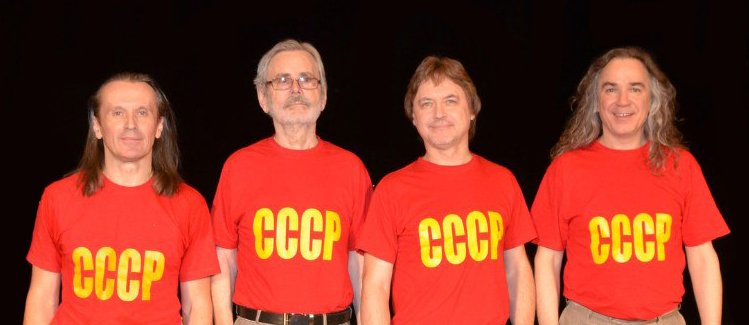

Background information
- Origin: USSR; Russia
- Genres: Pop rock Pop music
- Years active: 1975–present
- Members: Sergey Berezin; Valery Belov; Oleg Pronichev; Vitaly Puchkar

VIA Plamya (Russian: Пламя, Flame) is a Soviet and Russian pop group.

== Biography ==
Group was organized in Moscow in October 1975, when the members of the popular in the early 70s VIA Samotsvety parted with their leader Yuriy Malikov. The artistic director of the new group, which became known as Plamya, became an accomplished musician Nikolai Mikhailov.

As composition of the music band also includes Valentin Diaconov and Yuri Peterson (guitar and vocals), Alexey Shachnev (bass), Sergey Berezin (keyboards) and Alexander Mogilevsky and Gennady Zharkov (pipes), Irina Shachneva (vocals) and Yuriy Genbachev (drums). Most members of the ensemble had an average music education.

In total, during the time of his success on the Soviet stage VIA has released 16 LPs, Giants 5 and 11 minions. In the early 2000s, the group re-recorded his repertoire on CD.
