= Lubov' Ogromnaya Strana =

Любовь — Огромная Страна

Studio album by Vesyolye Rebyata
- Released: Summer 1974
- Recorded: Spring 1973 – Spring 1974 (original longplay); 1971–1976 (2009 re-issue)
- Studio: Melodiya; 3rd and 5th studio State House of Radiobroadcast and Sound Recording, Moscow
- Genre: Pop rock, hard rock, art rock, beat, traditional pop, sunshine pop, psychedelic pop
- Length: 40:56 (original longplay); 69:17 (CD with bonuses)
- Label: Melodiya С60-05459-60
- Producer: Pavel Slobodkin, Alexei Puzyriov, Gennadiy Makeev

Vesyolye Rebyata chronology
Kak Prekrasen Etot Mir (1972)	Любовь — Огромная Страна (1974)	Pesni Davida Tukhmanova (1975)

Lubov' Ogromnaya Strana (Love is a Huge Country) is the first long-play studio album by Soviet VIA band Vesyolye Rebyata, recorded on the Soviet monopolist label Melodiya and released in summer 1974. In 2009, the album was re-issued on CD featuring completely remastered tracks with an alternate track-listing and multiple bonus material. The album is considered to be a Soviet rock classics and the best LP of the band.

In 2014, the album was listed among ""Melodiya" 50 cult LPs" by Silver Rain Radio

== Album style ==
=== Studio songs ===
The album featured a blend of Soviet music based on traditional pop as well as a strong influence of various Western rock music. VR, who were always known for a hard-edged approach, initially grounded on The Beatles in the early 70s, diversified their sound with complex art rock arrangements, mainly carried out by Alexei Puzyriov and Pavel Slobodkin. The album starts with an upbeat eponymous song with Alexander Lerman]|Lerman on vocals. The soft ballad Я к тебе не подойду, albeit strongly dispersing with a solid sound of the band, appeared to be one of their most popular songs ever recorded and was repeatedly covered by various artists ever since. Отчего, an upbeat tempo hard rock song with Valeriy Habazin on guitar playing small powerful chord riffs, was often played on live performances, including the Gold Ortheus grand-prix in Bulgaria in 1976. Вечная весна is an art-rock song performed by Alexander Barykin. Что такого, composed by Slobodkin, features an Elvis Presley-inspired riff played by Puzyryov with the help of a guitar compressor and ironic lyrics delivered by Lerman. The song generally has got an upbeat, hard rock tempo with a powerful rhythm guitar and a trumpet solo done by Chinenkov. Это Москва was recorded by the plea of Tukhmanov in November 1973, the band had to rehearse in a train as there was only one day to record it. During live performances, it was sung by Barykin. As denoted by the band members, this song is not necessarily about Moscow, but a one's beloved hometown.

Наша песня is a hard rock track arranged by the guitarist Alexei Puzyryov. It features a Grand Funk Railroad-inspired introduction with a powerful bass guitar riff delivered by Evgeny Kazantsev accompanied by a set of fuzzed guitar riffs played by Puzyryov, who played both rhythm and lead guitars on this track. It is notable that the music pattern of the song, arranged in hard rock, was fully written by Puzyryov. Most tracks of the song were recorded in April 1973. Качели is a psychedelic rock track featuring complex vocal harmonies with Alyoshin on lead vocals. It was arranged by Alexei Puzyryov and his brother Gennadiy. The piano solo in the middle of the song was performed by the bandleader Slobodkin. Качели was by far the latest done track in the album, as it was finally mixed in April 1974. The lyrics of this song were initially a translation of Robert Burns' rhymes, but Slobodkin willed to engage Derbenyov to create new lyrics. The song was originally designated as Дженни. А мне-то зачем is an upbeat traditional pop/rock song, displaying an earlier approach of the band, based on beat music. Its phonogram was initially recorded way back in summer 1972 with the vocal track by Alexander Barykin. Скорый поезд is a stringed hard rock track written by David Tukhmanov and one of the best known songs by the band. It was recorded on the 5th studio of SHRR in winter 1974. Arranged by the guitarist Alexei Puzyryov, it kicks out with a short, train movement-resembling overdriven guitar riff on B5 chord. After the second verse, the band plunges into heavy rock with a complex arrangement, featuring short keyboard solos by Buynov, forced vocals verses by Lerman and an exotic guitar solo played by Igor Degtiaryk. Albeit a definite heavy approach of Скорый поезд, it got a large airplay within radio broadcast and didn't challenge difficulties within controller councils of Melodiya. Всегда вдали, the concluding track, is an ode to Deep Purple's "Hard Lovin' Man" (VR repeatedly praised Deep Purple in their songs as "Любовь – дитя планеты" "Вечный огонь", "Пойду ль я, выйду ль я" and occasionally played Deep Purple covers at concerts) featuring heavy distorted guitar riffs by Puzyryov and solos by Degtiariuk and Buynov and vocals by Lerman, accompanied by Alyoshin and Puzyryov within choruses.

=== Live performances ===
Several songs from the album were played live. The eponymous song was often played live and within medleys, too. Отчего was featured on Golden Orpheus live album. Это Москва was often played in 1974 on concerts, where the orchestral arrangement was remade by Gennadiy Makeev. Наша песня had little live airplay in 1974. Скорый поезд was often played in 1974–1976 occasionally with Malezhyk on lead vocals owing to a temporary absence of Lerman. In a live version, the opening riff was repeated more, than twice.

Качели, though beloved by Alexei Puzyryov, was never played live.

== Track listing ==
The original vinyl record contained 11 songs, 6 on the first side, and 5 on the second. Four songs were composed by David Tukhmanov. The song "А мне-то Зачем", composed by the bandleader Pavel Slobodkin and was originally drafted as "Я парень простой" in 1972, but it was reversed owing to "offensive" lyrics. The initial version of this song was included on the next "compilation" longplay "Druzhit' Nam Nado". "Отчего", penned by Yury Antonov, initially was played live in 1972–73 as "Двенадцать месяцев" with alternate lyrics but the same arrangement. This song did not appear on the 2009 re-issue, as Antonov inhibited to re-issue his songs on CDs.

=== Side one ===
No.	Title	Writer(s)	Length
1.	"Любовь – огромная страна"	Rychkov / Derbenyov	2:54
2.	"Я к тебе не подойду"	Tukhmanov / Derbenyov, Shaferan	4:04
3.	"Отчего"	Antonov / Sashko	03:13
4.	"Вечная весна"	Tukhmanov / Shaferan	03:26
5.	"Что такого"	Slobodkin / Derbenyov	03:33
6.	"Это Москва"	Tukhmanov / Derbenyov, Shaferan	02:55

=== Side two ===
No.	Title	Writer(s)	Length
7.	"Наша песня"	Gamaliya / Tanich	03:22
8.	"Качели"	Dyachkov / Derbenyov	05:01
9.	"А мне-то зачем"	Slobodkin	02:56
10.	"Скорый поезд"	Tukhmanov / Haritonov	3:48
11.	"Всегда вдали"	Adler / Derbenyov	4:32

== Personnel ==
- Pavel Slobodkin – bandleader, keyboards, piano, arrangement;
- Alexander Lerman – lead vocals (allegedly, played bass guitar on Что такого, statement denied on official website guestroom);
- Anatoliy Alyoshin – background vocals, lead vocals on Качели;
- Alexander Barykin – vocals (featured a guest musician on Вечная весна, as when the recording took place he wasn't officially employed in the band);
- Alexei Puzyryov – rhythm guitar, lead guitar on "Что такого", "Наша песня" and "Качели", arrangement on most of songs;
- Gennadiy Makeev (brother of A. Puzyryov) – arrangement on "Качели";
- Valeriy Habazin – rhythm guitar on tracks 1,2.
- Igor Degtiariuk – lead guitar on Скорый поезд and Всегда вдали (and allegedly by his own reckoning, on Качели);
- Evgeny Kazantsev – bass guitar on all tracks;
- Alexander Buinov – keyboards (Ionica-73, Hammond);
- Vladimir Polonsky – drums;
- Alexander Chinenkov – trumpet, small percussion.
- Nikolai Danilin – sound engineer on Вечная весна, Это Москва and Скорый поезд.
- Eduard Shakhnazaryan – sound engineer on Что такого Качели and Я к тебе не подойду

== CD-issue ==
In 2009, the album was issued on CD with 8 bonus tracks, recorded in 1971–1975. Some of them were never released on EPs, some of them were. The release of bonus material is a part of Pavel Slobodkin's center works, subsequent to the releases of two compilation albums in 2007 (with David Tukhmanov's songs as well as a greatest hits album named "Когда молчим вдвоём") and the CD-issue of the album Muzykalniy Globus. Apart from the material from the album, excluding "Отчего", it features non-album songs. "Пойду ли, выйду ль я" is a remake of a traditional Russian folk song, sung by Igor Gataullin. It was recorded in Berlin within a Germany tour in April 1976 and is notable for a hard rock arrangement with an opening guitar riff, strongly resembling Deep Purple's Sail Away riff.
