= VIS Limunada =

Serbian pop band

VIS Limunada ВИС Лимунада
- Origin: Belgrade, Serbia
- Genres: Pop; Schlager
- Years active: 2012–present
- Members: Miodrag Ninić; Vladimir Živković; Marija Kovačina; Stefan Pejatović; Dragan Milovanović; Luka Arežina
- Past members: Duška Rajković; Borko Milojković; Tihomir Živković
- Website: vislimunada.com

VIS Limunada (Serbian Cyrillic: ВИС Лимунада, lit. 'VIS Lemonade') is a Serbian music group from Belgrade. They perform covers and original songs in the style of songs from the 1950s and 1960s. In 2022 they participated in Pesma za Evroviziju '22, Serbia's selection show for the Eurovision Song Contest 2022, with the song "Pesma ljubavi".

== Discography ==
=== Studio albums ===
- Kreni – Studio B Session (2015)
- Limunada (2016)
