= Kak Prekrasen Etot Mir =

Как Прекрасен Этот Мир

EP by Vesyolye Rebyata
- Released: 1972
- Genre: Beat
- Label: Мелодия

Vesyolye Rebyata chronology
| Как Прекрасен Этот Мир (1972) | Lubov' Ogromnaya Strana (1974) |

Kak Prekrasen Etot Mir (What a wonderful world) is an EP by Russian rock band Vesyolye Rebyata.

== Style ==
One of the most successful EP "Vesyolye Rebyata". The mini-album opens poignant modern classical music-ballad "Как Прекрасен Этот Мир", which is quite different from the other songs. Creation of the other songs in the genre beat music, with different influences. For example, purely beat music track "Рыбацкая Песня", a bit like the song "На чем стоит любовь" from debut EP, and the vocals in this song, at times reminiscent of a fragment of the famous hit "Twist and Shout". In addition to the standard rock band instruments on the album as present and wind instruments. On the two remaining songs, besides beat music and rock, and there is the influence of Russian traditional pop.

== Track listing ==
1. Как Прекрасен Этот Мир
2. Рыбацкая Песня
3. Любовь – Дитя Планеты
4. Песня, Моя Песня
