= Dos Mukasan =

Kazakh rock band formed in 1967

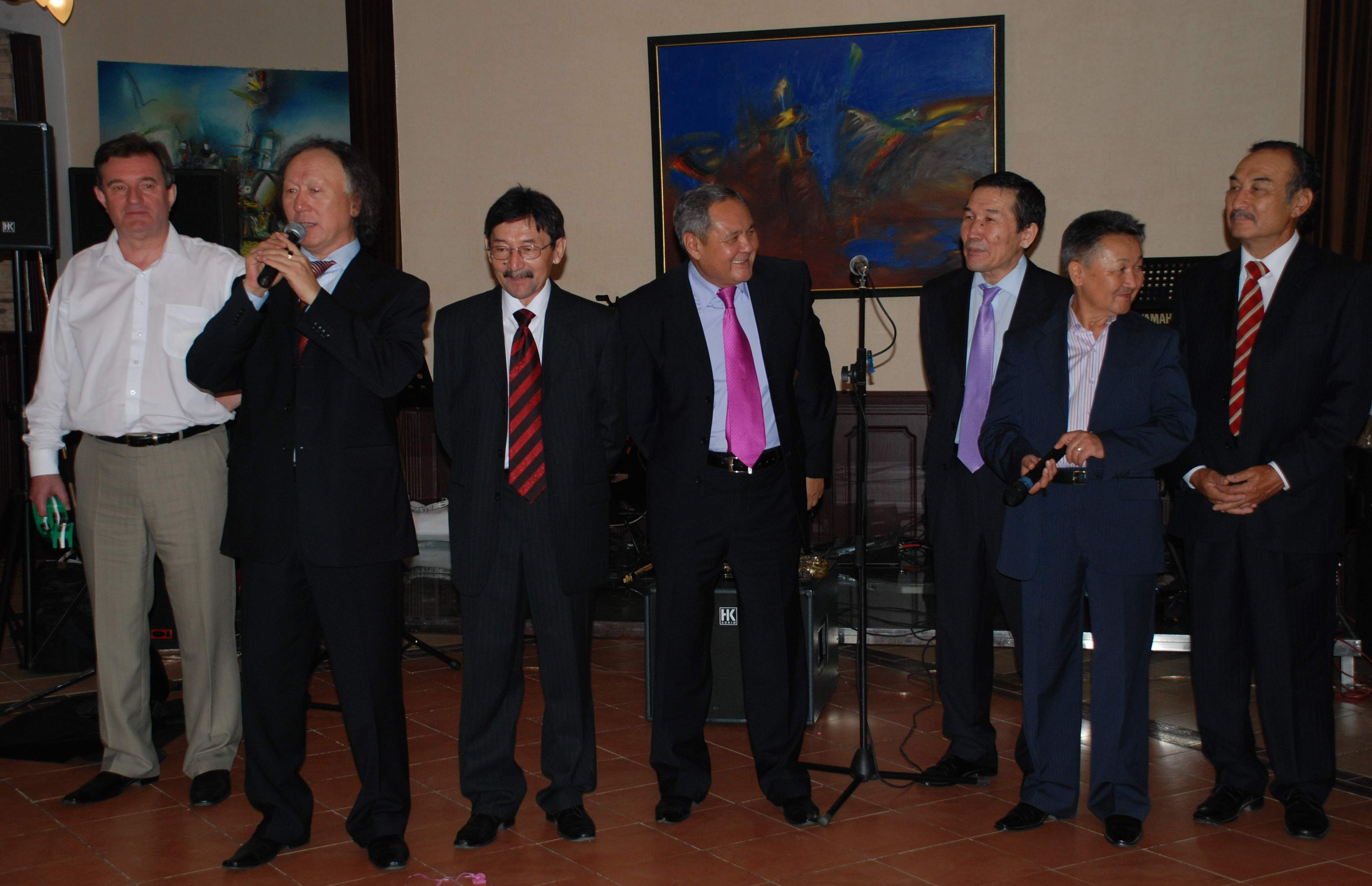
The band in 2008

Dos-Mukasan (Kazakh: Дос-Мұқасан, Dos-Mūqasan) is a Kazakh rock band, which was formed in Almaty Region in 1967 as VIA. The first lineup was formed in 1967 by four students of the Almaty Polytechnic Institute, Dosym Suleyev, Murat Kusainov, Kamit Sanbayev, and Alexander Litvinov. They first performed in Bayanaul on 1 September 1967. The name of the band was the abbreviation of their names. The band initially positioned as performers of Kazakh folk music and were criticized because they used guitars rather than traditional Kazakh musical instruments and used several vocals simultaneously. On the other hand, they were clearly inspired by contemporary Western groups like The Beatles and The Rolling Stones. Dos Mukasan became the first Kazakh group playing rock music and the first group trying to create the fusion of rock music and Kazakh folk music.

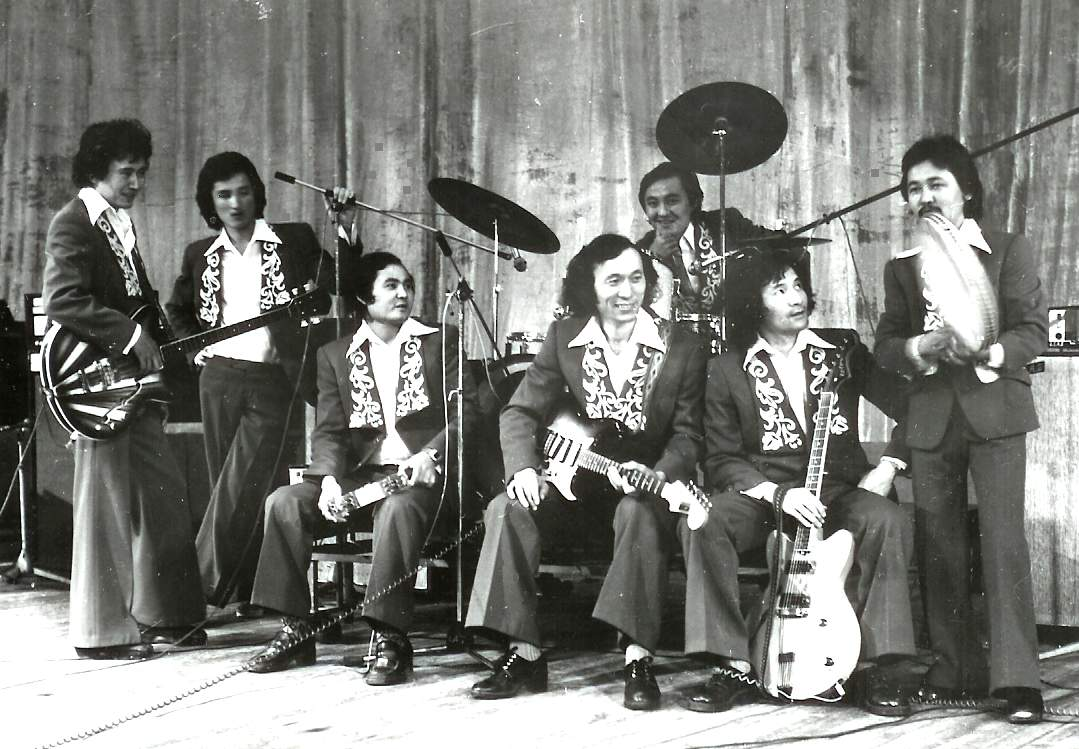
The band performing live

The lineup of the band changed several times. In the end of the 1970s, the period when Dos Mukasan was the most popular, it included Murat Kusainov, Nurtas Kusainov, Bakhyt Dzhumadilov, Askar Dzhankushukov, Bagdad Aydarkhanov, Arsen Bayanov, and Murat Sarybayev. The band stopped performing and disintegrated in the 1990s; Murat Kusainov decided to continue performing with young musicians, however, since 2000 the old lineup of Dos Mukasan returned to perform.

In the 1970s, the band won a number of prizes in music festivals in the Soviet Union. A monument to the group was opened in Pavlodar in the 2000s.
