= Belikov =

Belikov (Russian: Беликов), feminine: Belikova is a Russian surname, associated with the noble Russian Belikov family. It may also be transliterated as Byelikov / Byelikova. Notable people with the surname include:

- Anastasia Belikova, birth name of Anastasiya Kodirova, Russian volleyball player
- Ivan Belikov (footballer, born 1996), Russian footballer who plays as a midfielder
- Ivan Belikov (footballer, born 2004), Russian footballer who plays as a defender
- Daria Belikova, Russian handballer
- Marina Belikova, Russian sport shooter
- Nina Belikova, Russian long-distance runner
- Konstantin Belikov (1909–1987), Russian football defender and referee
- Sergey Belikov (born 1954), Russian singer, musician and composer
- Marina Belikova (born 1985), Russian sport shooter
- Volodymyr Byelikov (born 1998), Ukrainian ice dancer

== Fictional characters ==
- Svetlana Belikova, character in Resident Evil Damnation
- Dimitri Belikov, character in Vampire Academy and its adaptations
- Belikov, a main character in The Man in the Case, short story by Anton Chekhov
