= Alexander Barykin =

Soviet-Russian singer-songwriter (1952–2011)

Aleksander Barykin
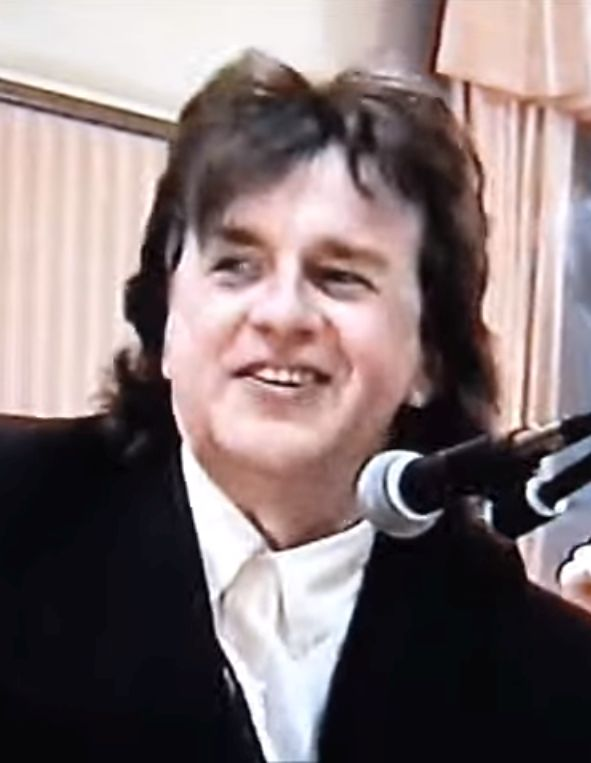
- Alexander Barykin in 1995

Background information
- Also known as: Aleksander Barykin
- Born: Aleksander Aleksandrovich Byrykin; February 18, 1952 Beryozovo, Khanty–Mansia, USSR
- Died: March 26, 2011 (aged 59) Orenburg, Russia
- Occupations: singer, songwriter
- Instrument: Guitar
- Years active: 1973–2011
- Label: Melodiya

Aleksander Aleksandrovich Barykin (Byrykin) (Russian: Александр Александрович Барыкин (Бырыкин); February 18, 1952 — March 26, 2011) was a Soviet and Russian singer and songwriter.

== Biography ==
Alexander Barykin was born on February 18, 1952, in Beryozovo (Khanty-Mansia). He was a young boy when his parents moved to Lyubertsy, a suburb near Moscow. While still in school, Barykin sang and played guitar in an amateur band called Allegro. He went to musical school and then earned a degree in the classical vocal program at the Gnesins Musical College.

In the 1970s, Barykin was a member of the VIA bands Moskvichi (1973 — 1974), Vesiolie Rebiata (1974 — 1976, 1978 — 1979), Samotsvety (1976) and Jemchug (1976 — 1978).

In August, 1979, Barykin collaborated with the guitarist of Samotsvety, Vladimir Kuzmin to organize a new band called Carnaval. It was considered to be the first Russian band to embrace new wave. Carnaval combined a range of styles and influences, including glam rock, rhythm and blues, and white reggae on the base of Russian melodic. In 1982, Kuzmin has organized his band Dynamic, and Barykin became the single leader of Carnaval. In 1985, the band experimented with pop rock (and after the album Rock'n'roll Marathon passed to this style). In 1989, they released a pure rock album Hey, Look! and broke up soon thereafter.

As member of Carnaval, Barykin released 15 albums, including 3 releases with the Soviet recording monopolist Melodiya, 5 compilations, and 1 live album at Moroz Records (see Discography of Carnaval). In 1990, Barykin started a successful solo career (in the beginning as a pop singer) and subsequently released 13 albums (see Discography of Alexander Barykin).

Barykin is considered by many as a father of Russian reggae. (See in External links Video No. 2 and Video No. 4 from second row and Video No. 1 from third row).

A number of Russian musicians and songwriters were influenced by Barykin. For example, the reggae styled hit of the band Chaif Argentina — Jamaica 5:0 was made in a style reminiscent of Barykin. In 2008 he sang the cover version in the TV show Superstar. Vadim Nikolayev: "I regretted that it isn't Barykin's song almost ten years. But it became his song — at least for me" (Notes About Russian Rock).

In the 1990s, Barykin began to experience problems with his vocal chords. After Islands (1996), Barykin did not release any new songs for a period of four years. After that period, he recovered and was able to continue his solo career.

Near the end of his life, Barykin had reconstituted Carnaval together with such ex-members as guitarist Andrey Vypov, saxophonist and flutist Valentin Ilyenko, drummer Alexander Filonenko, and bass player Petr Makienko, with whom he played in Jemchug.

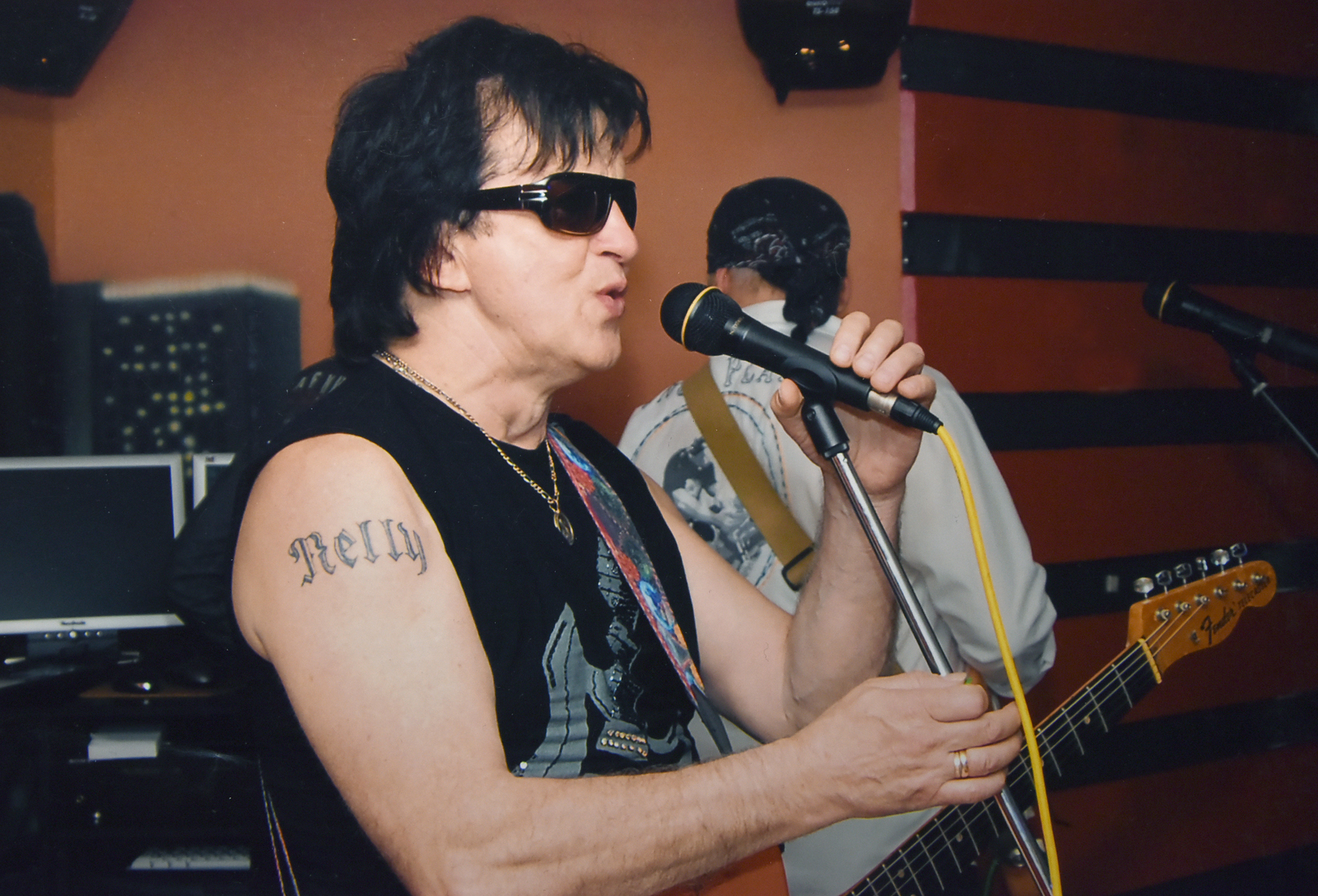
Alexander Barykin, 2005 год

== Personal life ==
Barykin had four children: Georgy Byrykin (born in 1974, also known as Georgy Barykin, singer, songwriter, the musician, he played on a guitar in the accompanying band of his father), Kira Byrykina (born in 1992, adopted in 1995), Yevgeniya Barykina (born on April 10, 2006) from his second marriage with singer Nelly Barykina (maiden name was Vlasova), and illegitimate son Timur Sayed-Shah (born in 1987, became a rapper) from singer Raisa Sayed-Shah.

Barykin died of a heart attack on March 26, 2011, in Orenburg after a concert. He was 59 years old. The funeral arrangements were handled by Iosif Kobzon. Alexander Barykin was buried on 29 March 2011 at Troyekurovskoye Cemetery (Section 6) in Moscow. The monument on the singer's grave was erected in 2012 by sculptor Valery Belykh, with funding provided by Alla Pugacheva and Andrey Konovalov, the mayor of Novokuybyshevsk, who had been a longtime friend of the musician.

== Discography of Carnaval ==
Russian title	English translation	Year
Карнавал	Carnaval Rock Band	1981(EP, Melodiya)

1. "Sudden Impasse" (music by Vladimir Kuzmin, lyrics by Igor Kokhanovsky)
2. "Empty Word" (music by Vladimir Kuzmin and Vladimir Matetsky, lyrics by Igor Kokhanovsky)
3. "Now I Know" (music by Alexander Barykin and Vladimir Kuzmin, lyrics by Igor Kokhanovsky)

Personnel
Vladimir Kuzmin (ex-Nadejda, ex-Samotsvety), lead vocals (2), lead guitar, keyboards, violin, flute, vocoder (2), back vocals (1, 3)
Alexander Barykin, lead vocals (1, 3), rhythm guitar, acoustic guitar, back vocals (2)
Evgeny Kazantsev (ex-Vesiolie Rebiata, ex-Samotsvety), bass, back vocals
Vladimir Boldyrev (ex-Modo), drums

- 1981 The Superman
- 1982 Merry-Go-Round
- 1983 The Actor (live)
- 1984 Radio (CD 2003)
- 1985 Steps. Title of other edition is The Spare. (LP, Melodiya, CD 1996, Moroz Records)

See also David Tukhmanov

- 1985 When We Fall in Love
- 1986 Rock'n'roll Marathon
- 1987 Bouquet (LP, Melodiya, CD 2003)
- 1989 Hey, look! (LP, Melodiya, CD 1996, Moroz Records)
- 1996 Lifebuoy (CD, compilation, Moroz Records)
- 1996 Airport (CD, compilation, Moroz Records)
- 1997 Carnaval and Alexander Barykin (CD, compilation in the cycle Legends of Russian Rock, Moroz Records)
- 1997 Sudden Impasse (CD, compilation, Moroz Records)
- 1997 I Will Ride My Bicycle Far (CD, compilation, Moroz Records)
- 2001 Live in Kuybyshev (CD, recorded in 1982, Moroz Records)

== Discography of Alexander Barykin ==
- 1986 Single (Igor Nikolayev's songs)
- 1991 Blue Eyes
- 1994 Festival Robin Hood in Lytkarino (live)
- 1994 Russian Beach
- 1995 It's Never Too Late
- 1996 Islands
- 2001 Volga
- 2002 Pray, Child!
- 2003 River and Sea
- 2004 Now I Know (live)
- 2005 Love
- 2006 Nelly
- 2008 Rocket from the South (Alexander Barykin & Dub TV)
- 2009 Rock (Latin block letters) Ne (Russian block letters) Star (Latin block letters) (the game of words — Not a Rock Star or Rock Isn't Old)

== Tribute ==
- 2002 Star Carnival (starring Alla Pugacheva, Alexander Malinin, Dmitry Malikov, Tatiana Bulanova, Vitas, Rondo, Christina Orbakaite, Alexander Marshal, Andrey Gubin, Tatiana Ovsienko, Nogu Svelo!, Premier Minister, Mikhey And Jumanjie, Georgy Barykin, Sasha Posdnyakov)
