= Evgeniy Morozov (choirmaster) =

Soviet and Russian choirmaster (1944–2016)

Evgeniy Morozov Евгений Морозов
- Born: 2 May 1944; Moscow, Russian SFSR, Soviet Union
- Died: 1 December 2016 (aged 72) Moscow, Russia
- Occupations: Choral conductor, composer

Evgeniy Ivanovich Morozov (Russian: Евгений Иванович Морозов; 2 May 1944 – 1 December 2016) was a Soviet and Russian choirmaster and the founder and director of the Kamchatka Choir Capella.

== Biography ==
In 1961, Morozov graduated from the State Choir School with a degree in choir conducting. In 1965, he graduated from the choir department of the Moscow Conservatory. In 1973, he completed postgraduate studies at the Moscow Conservatory. At the same time, in 1963–1965 he worked as a choirmaster of the Palace of Culture at the Moscow Metallurgical Plant. In 1965, he worked as a singing teacher at secondary school No. 795 in Moscow.

From 1965, for more than 30 years, he worked in Petropavlovsk-Kamchatsky in Kamchatka Krai as a teacher and head of the conducting and choir department of the Kamchatka Regional Music School. In 1967, he founded and until the end of his life headed the Kamchatka Choir Capella as artistic director and conductor. In 1986, he initiated the creation of the Kamchatka Musical Spring festival (since 1995, an international festival). For more than 30 years, he headed the work of the Kamchatka branch of the Musical Society of Russia.

From 1979, he studied the musical folklore of the indigenous peoples of Kamchatka. He was the first person in Russia to write arrangements of Koryak, Aleut and Chukchi folk melodies for an academic choir. In 2012, he became a member of the Union of Composers of Russia.

Morozov was the author of the music for the anthem of Kamchatka Krai (2009, lyrics by the poet Boris Dubrovin).

Morozov died on 1 December 2016 after a long illness.

Morozov had a daughter, Natalia.

== Awards and recognition ==
- Order of Honour (19 May 2005) – for services in the field of culture and art, many years of productive activity
- Order of Friendship of Peoples (1986)
- Honoured Artistic Figure of the Russian Federation (28 April 1994) – for services in the field of art
- Honoured Cultural Worker of the RSFSR (1 February 1978) – for services in the field of Soviet culture
- Laureate of All-Russian festivals (1977–1998)
- Laureate of International Competitions (Greece, 1994; Spain, 1996)
- Kamchatka Regional State Prize (1995)
- Governor of Kamchatka Prize (1996)
- Honorary Citizen of Petropavlovsk-Kamchatsky (2000), Honorary Resident of Kamchatka Territory (2016)
