= Dmitry Malikov =

Russian singer (born 1970)

- Дмитрий Маликов
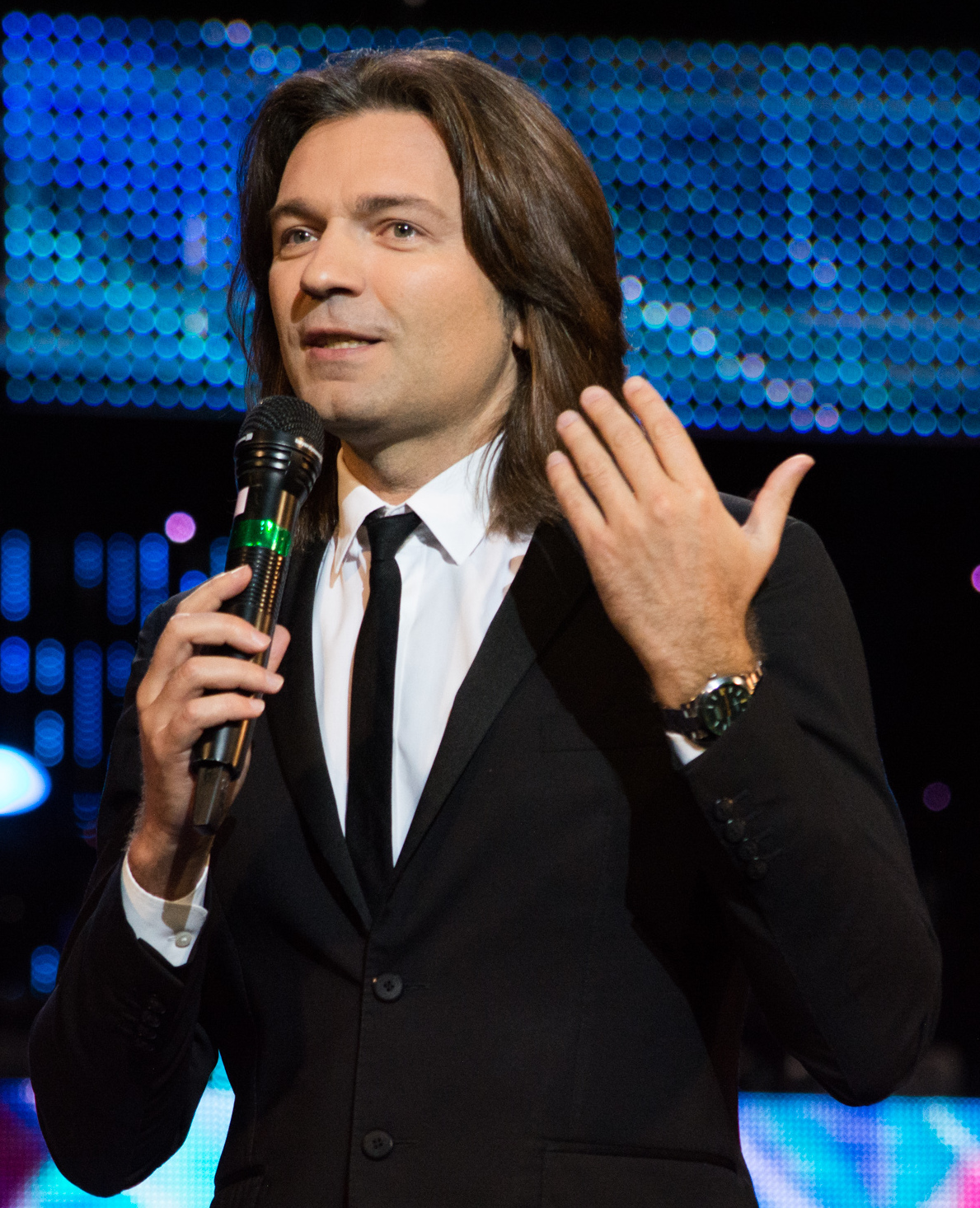
- Malikov in 2015
- Born: 29 January 1970 (age 56); Moscow, Russian SFSR, Soviet Union
- Education: Moscow Conservatory
- Occupations: Singer, composer, actor, record producer
- Years active: 1986–present
- Title: People's Artist of Russia (2010)
- Awards: Order of Friendship (2015)
- Musical career
- Genres: Pop; Instrumental; Classical
- Instruments: Vocals; Keyboard instrument
- Dmitry Malikov's voice Malikov's interview on the Echo of Moscow program, 15 November 2011
- Website: www.malikov.ru

Dmitry Yurievich Malikov (Russian: Дмитрий Юрьевич Маликов; born 29 January 1970) is a Russian singer, composer, occasional actor and a recent record producer.

== Early life ==
Dmitry Malikov, who goes by his nickname Dima, was born in Moscow. His mother, Lyudmila Mikhailovna Vyunkova, was a dancer, and his father, Yuriy Fedorovich Malikov, was part of a band called Samotsvety (Самоцветы). This combination of parental talent had a large influence in his becoming a musician. In the early 70s, Samotsvety became one of the most popular groups in the USSR, selling several million records. His younger sister, Inna Malikova (Инна Маликова), is also a recording artist. As his father was often on tour, Malikov was brought up by his grandparents.

== Music ==
In 1985 Malikov performed two songs at the Soundtrack Concert (звуковая дорожка / Zvukovaya Dorozhka) organized by the popular Russian newspaper Moskovsky Komsomolets, which was his first major performance.

In 1994 Malikov released his first album, Until Tomorrow (До завтра / Do Zavtra), which had been released twice previously, once in 1993 as With You (С тобой / S Toboy) and in 1992, as Searching Soul (Поиски Души / Poiski Dushi). This was a compilation of his early hits, and the albums were nearly identical. He also released a second album in 1994, titled Come to Me (Иди ко мне / Idi Ko Mne). In 1996, Malikov released an album called Fear of Flying (Страх полета / Strah Polyeta).

The 1998 release of My Distant Star (Звезда моя далекая / Zvezda Moya Dalyokaya) saw one of his most successful singles, "You're the Only One" (Ты одна, ты такая / Ti Odna, Ti Takaya). 2000's Beads (Бисер / Biser) continued Malikov's progression as an artist, with the inclusion of several hard-hitting tracks (including the title track) favoring harder synth sounds.

A compilation of instrumentals, 2001's Game (Игра / Igra), showcased Malikov's creativity. The album contained many ethereal arrangements reminiscent of Fear of Flying. While all songs showcased his pianistic prowess, one in particular, "Wanderer" (Странник / Strannik) ends with a chilling classical climax. Perhaps the most innovative song is the 1955 standard, "Moscow Nights" (Подмосковные вечера / Podmoskovnye Vechera), backed by jazz drums and a chorus of crickets chirping in time. 2002 saw a return to Malikov's thoroughly-enjoyable pop songwriting with Love Story.

== Pianomania ==
In 2006, Malikov brought Pianomania (PIANOMANIЯ), a mixture of instrumental music, dance shows and colorful performances, to life. In December 2010, in France, Dmitry Malikov presented a show of classical music Symphonic Mania – creative development and a new vision of the project PIANOMANIYA.

== Awards ==
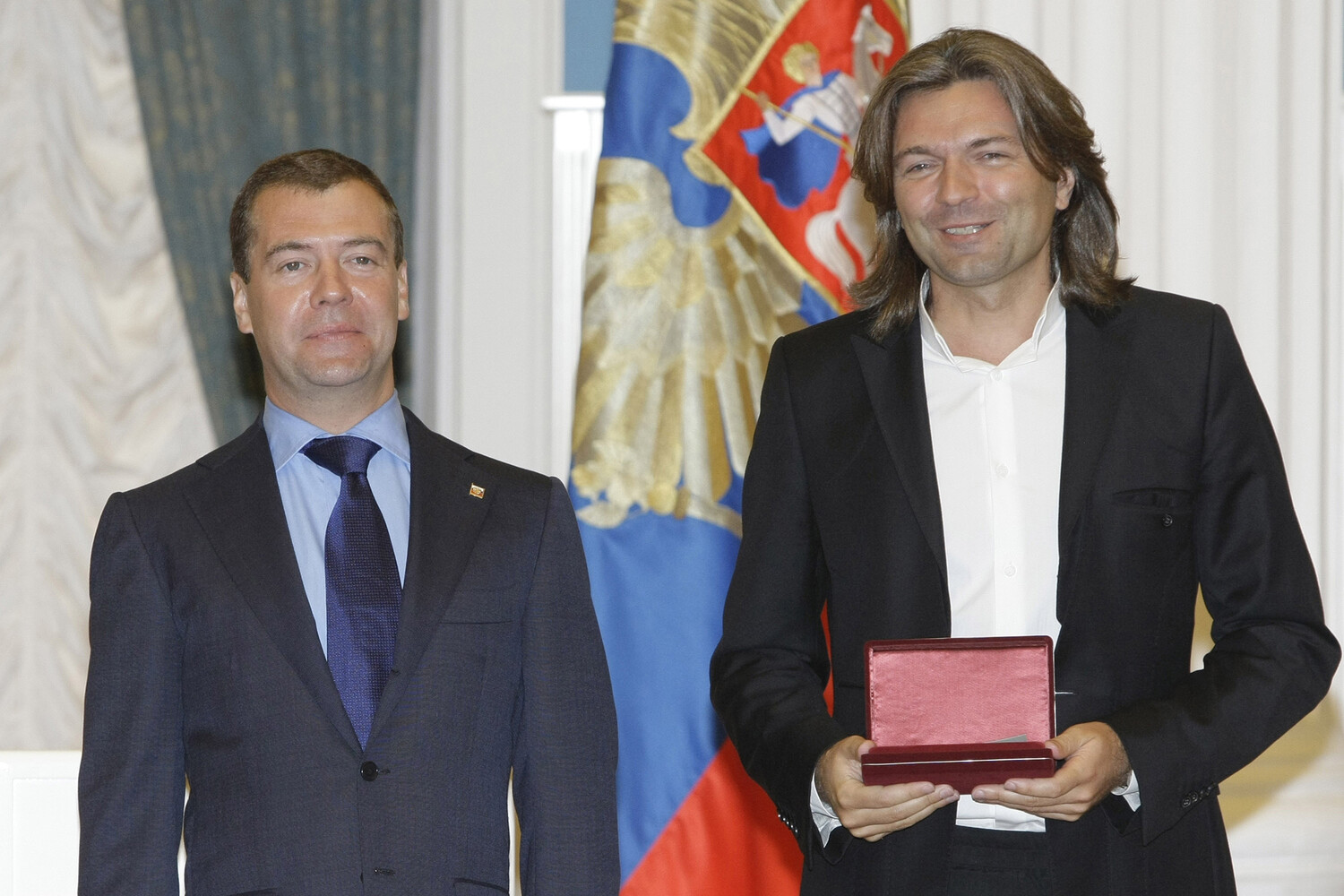
With Dmitry Medvedev on 26 July 2010

- Meritorious Artist (Deserved Artist) of Russia (Заслуженный артист России) (22 November 1999)
- World's Best-Selling Russian Recording Artist of the Year – World Music Awards (1995)
- People's Gold Grammophone (народной "Золотой граммофон") – Russian Radio (1996, 1997, 1998, 1999, 2001, 2002, 2003, 2005, 2015, 2019)
- Hundred-Percent Hit (Стопудовый хит) – Hit FM (Хит-FM) (1998, 1999, 2000)

Awards
World Music Awards
Preceded by 1994 Alexander Malinin	Best-Selling Russian Artist; 1995; Dmitry Malikov	Succeeded by 1996 Philipp Kirkorov

== Discography ==
Album	Track listing	Release date
My, my Моя, моя (Moya, moya)	1. Моя, моя (My, my); 2. Радио-осень (Radio-Fall); 3. Дорога к дому (The Way Home); 4. Скорый поезд (Highball); 5. Тайная история (The Secret History); 6. Солнца луч (Sunbeam); 7. Марракеш (Marrakesh); 8. Полцарства (My Kingdom); 9. Расцвела сирень (Lilac Blossom); 10. Река (River); 11. Радио-осень (Aigorhythm Remix) (Radio-Fall (Aigorhythm Remix)); 12. Моя, моя (Remix Dj Vini) (My, my (Remix Dj Vini))	2009
The Blank Slate С чистого листа (S chistogo lista)	1. С чистого листа (The Blank Slate); 2. Не скучай (Don't Be Sad); 3. Ты и я (You and Me); 4. Если (Esli); 5. Там за облаками (There in the Clouds); 6. Бессонные ночи (Sleepless Nights); 7. Все, как ты хотела (Everything For You); 8. И все-таки я люблю (I Still Love You); 9. Нравишься (Temper); 10. Мама-лето (Summer Mom); 11. Ласковая (Affectionate); 12. Вишневая смола (Cherry Gum); 13. Ты и я – дуэт с Л. Валевская (You and Me – duet with L. Valevskaya); Bonus videos: 1. С чистого листа (The Blank Slate); 2. Нравишься (Temper)	2008
Pianomania Pianomaniя (Pianomaniya)	Version 1: 1. Ночь в Мадриде (Night in Madrid); 2. Лола (Lola); 3. Семиречье (Seven Rivers); 4. Дыши (Breathe); 5. Одиссей (Odysseus); 6. Земля обетованная (Promised Land); 7. Прощай, жестокий мир (Goodbye, Cruel World); 8. Барабаны судьбы (Drums of Destiny); 9. Ласточки (Swallows); 10. Стефания (Stephanie); 11. Второе дыхание (Second Wind); 12. В поисках ангела (In Search of an Angel); 13. Танец рыцарей (Dance of the Knights); Version 2: 1. Ночь в Мадриде (Night in Madrid); 2. Лола (Lola); 3. Семиречье (Seven Rivers); 4. Дыши (Breathe); 5. Одиссей (Odysseus); 6. Земля обетованная (Promised Land); 7. Прощай, жестокий мир (Goodbye, Cruel World); 8. Ласточки (Swallows); 9. Стефания (Stephanie); 10. Второе дыхание (Second Wind); 11. В поисках ангела (In Search of an Angel); 12. Танец рыцарей (Dance of the Knights); 13. Если (Esli); 14. Ты и я (You and I); Version 3 (2010, "Pianomaniя BEST"): 1. Лола (Lola); 2. Ночь в Мадриде (Night in Madrid); 3. Алтай (Altai); 4. Дыши (Breathe); 5. Одиссей (Odysseus); 6. Страх полёта (Fear of Flying); 7. Дельфины (Dolphins); 8. 12; 9. Стефания (Stephanie); 10. В поисках ангела (In Search of an Angel); 11. Вера (Vera); 12. Кто стрелял в джаз? (Who Shot at Jazz?); Version 4 (2010, "Pianomaniя BEST" (unofficial)): 1. Лола (Lola); 2. Ночь в Мадриде (Night in Madrid); 3. Алтай (Altai); 4. Дыши (Breathe); 5. Одиссей (Odysseus); 6. Страх полёта (Fear of Flying); 7. Дельфины (Dolphins); 8. 13; 9. Стефания (Stephanie); 10. В поисках ангела (In Search of an Angel); 11. Вера (Vera); 12. Кто стрелял в джаз? (Who Shot at Jazz?); Version 5 (2010, also "Pianomaniя BEST" (unofficial)): 1. Лола (Lola); 2. Ночь в Мадриде (Night in Madrid); 3. Алтай (Altai); 4. Дельфины (Dolphins); 5. Дыши (Breathe); 6. 13; 7. Одиссей (Odysseus); 8. Стефания (Stephanie); 9. Страх полёта (Fear of Flying); 10. В поисках ангела (In Search of an Angel); 11. Вера (Vera); 12. Кто стрелял в джаз? (Who Shot at Jazz?)	2007
Best Songs Лучшие песни (Luchshie pesni)	1. Вишневая смола (Cherry Gum); 2. Не скучай (Don't Be Sad); 3. Love Story; 4. Черный дрозд и белый аист (Blackbird and White Stork); 5. Если я останусь один (If I Am Alone); 6. Еще, еще (More, More); 7. Мама лето (Summer Mom); 8. Бисер (Beads); 9. С днем рождения, мама (Happy Birthday, Mom); 10. Птицелов (Birder); 11. Ты одна, ты такая (You're the one, you're great); 12. Выпью до дна (Drinking to the Dregs); 13. Звезда моя далекая (My Distant Star); 14. На полночных бульварах (Midnight at the Boulevards); 15. Иди ко мне (Come To Me); 16. Нет, ты не для меня (No, you're not for me); 17. Ты моей никогда не будешь (You'll never be mine); 18. До завтра (Until Tomorrow)	2004
The Best	1. Ты одна, ты такая (You're the one, you're great); 2. Шепотом (Whisper); 3. Черный Дрозд и Белый Аист (Blackbird and white Stork); 4. Ты не прячь улыбку (You do not hide your smile); 5. Выпью до дна (Drinking to the dregs); 6. До завтра (Until Tomorrow); 7. Нет, ты не для меня (No, you're not for me); 8. Лола (Lola); 9. Ты моей никогда не будешь (You'll never be mine); 10. С днем рождения, мама (Happy Birthday, Mom); 11. Звезда моя далекая (My Distant Star); 12. Иди ко мне (Come To Me); 13. Love Story; 14. Студент (Student); 15. После бала (After the Ball); 16. Мама лето (Summer Mom); 17. Отпусти XX век (20th Century)	2003
Love Story	1. Love Story; 2. 100 поцелуев (100 Kisses); 3. Птицелов (Birder); 4. Шепотом (Whisper); 5. Два слова (Two Words); 6. Кто тебе сказал (Who Told You); 7. Черный дрозд и белый аист (Blackbird and White Stork); 8. Грех (Sin); 9. Волки (Wolves); 10. Сатиновые берега (Satin Coast); 11. Ты одна, ты такая (You're the one, you're great) (Dmitriy Malikov and Banda Andryuha); 12. Птицелов (Dj Shuri Remix) (Birder (Dj Shuri Remix)); 13. Шепотом (slowly version) (Whisper (slowly version))	2002
Game Игра (Igra)	1. Желаю тебе (I Wish for You); 2. Летний дождь (Summer Rain); 3. Ещё, ещё (More, More); 4. Тёмная ночь (Dark Night); 5. Не отрекаются, любя (Don't Deny your Love); 6. Спасибо, родная (Thank you, dear); 7. Подмосковные вечера (Moscow Nights); 8. Я тебя никогда не забуду (I will Never Forget You); 9. До свидания, Москва (Goodbye, Moscow); 10. Странник (Wanderer); 11. На Тихорецкую (Na Tihoretskuyu); 12. Желаю тебе (remix) (I Wish for You (remix))	2001
Beads Бисер (Biser)	1. Зови – не зови (Call – Do not call); 2. Если я останусь один (If I'm Alone); 3. Бисер (Beads); 4. Она (One); 5. Он один (He is one); 6. Апрель (April); 7. С днем рождения, мама (Happy Birthday, Mom); 8. До утра (Until Morning); 9. Зимушка (Winter); 10. Две ладони (Two Palms); 11. На полночных бульварах (On the Midnight Avenues); 12. Если я останусь один (If I Remain Alone)	2000
My Distant Star Звезда моя далекая (Zvezda Moya Dalokaya)	1. Ты одна, ты такая (You're the Only One); 2. Звезда моя далекая (My Distant Star); 3. На полночных бульварах (Midnight at the Boulevards); 4. Этой ночью (Tonight); 5. После бала (After the Ball); 6. Бумажный змей (Kite); 7. Краденое счастье (дуэт с Н. Королёвой) (Stolen Happiness (duet with N. Korolyovoj)); 8. Не плачь (Don't cry); 9. Сюзанна (Suzanna); 10. Дело вкуса (A Matter of Taste); 11. Еще, еще (More, More); 12. Звезда моя далекая (remix) (My Distant Star (remix))	1998
Fear of Flying Страх полета (Strah Polyeta)	1. Intro; 2. Лола (Lola); 3. Страх полёта (Fear of Flying); 4. Virtuoso Misterioso; 5. Дельфины (Dolphins); 6. Тарантино твист (Tarantino Twist); 7. Рикошет (Ricochet); 8. Пиано – Мания (Piano Mania); 9. Алтай (Altai); 10. Одной ногой в раю (One Foot in Heaven); 11. Finita La Comedia	1997, 2004
100 Nights 100 ночей (Sto Nochey)	1. Ты не прячь улыбку (Don't Hide Your Smile); 2. Выпью до дна (Drinking to the dregs); 3. Прощай, моя блондинка (Farewell, My Blonde); 4. 100 ночей (100 Nights); 5. Перекресток (Crossroads); 6. Чужое счастье (Someone Else's Happiness); 7. Золотой рассвет (Golden Dawn); 8. Блеск холодных глаз (Cold Eyes Shining); 9. Дорога к счастью (The Road to Happiness); 10. Если б ты танцевала (If you Dance); 11. Изумрудный город (Emerald City); 12. Средь неба и земли (Between Heaven and Earth)	1996
Come to Me Иди ко мне (Idi ko Mne)	1. Ты меня никогда не любила (You Never Loved Me); 2. Понимаешь (Understand); 3. Иди ко мне (Come to Me); 4. Попробуй изменить (Try to Change); 5. Письмо в альбом (Silently); 6. Сделай потише (Make It Quiet); 7. Небо голубое (The Blue Sky); 8. Нет, ты не для меня (No, You're Not for Me); 9. Вальсок (Valsok); 10. Каравай (A Loaf); 11. Осенняя звезда (An Autumn Star) duet with L. Dolinoy	1995
Until Tomorrow До завтра (Do Zavtra)	1. До Завтра (Until Tomorrow); 2. Сторона Родная (The Native Party); 3. Студент (The Student); 4. Ты Моей Никогда Не Будешь (You Will Never be Mine); 5. Спой Мне (Sing to Me); 6. Ты Меня Никогда Не Любила (You Never Loved Me); 7. Бедное Сердце (Poor Heart); 8. Золотые Косы (Golden Braids); 9. Все Вернется (All Will Return); 10. Возрождение (Revival); 11. Брачный Кортеж (Wedding Train); 12. Лунный Сон (Lunar Dream); 13. Еще Не Поздно (Not Too Late); 14. С Тобой (With You); 15. Смятение (Confusion)	1994
With You С тобой (S Toboj) (Note: CD: Jeff Records SS93022. Arranged by Дмитрий Маликов, (tracks 1 and 5 only) Виктор Савин and (also tracks 1 and 5 only) Владимир Мухин. Promoted by Дмитрий Маликов, Юрий Маликов, and (tracks 1 and 5 only) Андрей Черкасов. Produced by Дмитрий Маликов. LP: Aprelevka Sound Inc.)	CD: 1. С тобой (With You) — 3.15 (Lyrics: В. Баранов); 2. Еще не поздно (Not Too Late) — 4.16 (Lyrics: Сергей Костров); 3. Cтудент (Student) — 3.28 (Lyrics: Александр Шаганов); 4. Ты моей никогда не будешь (You'll never be mine) — 4.12 (Lyrics: Д. Самойлов); 5. Спой мне (Sing to me) — 3.52 (Lyrics: Александр Шаганов); 6. Ты меня никогда не любила (You Never Loved Me) — 4.11 (Lyrics: Дмитрий Маликов); 7. Бедное сердце (Poor Heart) — 3.32 (Lyrics: Александр Шаганов); 8. Золотые косы (Golden Braids) — 2.59 (Lyrics: Александр Шаганов); 9. Все вернется (All Will Return) — 4.28 (Lyrics: Александр Шаганов); 10. Возрождение (Revival) — 3.57 (Lyrics: Сергей Костров); 11. Брачный кортеж (The Marriage Procession) — 4.11 (Lyrics: Александр Шаганов); 12. Лунный сон (Moon Dream) — 4.10 (Lyrics: Лилия Виноградова); 13. Сторона родная (From Family) — 3.50 (Lyrics: Александр Шаганов); 14. До завтра (Until Tomorrow) — 3.47 (Lyrics: Александр Шаганов); 15. Смятение (Confusion) — 4.37 (Lyrics: Лилия Виноградова); LP: 1. С тобой (With You) — 3.20 (Lyrics: В. Баранов); 2. Спой мне (Sing to me) — 3.57 (Lyrics: Александр Шаганов); 3. Ты моей никогда не будешь (You'll never be mine) — 4.18 (Lyrics: Д. Самойлов); 4. Ты меня никогда не любила (You Never Loved Me) — 4.18 (Lyrics: Дмитрий Маликов); 5. Возрождение (Revival) — 4.04 (Lyrics: Сергей Костров); 6. Сторона родная (From Family) — 3.55 (Lyrics: Александр Шаганов); 7. Золотые косы (Golden Braids) — 3.07 (Lyrics: Александр Шаганов); 8. Бедное сердце (Poor Heart) — 3.32 (Lyrics: Александр Шаганов); 9. Брачный кортеж (The Marriage Procession) — 4.07 (Lyrics: Александр Шаганов); 10. До завтра (Until Tomorrow) — 3.52 (Lyrics: Александр Шаганов)	1993

=== DVDs ===
DVD	Track listing	Release date
Love Story	1. Спой мне (Sing To Me); 2. Иди ко мне (Come To Me); 3. Нет, ты не для меня (No, you're not for me); 4. Выпью до дна (Drinking to the Dregs); 5. Золотой рассвет (Golden Dawn); 6. Ты не прячь улыбку (Do not hide your smile); 7. Лола (Lola); 8. Ты одна, ты такая (You're the one, you're great); 9. До утра (Until The Morning); 10. Если я останусь один (If I'm Alone); 11. Еще, еще (More, More); 12. Звезда моя далекая (My Distant Star); 13. Бисер (Beads); 14. С днем рожденья, мама! (Happy Birthday, Mom!); 15. Снежинка (Snowflake); 16. Отпусти XX век (20th century); 17. Love Story'; 18. Птицелов (Birder); 19. Шепотом (Whisper); 20. До завтра (Дебют в новогоднем огоньке) (Until Tomorrow (New Year debut spark))	2003

== Filmography ==
1. 1992 — Увидеть Париж и умереть — Юра Орехов
2. 1996 — Старые песни о главном 2 — physics teacher
3. 1997 — Старые песни о главном 3 — Аркадий from the "Start" / singer at the disco
4. 2001 — Старые песни о главном. Постскриптум
5. 2005—2006 — Моя прекрасная няня (103 серия «Любовь и супчик», 133 серия «Долгожданная свадьба!») — камео
6. 2006 — Здрасьте, я ваше папо!
7. 2008 — И всё-таки я люблю… (soundtrack)
8. (12 September 2012 – September 2016) Spokoynoy nochi, malyshi! ("Russian: Спокойной ночи, малыши!") (Presenter, himself)

== Personal life ==
In 1999, he married Elena Izakson. They have two children: daughter Stefania (born 2000) and son Mark (born 2018).
