= Belik =

Belik or Byelik (Белик, Бєлік) is an East Slavic surname. Notable people with the surname include:

- Dmitry Belik (1969), Russian politician
- Oleksiy Byelik (born 1981), Ukrainian footballer
- Vera Belik (Ukrainian: Білик; 1921–1944), Ukrainian aircraft navigator

== See also ==
- Jarmila Bělíková (1948–2010), Czech psychologist and activist
