= Boris Dubrovin (mathematician) =

Russian mathematician (1950–2019)

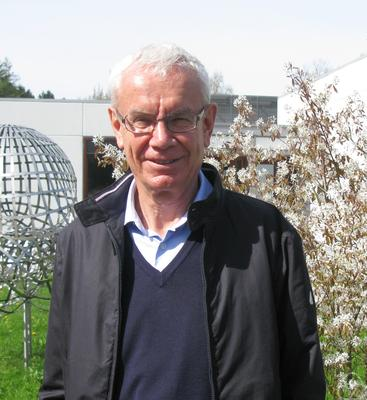
- Born: Boris Anatolievich Dubrovin; 6 April 1950
- Died: 19 March 2019 (aged 68)
- Occupation: Mathematician

Boris Anatolievich Dubrovin (Russian: Борис Анатольевич Дубровин; 6 April 1950 – 19 March 2019) was a Russian mathematician, Doctor of Physical and Mathematical Sciences (1984). After his death, the Dubrovin Medal was created in his memory, and is awarded to promising researchers who make outstanding contributions to the fields of mathematical physics and geometry.

== Biography ==
He graduated from the Faculty of Mechanics and Mathematics of Moscow State University (1972). In 1988–1993, he was Professor of the Department of Higher Geometry and Topology. Between 1990 and his death, he was Professor at Scuola Internazionale Superiore di Studi Avanzati (SISSA) in Trieste, Italy.

He was also member of the Department of Geometry and Topology of the Steklov Institute of Mathematics.

His areas of scientific interests are: theory of integrable systems in geometry and physics, Frobenius manifolds, Gromov–Witten invariants, singularity theory, normal forms of integrable partial differential equations, Hamiltonian perturbations of hyperbolic systems, geometry of isomonodromic deformations, theta functions on Riemann surfaces, and nonlinear waves.

In 1998, he was an Invited Speaker of the International Congress of Mathematicians in Berlin.

== Bibliography ==
- Modern Geometry (1979)
- Modern Geometry. Methods and Applications (1982)
- Modern Geometry. Part 3. Methods of Homology Theory (1984)
- Modern Geometry — Methods and Applications. Part III. Introduction to Homology Theory (1990)
- Modern Geometry. Methods and Applications. Volume 1. Geometry of Surfaces, Transformation groups, and Fields
- Modern Geometry. Methods and Applications. Volume 2. Geometry and Topology of Manifolds (2013)
- Modern Geometry. Methods and applications. Volume 3. Theory of Homology (2013)
- Topology, Geometry, Integrable Systems, and Mathematical Physics: Novikov’s Seminar 2012–2014 (2014)
