= Sergey Belikov =

Russian singer (born 1954)

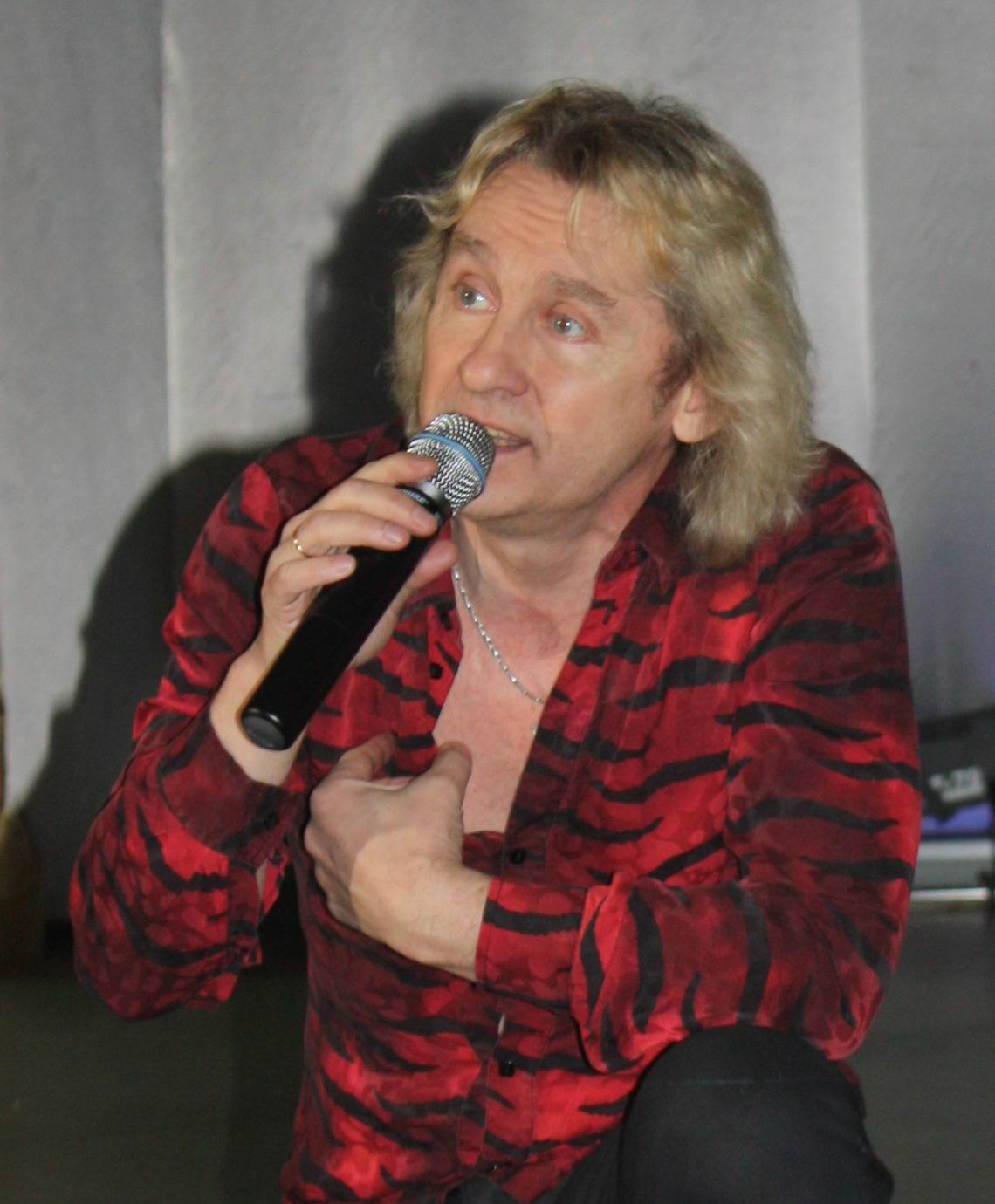

Background information
- Born: October 25, 1954 (age 71); Krasnogorsk, Moscow Oblast, Russian SFSR, USSR
- Genres: Pop
- Occupation: Singer
- Instruments: Vocals, bass guitar
- Years active: 1971–present
- Formerly of: Arax; Samotsvety
- Spouse: Elena
- Website: sergey-belikov.ru

Sergey Grigorievich Belikov (Russian: Серге́й Гри́горьевич Бе́ликов; born October 25, 1954, in Krasnogorsk) is a Russian singer, musician, composer and Honored Artist of Russia (1999).
