= Samotsvety =

Soviet VIA band formed in 1971

- Origin: Moscow, Russian SFSR, Soviet Union
- Genres: Beat, pop rock, soft rock
- Years active: 1971–present
- Label: Melodiya
- Past members: Yuriy Malikov; Vladimir Presnyakov Sr. Andrey Sapunov; Vitaliy Bogdanov; Eduard Krolik; Vladimir Vinokur; Anatoly Mogilevsky; Arkady Khoralov; Alexander Barykin; Vyacheslav Dobrynin; Aleksey Glyzin; Vladimir Kuzmin; Valery Khabazin; Sergey Belikov; Valentin Dyakonov; Dmitry Malikov
- Website: www.samotsvety.ru

Samotsvety (Russian: Самоцветы, which means "Semiprecious Stones") is a Soviet VIA band formed in 1971, in Moscow. It became one of the more successful and better known VIA bands, recording a number of hits and serving as a springboard to fame for several Russian musicians, including Dmitry Malikov, Vladimir Presnyakov Sr., and Alexander Barykin.

== History ==
The band Samotsvety, was founded by Yuriy Malikov, a Recognized National Artist of Russia and the father of Dmitry Malikov. The group produced a string of hits in the 1970s, including "Moy adres Sovetskii Soyuz" (My address is the Soviet Union), "Tam, za oblakami" (There, beyond the clouds), "Vsya zhizn vperedi" (My whole life is still ahead), "Ne povtoriayetsia takoye nikogda" (Something like this will never happen again), "Vse chto v zhizni yest u menia" (All that I have in my life), "Shkonlniy bal" (School dance), and "Na zemlie zhivet liubov" (There lives love on this earth), among others.

The year 1975 was a turning point for the band. It was the year they recorded "Esli budem my vdvoyem" (If it will be the two of us).

The band broke up in the late 1980s when many VIAs were going away as a result of changes in both government censorship and popular tastes. However, in 1996, Yuriy Malikov decided to celebrate the 25-year anniversary of the band by bringing together many of the ex-members for an episode of the television series "Zolotoy shlyager" (Golden hit). The unexpected popularity of the program when it aired made Malikov decide to reconstitute the band.

The forecasting group Samotsvety Forecasting is named after this band.

== Discography ==
1973 — ВИА Самоцветы (VIA Samotsvety)

1974 — У нас молодых (For us, young ones)

1981 — Путь к сердцу (Path to the heart)

1985 — Прогноз погоды (Weather forecast)

1995 — Там за облаками (There, beyond the clouds)

1996 — Всё, что в жизни есть у меня (All that I have in my life)

1996 — Двадцать лет спустя (Twenty years later)

1997 — Мы стали другими (We became different)

2003 — Звёздные имена (Star names)

2004 — Любовное настроение (Mood for love)

2008 — Самоцветы (Samotsvety) GRAND Collection

2009 — Самоцветы (Samotsvety)

2011 — Самоцветы в окружении звёзд (Samotsvety with stars)
