= Kamchatka Choir Capella =

Russian choral collective established in 1967

Kamchatka Choir Capella sdf
- Also known as: Evgeniy Morozov Kamchatka Choir Capella
- Origin: Petropavlovsk-Kamchatsky, Kamchatka Krai, Russia
- Genres: Classical music
- Years active: 1967–present
- Website: kammusic.ru/collectives/kamchatskaya-horovaya-kapella-im-evgeniya-morozova

The Evgeniy Morozov Kamchatka Choir Capella (Russian: Камчатская хоровая капелла имени Евгения Морозова) is a Russian choral collective operating in Petropavlovsk-Kamchatsky, Kamchatka Krai, Russia, since 1967. It is part of the Kamchatka Concert and Philharmonic Association and has won several Russian and international competitions.

== History ==
The Kamchatka Choir Capella was created in 1967. The originator of the idea of the choir and organiser was choirmaster Evgeniy Morozov, who directed the choir until his death on 1 December 2016.

The Kamchatka Choir Capella is a laureate of many prestigious choral art competitions. At the international level, the collective has become four times the laureate of various competitions.

From 1973, tours were organised around the cities of the Soviet Union. In 1980, the first foreign tour of the choir to Bulgaria took place. After a successful performance in the friendly state, the artists of the Kamchatka choir were heard in the United States, Japan, China, France, Spain, Greece, Italy, Germany and other countries. One of the most significant events in the history of the orchestra was a joint performance in 1992 with the Anchorage Choir and the US National Symphony Orchestra under the baton of Mstislav Rostropovich, during which Sergei Prokofiev's cantata Alexander Nevsky was performed.

The repertoire of the choir is diverse and includes both Russian and foreign classics, as well as choral works by contemporary composers and variations on Russian folk songs. Russian sacred music occupies a special place in the performances of the collective. The variations on national melodies of peoples of the north have drawn great success and interest and were included in the choir's concert programs by Evgeniy Morozov. Such works are performed with the participation of national choreographic ensembles.

In October 2002, the Kamchatka Choir Capella took part in the World Choir Olympiad, which took place in the city of Busan in South Korea. Morozov's collective performed in three nominations and managed to win three silver medals. In the summer of 2005 in Rome, Italy, the choir capella won the gold medal in the competition of choral collectives.

On 4 November 2010, a concert by the Kamchatka Choir Capella was organised and held in the Rachmaninoff Concert Hall of the Moscow Conservatory. Pianist David Lerner, who was present at the performance, praised the professionalism of the performers:

"I am delighted with the concert! Everything that has been heard in this room tonight is simply unique. The Kamchatka Capella has all the capabilities, all the high qualities for which our wonderful Russian art is famous. I was amazed by the choral arrangements by Evgeniy Morozov, created on the basis of the folklore of peoples of the north. They are incredible! I rarely go to concerts as a spectator. And what I heard today shocked me. When I first came to Kamchatka in 1936 and brought a piano there, there was a remote province. Now in Petropavlovsk-Kamchatsky for over 40 years there has been such a professional choral group of its own under the direction of Evgeniy Morozov. This is a real miracle!"

On 9 November 2017, the Kamchatka Choir Capella collective was named after its late choirmaster Evgeniy Morozov.

Since March 2017, Vasily Knyazev has been the artistic director and conductor of the choir. In 2017, the collective took part in the international festival "Moscow Autumn". In 2018, the choir capella under the direction of Vasily Knyazev became a participant in the Nevsky Choral Assemblies festival.

== Collective, artists and recordings ==
- Violetta Butuchel – choirmaster of the capella, Honoured Cultural Worker of Russia
- Valery Kravchenko – accompanist, Honoured Artist of Russia

Two vinyl records and four CDs have been released by the choir. One of the CDs presents sacred music by Russian composer Sergei Rachmaninoff.
