= Boris Dubrovin (poet) =

Soviet and Russian poet and songwriter (1926–2020)

- Борис Саввович Дубровин
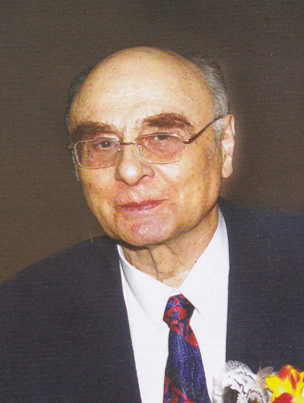
- Born: Boris Savvovich Gall; 4 May 1926; Moscow, RSFSR, USSR
- Died: 25 June 2020 (aged 94); Moscow, Russia
- Occupations: Novelist, poet, songwriter
- Writing career
- Language: Russian

Boris Savvovich Dubrovin (real surname Gall, patronymic in some sources Savvich; Russian: Бори́с Са́ввович Дубро́вин; 24 May 1926 – 25 June 2020) was a Soviet and Russian poet, songwriter and author. He was a veteran of the Great Patriotic War.

== Biography ==
Dubrovin was born in Moscow in 1926. His father was Savva Semenovich Gall, from Uman, Kiev Governorate, and his mother was Esfir Abelevna Khaza, from Pinsk, Minsk Governorate. His father was a typographic worker in his youth, and in the Russian Civil War he was a commissar in the First Cavalry Army. His grandfather was a church watchman. His father had a younger sister. In 1936, when Dubrovin was 9 years old, his father was arrested as an enemy of the people, and after a while his mother was arrested for not reporting on the enemy of the people. His father died in prison, after which he was rehabilitated. His mother, a doctor, served 6 years imprisonment, after which she was disabled. She was also rehabilitated.

Dubrovin graduated from high school, and during World War II he worked as a turner at a defence plant then volunteered for the infantry. From February 1944, he was a submachine gunner in the 95th Rifle Regiment. From July of the same year, he was an air gunner then a mechanic in the 57th Bomber Aviation Regiment of the 221st Air Division of the 16th Air Army of the 1st Belorussian Front. He participated in the Belarusian, Vistula–Oder, Warsaw–Poznań, East Prussian and Berlin operations. He was discharged in 1945 with the rank of senior sergeant. He was awarded an order and medals.

He engaged in literary work from 1946. His first book, На первом рубеже ("At the First Frontier"), was published in 1955. He graduated from the Maxim Gorky Literature Institute in 1958 and became a member of the Union of Soviet Writers in 1957.

He was a laureate of all-union and all-Russian literary, music and television competitions as well as international competitions; awards were received for poems to songs. He was awarded the Konstantin Simonov Literary Prize in 2015 for his last few books. He won the all-union competition for best patriotic work, organised by DOSAAF, and became a diploma winner of the USSR Ministry of Defence literature prize in 1972. At many music competitions, he received awards with composers. He was the recipient of the Sergei Korolev Gold Medal for poetry about astronautics, the Pyotr Ilyich Tchaikovsky Silver Medal, laureate of the Republican Prize of the Turkmen SSR for the book Дыхание границы ("Breath of the Border") (1957).

Dubrovin died on 25 June 2020. He was buried at the Troyekurovskoye Cemetery.

== Bibliography ==
=== Popular songs based on poems by Dubrovin ===
- «Любви негромкие слова» ("Quiet Words of Love") (music by V. Shainsky) – performed by Anna German, Muslim Magomayev, Galina Ulyotova
- «Расстрелянный вагон» ("The Shot Carriage") (music by L. Lyadova) – performed by APP MVO, soloist Evgeny Ustin
- «Земляника» ("Strawberries") (song of the border guard) (music by T. Smirnova)
- «Колокольчик вековой» ("The Century Bell") (music by D. Tukhmanov) – performed by Nina Matveeva (VIA "Nadezhda"), Iosif Kobzon
- «Девочка с мальчиком» ("Girl with a Boy") (music by Y. Saulsky) – performed by Valentina Tolkunova
- «Вся жизнь в тебе» ("All life is in you") (music by M. Chuev) – performed by Gennady Belov
- «Две копейки» ("Two kopecks") (music by D. Tukhmanov) – performed by Alexander Barykin
- «Спешу» ("I am in a hurry") (music by A. Khaslavsky) – performed by VIA Здравствуй, песня ("Hello, Song")
- «Подбитая птица» ("The Padded Bird") (music by Vadim Andreev) – performed by Yan Osin
- «Карнавал» ("Carnival") (music by B. Kiselev) – performed by Tõnis Mägi
- «Маленькая Москва» ("Little Moscow") (music by A. Barykina) – performed by Alexander Barykin (group "Carnival")
- «Возвращение» ("Return") (music. O. Feltsman) – performed by Joseph Kobzon
- «Долина света» ("Valley of Light") (music. L. Quint) – performed by Olga Kormukhina
- «Я в сторонке постою» ("I'll stand aside") (music by V. Shainsky) – performed by Anne Veski
- «Офицерский марш» ("Officer March") (D. Tukhmanov) – performed by Joseph Kobzon
- «Колечко» ("Ring") (music by L. Quint) – performed by Xenia Georgiadi
- «Спасибо вам, солдаты» ("Thank you, soldiers") (music by I. Kataev) – performed by Galina Ulyotova
- «Забайкалье не забудем» ("We will not forget Transbaikalia") (music by A. Khaslavsky) – performed by Joseph Kobzon
- «В городе Ноябрьске» ("In the city of Noyabrsk") (music by O. Feltsman) – performed by Valentina Tolkunova
- «Дождь идёт» ("It is raining") (music by D. Olivieri) – performed by Maya Kristalinskaya
- «Зачем Вы лето обошли» ("Why did you bypassed the summer") (music by D. Tukhmanov) – performed by Sergey Zakharov, Joseph Kobzon
- «Всем улыбка идёт» ("Everybody's Smile Goes") (music by T. Korganova) – performed by Oleg Anofriev
- «Голос твой» ("Your voice") (music by A. Barykin) – performed by Alexander Barykin (group "Carnival")
- «Я больше не буду» ("I will not be any more") (music by V. Shainsky)
- «Царевна» ("The Princess") (music by D. Tukhmanov) – performed by Valery Yarushin and Boris Kaplun (VIA Ariel)
- «Прошёл всего лишь год» ("Only a year has passed") (music by A. Barykin) – performed by Alexander Barykin (group "Carnival")
- «Добро» ("Good") (music by M. Chuev) – performed by Gennady Belov
- «Вольному — воля» ("Freedom – will") (music. A. Khaslavsky) – performed by Nikolay Gnatyuk
- «Запомни меня» ("Remember me") (music by I. Krutoy) – performed by Laima Vaikule
- «На Дерибассовской» ("On Deribassovskaya") (music by O. Feltsman) – performed by Joseph Kobzon
- «Это ты, моя Россия» ("This is you, my Russia") (music by V. Kalistratova) – performed by Anna Litvinenko
- «Я обнимаю тебя» ("I hug you") (music by A. Barykina) – performed by Alexander Barykin (group "Carnival")
- «Балалаечник» ("Balalaika") (music by S. Tomina) – performed by Edward Gil
- «Игра в четыре руки» ("Playing with four hands") (music by D. Tukhmanov) – performed by Vadim Azarkh and Anastasia Stotskaya
- «Твой взгляд» ("Your look") (music by A. Kiselev) – performed by VIA Добры молодцы ("Good Fellows")
- «Попугай» ("Parrot") (music by A. Khaslavsky)
- «В этом доме» ("In this house") (music. A. Zubkov) – performed by Igor Ivanov
- «Осенний парк» ("Autumn Park") (music by A. Barykin) – performed by Alexander Barykin (group "Carnival")
- «Будь, женщина, уверена в себе» ("Be, a woman, confident in yourself") (music by B. Terentyev) – performed by Maya Kristalinskaya
- «Дон Жуан» ("Don Juan") (music. O. Feltsman) – performed by Viacheslav Olkhovsky
- «Там, где мы встречались» ("Where We Met") (music by B. Dubrovin) – performed by Viacheslav Olkhovsky
- «Нет, я не та» ("No, I'm not that one") (music by E. Shiryaeva) – performed by Ekaterina Shavrina
- «Песня о мире» ("Song of the World") (music by A. Barykin) – performed by Alexander Barykin (group "Carnival")
- «Мне всё напоминает о тебе» ("Everything reminds me of you") (music by V. Belyanin) – performed by duet – Margarita Suvorova and Valery Belyanin
- «Звёздный городок» ("Star City") (music by A. Flyarkovsky) – performed by Lev Leshchenko
- «От печали до радости» ("From sorrow to joy") (music by Y. Antonov) – performed by Yuri Antonov
- «Танго в дискотеке» ("Tango in a disco") (music by O. Feltsman) – performed by Valentina Tolkunova and Leonid Serebrennikov
- «Две берёзы» ("Two birches") (music by A. Khaslavsky) – performed by Galina Sheveleva and Sergey Mazaev (VIA Здравствуй, песня ("Hello, Song"))
- «Пути солдатские» ("Soldiers' Ways") (music by B. Alexandrov) – performed by Ivan Bukreev and Eduard Labkovsky
- «Ангел мой крылатый» ("My winged angel") (music by L. Quint – lyrics by F. Petrarch, trans. B. Dubrovin) – performed by Valery Leontiev
- «Броненосец „Потёмкин“» ("Battleship Potemkin") (music by D. Tukhmanov) – performed by Lev Leshchenko
- «Жить без дружбы людям невозможно» ("It is impossible for people to live without friendship") (music by V. Chernyakov) – performed by Katya Ogonyok
- «Вот и лето пришло» ("So the summer has come") (music by A. Khaslavsky) – performed by Edita Piekha
- «Это глаза твои» ("These are your eyes") (music by G. Ostrovsky) – performed by Zaur Tutov
- «Домой, домой» ("Home, home") (music by O. Feltsman) – performed by duet – Valentina Tolkunova and Leonid Serebrennikov
- «Океан» ("Ocean") (music by A. Barykin) – performed by Alexander Barykin (group "Carnival")
- «Аджимушкай» ("Adzhimushkai") (music by V. Shainsky) – performed by Sergey Zakharov
- «Совершенно секретно» ("Top secret") (music by D. Tukhmanov) – performed by VIA "Cascade"
- «Вальс для вас» ("Waltz for You") (music by M. Kazhlaev) – performed by Nani Bregvadze
- «Ухожу» ("I’m leaving") (music by A. Khaslavsky) – performed by VIA Здравствуй, песня ("Hello, Song")
- «Твоя рука» ("Your hand") (music by A. Korchinsky) – performed by Nikolay Karachentsov
- «Была любовь» ("There was love") (music by E. Ptichkina) – performed by Sergey Zakharov
- «Твоя улыбка» ("Your Smile") (music by O. Beskrovny) – performed by Aziza
- «Вся жизнь моя» ("All my life") (music by O. Feltsman) – performed by Andrey Mironov
- «Летняя гроза» ("Summer Thunderstorm") (music by V. Gordeev)
- «Жить привыкаю без тебя» ("I'm getting used to living without you") (music by S. Ukhnalyov) – performed by Oleg Ukhnalev
- «Только ты» ("Only you") (music. M. Kazhlaeva) – performed by Larisa Dolina
- «Доброта» ("Kindness") (music by V. Miguli) – performed by duet – Valentina Tolkunova and Vladimir Migulya, Olga Voronets
- «Звонок, звонок» ("Call, call") (music by A. Khaslavsky) – performed by Galina Sheveleva (VIA Здравствуй, песня ("Hello, Song"))
- «Я хочу всю жизнь начать с начала» ("I want to start all my life from the beginning") (music by O. Feltsman) – performed by Edita Piekha
- «Смешной человечек» ("Funny little man") (music by E. Schekalev) – performed by Margarita Suvorova
- «Не позабудь» ("Don't Forget") (music by A. Korchinsky)
- «Признание» ("Recognition") (music by S. Tulikov) – performed by Sergey Zakharov
- «Две звезды» ("Two Stars") (music by V. Shainsky) – performed by Vladimir Shainsky
- «Лепестки в снегу» ("Petals in the Snow") (music by A. Khaslavsky) – performed by VIA Здравствуй, песня ("Hello, Song")
- «Я серёжку потеряла» ("I lost my earring") – (music by Valery Belyanin) – performed by Irina Surina, 2011
- «Не уходи» ("Do not go away") (music by I. Krutoy) – performed by Alexander Buinov
- «Песня о Москве» ("Song of Moscow") (music by D. Tukhmanov) – performed by Galina Nenasheva
- «Колыбельная» ("Lullaby") (music. O. Feltsman) – performed by Joseph Kobzon
- «Всё жду и жду ответа» ("I'm still waiting and waiting for an answer") (music by D. Tukhmanov) – performed by Tatiana Antsiferova
- «Между прочим» ("By the way") (music by Y. Yakushev) – performed by Nikolay Karachentsov
- «Я пишу тебе каждую ночь» ("I write to you every night") – performed by Valery Belyanin (music by V. Belyanin) 1995
- «Мне все напоминает о тебе» ("Everything reminds me of you") – performed by Margarita Suvorova and Valery Belyanin (music by V. Belyanin) 1994
- «Русские» ("The Russians") (music by S. Bolotnikov and S. Volkogonov) – performed by St. Petersburg – 2
- «Гранит» ("Granite") (music by S. Vasiliev) – performed by Zemlyane
- «Клоун» ("Clown") (music by I. Romanov) – performed by Zemlyane
- «Друг другу мы необходимы» ("We are necessary for each other") (music by I. Romanov) – performed by Zemlyane
- «Путь домой» ("The Way Home") (music by V. Kiselev) – performed by Zemlyane
- «О годах забывая» ("Forgetting About the Years") (music by S. Kolmanovsky) – performed by Vladimir Troshin
- «Малиновый закат» ("Crimson Sunset") (music by T. Markov) – performed by Tatiana Markova
- «Вспоминай» ("Remember") (music by T. Markova) – performed by Tatiana Markova
- «Всё так просто» ("Everything is so simple") (music by T. Markova) – performed by Tatiana Markova
- «Ты цветы мне подари» ("Give me flowers") (music by T. Markova) – performed by Tatiana Markova
- «Там, за речкой голубою» ("There, beyond the blue river") (music by T. Markova) – performed by Tatiana Markova
- «Сирень, дурман-цветы» ("Lilac, dope-flowers") (music by T. Markova) – performed by Tatiana Markova
- «Полыхали розы» ("Roses were blazing") (music by T. Markova) – performed by Tatiana Markova
- «Вино любви» ("Wine of Love") (music by T. Markova) – performed by Tatiana Markova
- «Плакучая ива» ("Weeping Willow") (music by T. Markova) – performed by Tatiana Markova
- «Синеокая» ("Blue-eyed") (music by T. Markova) – performed by Tatiana Markova
- «Забудь» ("Forget") (music by T. Markova) – performed by Tatiana Markova
- «Неудача» ("Failure") (music by T. Markova) – performed by Tatiana Markova
- «В последний раз» ("The last time") (music by A. Ukupnik) – performed by Akim Salbiev
- «Ласточки» ("Swallows") (music by S. Tikhonov) – performed by Akim Salbiev
- «Прикосновение» ("Touch") (music by M. Poel) – performed by Akim Salbiev
- «Клёны» ("Maples") (music by M. Poel) – performed by Akim Salbiev
- «Будем вдвоём» ("Let's be together") (A. Kukharenko) – performed by Akim Salbiev
- «Коварная обманщица» ("Insidious deceiver") (music by T. Markova) – performed by Akim Salbiev
- «Рабочий квартал» ("Workers' Quarter") (music by A. Khaslavsky) – performed by Akim Salbiev
- «Поздняя весна» ("Late Spring") (music by A. Khaslavsky) – performed by Akim Salbiev
- «Вернись» ("Come back") (music by M. Poel) – performed by Akim Salbiev
- «Струны нервов» ("Strings of Nerves") (music by V. Shainsky) – performed by Akim Salbiev

=== Poetry ===
- На первом рубеже: Стихи ("At the First Frontier: Poems"). M., 1955
- Окрылённые бойцы: Книга стихов ("Inspired Fighters: A Book of Poems"). M., 1956
- Тревожная группа: Лирика ("Disturbing Group: Lyrics"). M., 1957
- Ветер мужества: Стихи ("Wind of Courage: Poems"). M., 1962
- Дыхание границы: Стихи и поэма ("Breath of the Boundary: Poems and Poem"). Ashgabat, 1962
- Провожает Земля: Лирика ("Seeing off the Earth: Lyrics"). M., 1962
- Сердца, неведомые миру: Стихи ("Hearts Unknown to the World: Poems"). M., 1964
- Слова негромкие любви: Стихи ("Quiet Words of Love: Poems"). M., 1965 (Poetic Russia)
- Четвёртая жизнь: Стихи ("Fourth Life: Poems"). M., 1965 (Library of the magazine Советский воин ("Soviet Warrior"))
- Лирика ("Lyrics"). Kazan, 1966
- Океанская земля: Лирика ("Ocean Land: Lyrics"). M., 1966
- Когда не могут без тебя: Книга стихов ("When They Can't Live Without You: A Book of Poems"). M., 1969
- Русские самоцветы: Стихи ("Russian Gems: Poems"). M., 1969
- Всего лишь день: Лирика ("Just a Day: Lyrics"). M., 1970
- Скрытая нежность: Стихи ("Latent Tenderness: Poems"). M., 1970
- Наперекор разлуке: Стихи ("In Spite of Separation: Poems"). Baku, 1973
- Никогда, никогда не расставаться: Стихи ("Never, Never Part: Poems"). M., 1974 (Library of the magazine Пограничник ("Border Guard"))
- Разлуки и встречи: Стихи ("Parting and Meeting: Poems"). M., 1976
- Самое дорогое: Стихи ("Most Precious: Poems"). M., 1979
- Запомни: Стихи ("Remember: Poems"). M., 1982 (novelties Современника ("Contemporary"))

=== Prose ===
- Цветение: Документальная повесть ("Blossom: A Documentary Tale"). M., 1961
- Конец безмолвию: Повесть ("The End of Silence"): A Tale. M., 1962
- Почему в Кара-Кумы?: Повесть ("Why Kara-Kumy?: A Tale"). M., 1963
- Стой, мгновенье (Рассказы); Счастье первой тропы: Повесть ("Wait a Moment (Stories); The Happiness of the First Path: A Tale"). M., 1964
- Позывные, летящие в ночь: Рассказы ("Call Signs Flying Into the Night: Stories"). M., 1965 (Прочти, товарищ! ("Read it, Comrade!)")
- О годах забывая: Повести ("Forgetting About the Years: Tales"). M., 1973
