= Vesyolye Rebyata =

VIA band from Moscow, Russia

Vesyolye Rebyata Весёлые Ребята
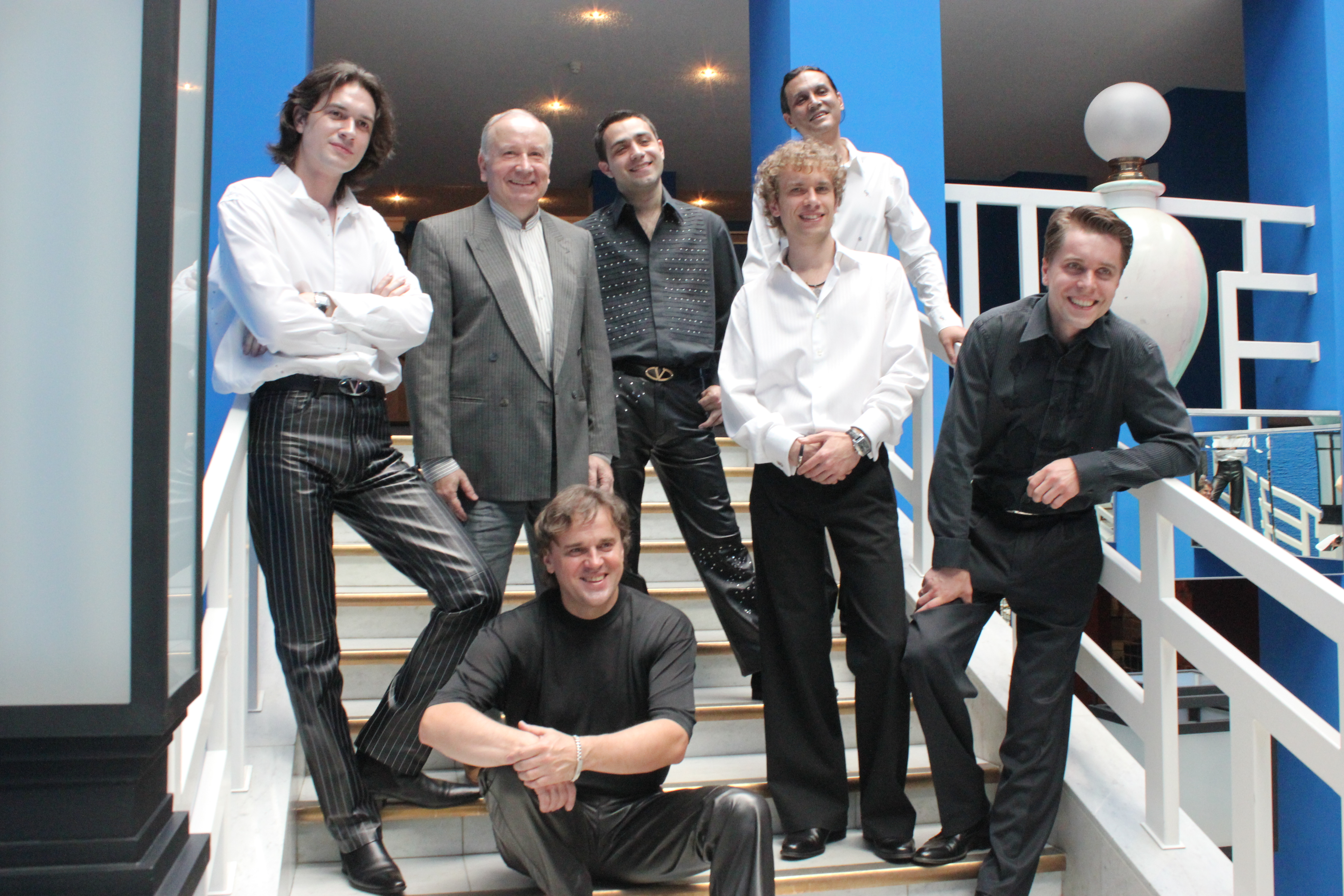
- Vesyolye Rebyata in 2011

Background information
- Origin: Moscow, Russian SFSR, Soviet Union
- Genres: Commonly: Beat (early), traditional pop, hard rock, art rock, pop rock, soft rock, new wave (mid 80s); Occasionally: folk rock/folk, country rock/country
- Years active: 1968–1992, 2005–2017
- Labels: Melody, Balkanton, Bomba Music
- Members: Pavel Slobodkin
- Past members: Anatoly Alyoshin, Jury Andreev, Alexander Barykin, Lyudmila Barykina, Leonid Berger, Nina Brodskaja, Alexander Buinov, Alexey Glyzin, Alexander Gradsky, Alexander Dobronravov, Alexander Dobrynin, Alexander Lerman, Alexey Puzyryov, Igor Gataullin, Vyacheslav Malezhik, Robert Mushkambarjan, Alla Pugachyova, Svetlana Rezanova, Vladimir Fazylov, Viktor Chaika, Jury Chernavsky

Vesyolye Rebyata (Russian: Весёлые Ребята, "Merry Lads") was a Soviet VIA (vocal instrumental ensemble) band formed in 1968, in Moscow. It became one of the most successful and best known VIA bands of all time. Its debut album sold 15,795,000 copies and its membership included at various times such popular Soviet era singers as Alla Pugachova, Alexander Gradsky, and Alexander Barykin. As of 2006, the band had sold a record-shattering 179,850,000 records.

== History ==
Vesyolye Rebyata was a band founded in 1968 by the Soviet pianist and composer Pavel Slobodkin.

In 1970, the Soviet recording company Melodia (Melody) released the band's first record. In 1971, Vesyolye Rebyata gave a series of concerts in Czechoslovakia, performing in the concert hall Lucerne in Prague. In 1973, the band recorded one of the best known albums, "Love - a huge country" (Russian: Любовь — огромная страна). In 1980, the band released a new LP titled "We should be friends" (Russian: Дружить нам надо) and took part in the cultural component of the 1980 Olympic Games in Moscow. In 1983, the band recorded a new album titled "Banana islands" (Russian: Банановые острова). In 1987, a new album titled Minutochku (Russian: Минуточку!) was released.

In 2005, the band is reconstituted with new membership. In 2007, the band released two CDs: "Love - child of the planet" (Russian: Любовь-дитя планеты) and "When we are quiet together" (Russian: Когда молчим вдвоём). In 2011, the band released a new album with the French title "Cherchez la...". In 2012, the band released its ninth album titled "Write me a letter" (Russian: Напиши мне письмо).

In August 2017, Pavel Slobodkin had died and the group was disbanded.
