= VIA (music) =

Classification of music in the Soviet Union

VIA (Russian: ВИА) is an abbreviation for vocal and instrumental ensemble (Вокально-инструментальный ансамбль, Vokalno-instrumentalny ansambl). It is the general name used for popular music (pop, rock, folk, etc.) bands that were formally recognized by the Soviet government from the 1960s to the 1980s.

In Soviet times, the term VIA generally meant 'band', but it is now used in Russia to refer specifically to pop, rock, and folk groups active during the Soviet period.

With the dissolution of the Soviet Union the term gradually went out of use.

In Yugoslavia, the abbreviation VIS (Serbo-Croatian Cyrillic: ВИС), meaning vokalno-instrumentalni sastav (вокално-инструментални састав), was used in the same context.

== History ==
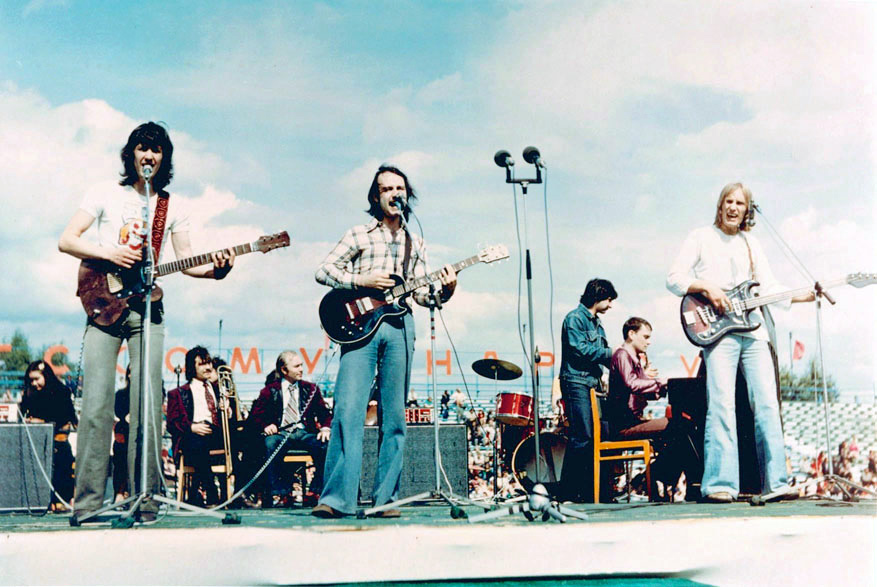
A typical 1970s Soviet VIA Tsvety, in the hippie-inspired dress of the era

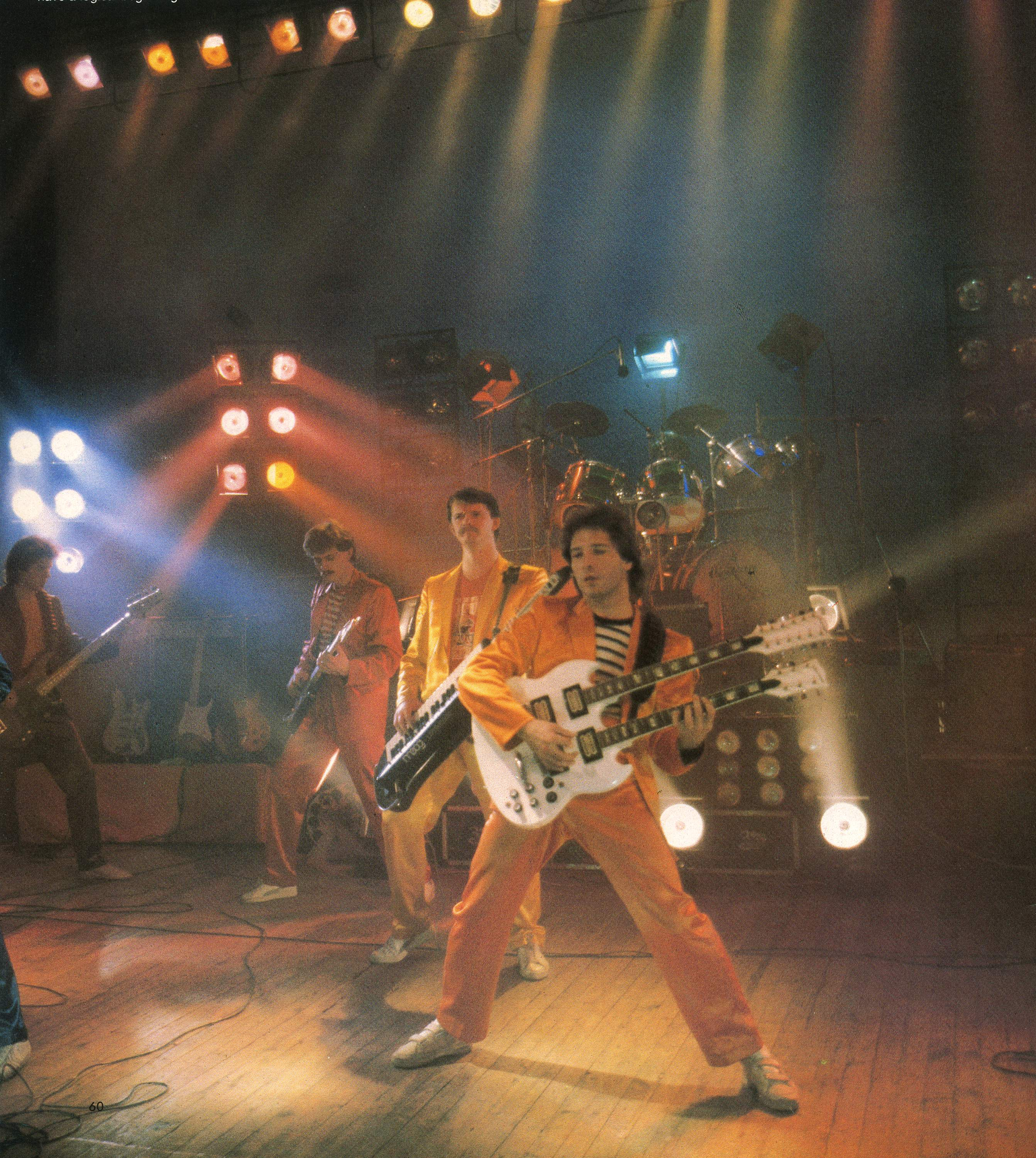
VIA Zemlyane, c. 1984

The term VIA appeared in the Soviet Union in the 1960s and represented a model under which the Soviet government was willing to permit domestic rock and pop music acts to develop. To break through to the state-owned Soviet media, a band needed to become an officially recognized VIA. Each VIA had an artistic director (художественный руководитель) who served as manager, producer, and state-appointed censor. In some bands (such as Pesniary) the artistic director was the band's leading member and songwriter, while in others he played the role of impresario.

Soviet VIAs played a specific style of pop music. They performed youth-oriented (but officially approved) radio-friendly music, which combined contemporary Western and Soviet trends. Folk instruments were often used, and occasionally a keytar (a keyboard held like a guitar). Songs varied from pop ballads, dance-beat disco and new wave to mainstream rock. Many VIAs had up to ten members (including a number of vocalists and multi-instrumentalists), who were in frequent rotation.

Due to state censorship, the lyrics of VIAs were family-friendly; typical topics were universal emotions like love, joy, and nostalgia, or idealized vignettes from daily life. Many bands also encouraged national culture and patriotism, (especially those of national minorities from the smaller Soviet republics) such as Yalla from Uzbekistan, Labyrinth from Georgia and Chervona Ruta from Ukraine. Folk-based VIAs such as Pesniary (later they mixed folk rock and progressive rock styles), Siabry and Verasy were especially popular in Belarus. Russian bands from Moscow and Leningrad (such as Zemlyane and Tsvety) were more oriented towards Western pop and rock music.

Many VIAs were created by musicians that played together in local choruses or musical theatrical productions. The earliest VIAs included Avangard (Avantgarde) in 1964, Poyushchiye Gitary (The Singing Guitars) in 1966, Vesyolye Rebyata (Jolly Fellows) in 1968, and Dobry Molodtsy (Note: Dobry Molodtsy (Добры молодцы) is literally translated as "good guys", but it is an archaic expression meaning "brave, strong lads" now seen mostly in bylinas and fairy tales in reference to heroes) in 1969.

== Bands ==
Notable Soviet VIAs include:

- Ariel, Russia
- Chervona Ruta, Ukraine
- Dos Mukasan, Kazakhstan
- Ensemble "Grenada", Russia; international and political songs
- Iveria, Georgia
- Kaskad, Afghanistan/Russia
- Leysya, Pesnya, Russia
- Noroc, Moldova
- Pesniary, Belarus
- Plamya, Russia
- Poyushchiye Gitary ("Singing Guitars"), Russia
- Rostov, Russia
- Samotsvety ("Gems"), Russia
- Syabry, Belarus
- Tsvety ("Flowers"), Russia
- Verasy, Belarus
- Vesyolye Rebyata ("Jolly Fellows"), Russia
- Yalla, Uzbekistan, signature hit: "Uchquduq"
- Zemlyane ("Earthlings"), Russia, signature hit: "Grass by the Home"

== See also ==
- Big-beat (Eastern Bloc)
- Soviet bards, unofficial, underground musical culture in Soviet Union
