= One to One! =

Russian television series

- Russian: Один в один!
- Genre: Reality competition
- Directed by: Sergey Shesteperov
- Presented by: Alexander Oleshko (1, 5); Nonna Grishaeva (1); Igor Vernik (2―5); Yulia Kovalchuk (2―4); Nikolay Baskov (6); Klava Koka (6)
- Judges: Gennady Khazanov (1); Lyubov Kazarnovskaya (1); Alexander Revva (1); Lyudmila Artemyeva (1, 3―4); Yury Stoyanov (2―6); Olga Borodina (2); Alexey Chumakov (2, 6); Maksim Galkin (2―3); Hibla Gerzmava (3); Tigran Keosayan (4); Larisa Dolina (4); Marina Fedunkiv (5); Timur Rodriguez (5); Marina Meshcheryakova (5-6)
- Country of origin: Russia
- Original language: Russian
- No. of series: 6
- No. of episodes: 64

Production
- Producer: Timur Weinstein
- Production location: Moscow
- Camera setup: Multiple camera
- Running time: 120 mins. (inc. adverts)
- Production company: WeiT Media

Original release
- Network: Channel One Russia (2013); Rossiya 1 (2014-2016, 2019, 2025)
- Release: 3 March 2013

Related
- Toch-v-Toch; Your Face Sounds Familiar

One to One! (Russian: Один в один!, romanized: Odin v odin!) is a Russian talent show based on the Spanish series Your Face Sounds Familiar. The show involves celebrities (actors, television personalities, comedians) portraying various iconic singers each week. It is produced by the company WeiT Media.

== Format ==
Ten famous singers took part in the first four seasons of the show (in the fourth season, the number of main participants was reduced to 9, and an invited ex-participant of the project acted as the tenth contestant). In each issue, they had to transform into music stars, trying to adopt the original style of the artist, from appearance and manner of movement to the timbre of the voice. The jury, consisting of four people, evaluates what they see at the end of each issue according to a system similar to the distribution of points at the Eurovision Song Contest: each member of the jury gives points from 2 to the most disliked performance to 10 to the second place; the best performance, according to a jury member, receives a score of 12 (there is no score of 11). After the jury's ratings are announced, each participant chooses one opponent to whom he wants to award an additional 5 points. The reasons may be different: participants can choose the opponent whose performance they liked the most, or support the opponent who performed poorly, or did not receive enough points from the jury members. At the end of each issue, the participants will find out who they will have to portray next time.

The points scored by the participants accumulate, and as a result, the five participants with the highest number of points (in season 4 - all 9) go to the finals, where the winner of the season is determined by live audience voting. Unlike the "qualifying" editions, in the final, the participants themselves choose the star they will transform into. It can be any celebrity that this participant did not show on the project. From the first to the second season, the finale was broadcast live. The viewers themselves determined the winner of the project by SMS voting during the broadcast of the final. Also in season 1, the exact number of people who voted for the winner was shown. In season 2, a photo of the winner of the project was shown on the big screen. Since season 3, the finale has been recorded, but viewers still had the right to determine the winner by SMS voting - from Sunday to Wednesday (in season 3, the hosts opened 4 envelopes with participants who took fifth, fourth, third places and the name of the winner, and in season 4, when determining the winner, they took into account also, the points scored by the participants for all issues). In season 4, the broadcast was again recorded; this time, from 9th to 3rd places, the names of the participants who took them were shown on the screen, and the 3rd place and the name of the winner, as in the previous season, were opened in an envelope.

The fifth season was attended not by stars, but by ordinary people (with the exception of individual pop artists such as Anton Zatsepin, Yuri Titov, Andrey Barinov and Alexander Ozerov). The season was attended by 8 people, there was no interview with the co-host. Each participant has his own mentor — an ex-participant of the project, who chooses the image of the artist being shown using a button, after which he looks for a ward for this role among the "willing". The grading remains the same as in previous seasons, except that the jury scores not from 2, but from 4 to 12. Those who will receive 5 points were coordinated by the participants and mentors with each other. The winner of the issue automatically became a finalist for the project, while still having the right to choose the image for the finale himself. The season finale was recorded; instead of SMS voting, the winner was determined by the audience in the studio by voting with a button on the remote control.

There are two presenters in the project, one leads the show and introduces the participants, and his co-host (co-host) interviews them before going on stage. During the interview, they show footage from vocal and acting rehearsals.

== Main Judges and presenter ==
=== Main Judges timeline ===
Timeline of Main Judges
Main Judges	Seasons						
Main Judges	1	2	3	4	5	6	7
Gennady Khazanov							
Lyubov Kazarnovskaya							
Alexander Revva							
Lyudmila Artemyeva							
Maksim Galkin							
Olga Borodina							
Alexey Chumakov							
Yury Stoyanov							
Hibla Gerzmava							
Larisa Dolina							
Tigran Keosayan							
Marina Fedunkiv							
Timur Rodriguez							
Marina Meshcheryakova							
Invited Judge							

Timeline of presenter
Presenter	Seasons						
Presenter	1	2	3	4	5	6	7
Alexander Oleshko							
Nonna Grishaeva							
Igor Vernik							
Yulia Kovalchuk							
Nikolay Baskov							
Klava Koka							

Presenter

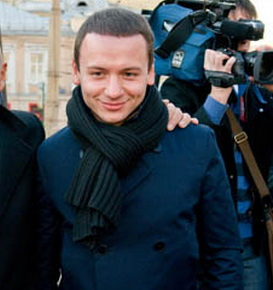
Alexander Oleshko (1, 5)

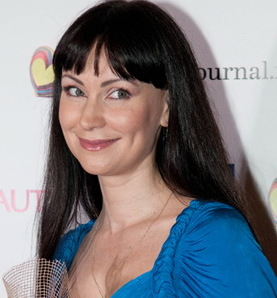
Nonna Grishaeva (1)

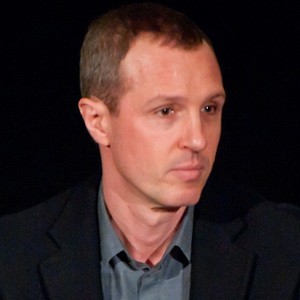
Igor Vernik (2―5)

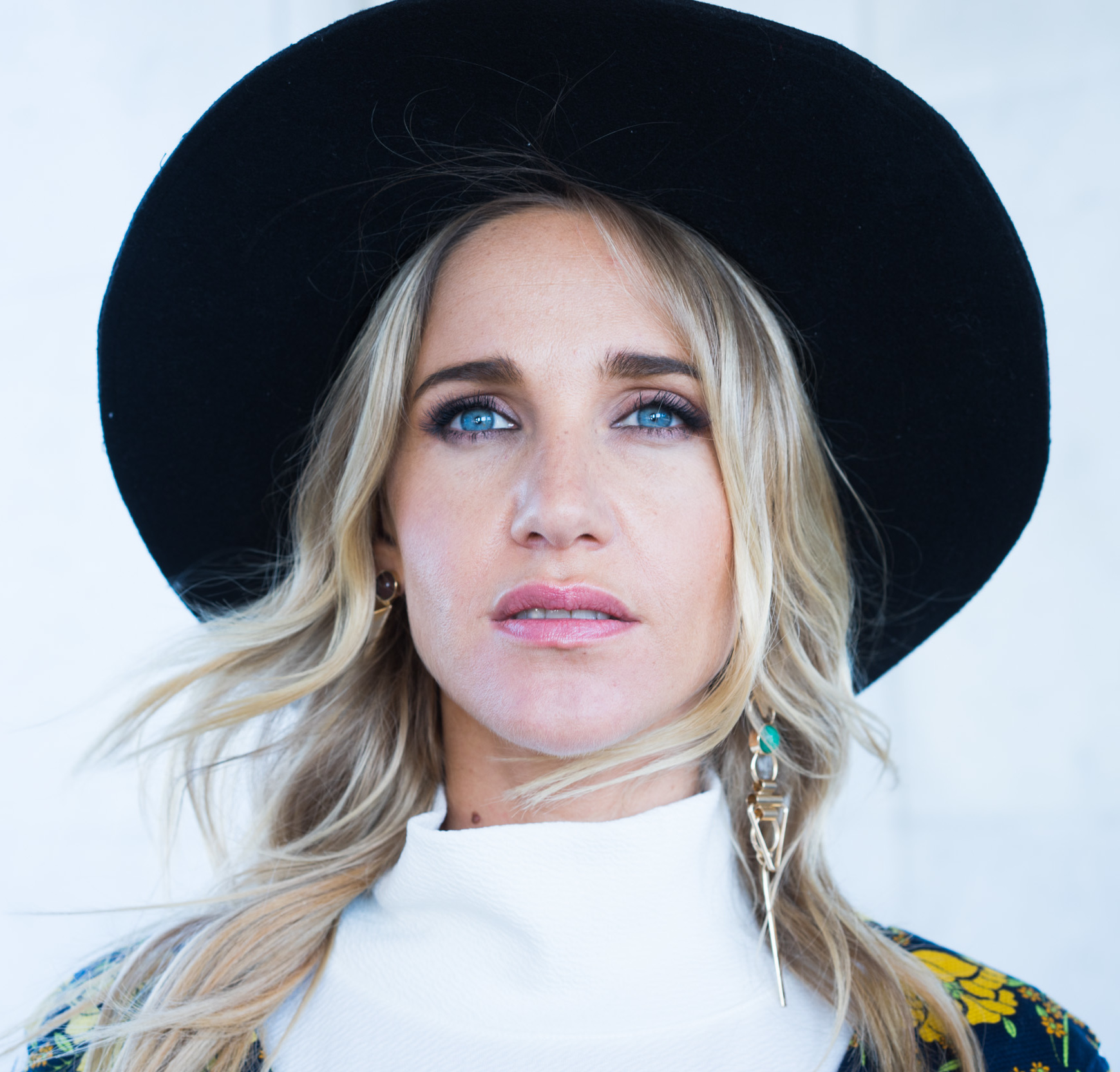
Yulia Kovalchuk (2―4)

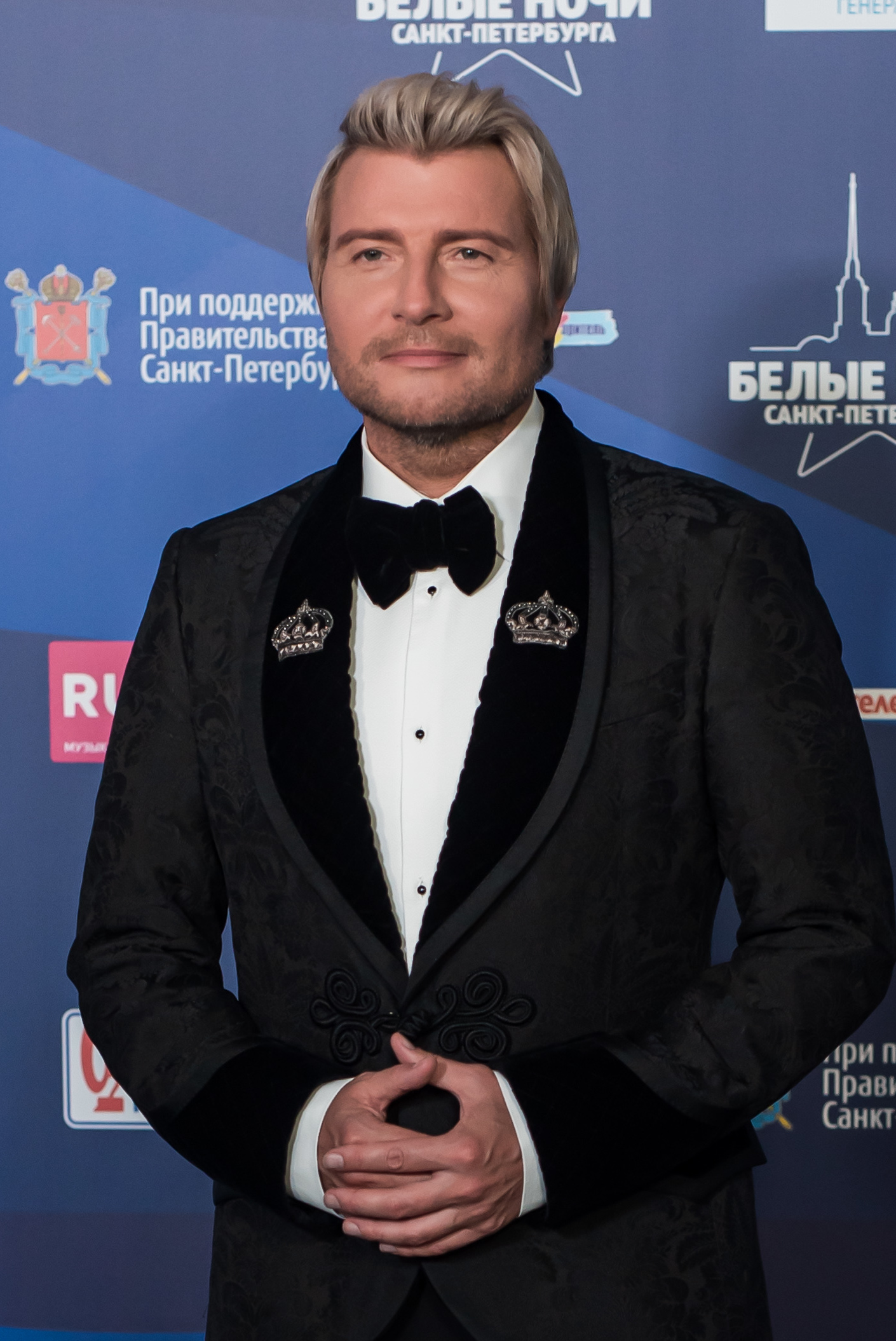
Nikolay Baskov (6-)

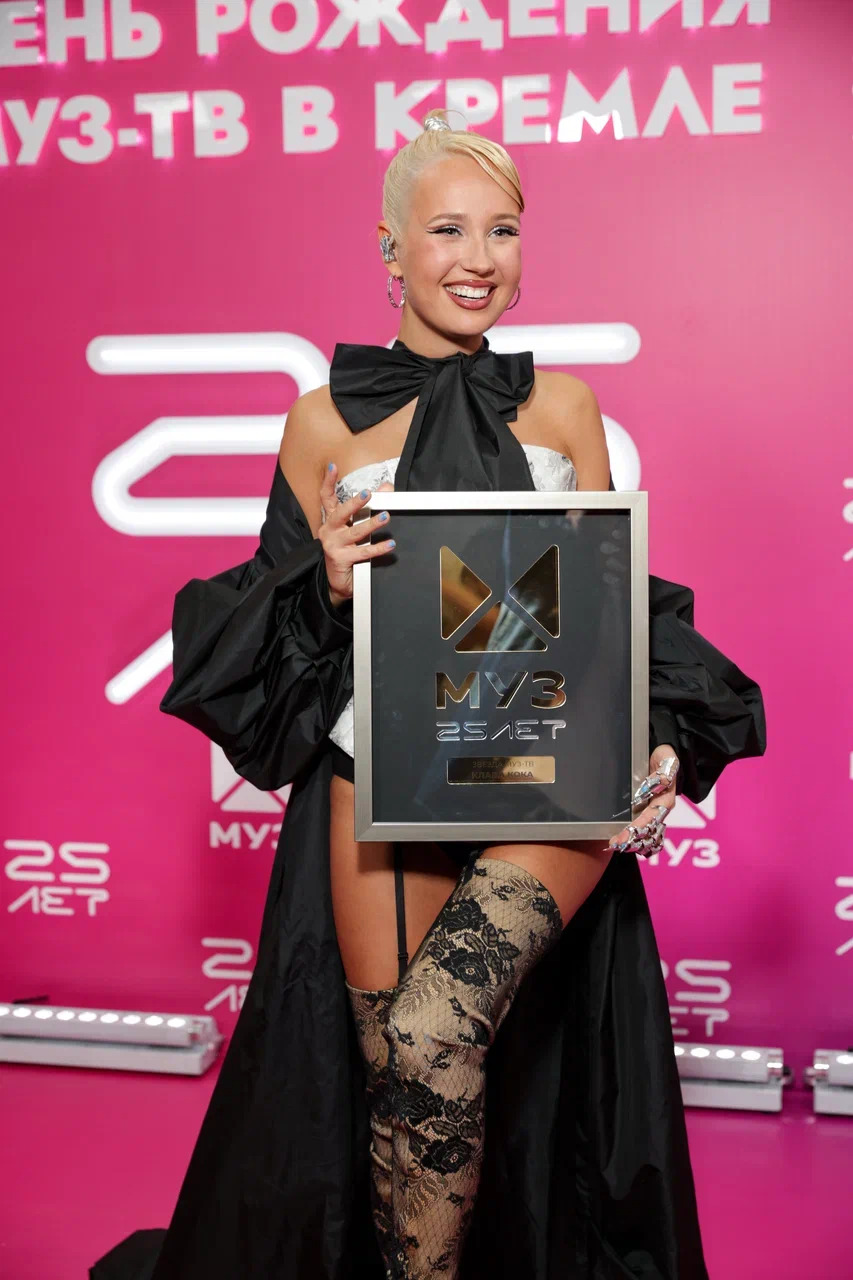
Klava Koka (6-)

== Series overview ==
Season	Year	Winner		Runner-up	Third place	Presenters		Main judges (chair's order)			
Season	Year	Winner		Runner-up	Third place	Presenters		1	2	3	4
1	2013	Alexey Chumakov		Yulia Savicheva	Timur Rodriguez	Alexander Oleshko	Nonna Grishaeva	Gennady Khazanov	Lyubov Kazarnovskaya	Alexander Revva	Lyudmila Artemyeva
2	2014	Vitaly Gogunsky		Vadim Kazachenko	Yulia Parshuta	Igor Vernik	Yulia Kovalchuk	Maksim Galkin	Olga Borodina	Alexey Chumakov	Yury Stoyanov
3	2015	Ruslan Alekhno	Batyrkhan Shukenov (Note: Batyrkhan Shukenov was declared the winner posthumously.)	Alexander Rybak	Svetlana Svetikova	Igor Vernik	Yulia Kovalchuk	Yury Stoyanov	Hibla Gerzmava	Maksim Galkin	Lyudmila Artemyeva
4	2016	Alexey Chumakov		Ruslan Alekhno	Yulia Parshuta	Igor Vernik	Yulia Kovalchuk	Yury Stoyanov	Larisa Dolina	Tigran Keosayan	Lyudmila Artemyeva
5	2019	Pavel Kryukov		Veronika Mokhireva	Armen Khachaturyan	Igor Vernik	Alexander Oleshko	Yury Stoyanov	Marina Fedunkiv	Timur Rodriguez	Marina Meshcheryakova
6	2025	Mariya Zaytseva		Vyacheslav Makarov	Alisa Mon	Nikolay Baskov	Klava Koka	Invited Judges (Note: Season 6: Episode 1 - Lyudmila Artemyeva Episode 2 - Valeriya Episode 3 - Sergey Lazarev Episode 4 - Natasha Korolyova Episode 5 - Ekaterina Ivanchikova Episode 6 - Igor Sarukhanov Episode 7 - Igor Nikolaev Episode 8 - Larisa Dolina Episode 9 - Alexander Buinov Episode 10 - Filipp Kirkorov)	Yury Stoyanov	Alexey Chumakov	Marina Meshcheryakova
7	2027					Nikolay Baskov	Klava Koka	Invited Judges	Yury Stoyanov	Alexey Chumakov	Marina Meshcheryakova

== Seasons ==
Highest scoring performance
Lowest scoring performance
Qualified for the final
Didn't qualify for the final

=== Season 1 (2013) ===
The following chart contains the names of the iconic singers that the celebrities imitated every week.

Celebrity	Week 1	Week 2	Week 3	Week 4	Week 5	Week 6	Week 7	Week 8	Week 9	Week 10	Week 11	Points	Week 12 – Final	Place
Alexey Chumakov	Ilya Lagutenko	Alexander Serov	Lyubov Uspenskaya	Stevie Wonder	Boris Moiseev	Justin Timberlake	Montserrat Caballe	Valery Leontiev	Leonid Utyosov	Avraam Russo	Sting	500	Filipp Kirkorov	1st
Yulia Savicheva	Whitney Houston	Kylie Minogue	Nadezhda Kadysheva	Stas Mikhaylov	Zhanna Aguzarova	Celine Dion	Alla Pugacheva	Freddie Mercury	Masha Rasputina	Glyuk'oZa	Zemfira	414	Lyudmila Gurchenko	2nd
Timur Rodriguez	Michael Jackson	Mick Jagger	Leonid Agutin	Lyudmila Gurchenko	James Brown	Sergey Penkin	Sergey Mazaev	Nyusha	Adriano Celentano	Jay Kay	Ray Charles	454	Eros Ramazzotti & Cher	3rd
Anita Tsoy	Tina Turner	Timati	Beyonce	Lyubov Kazarnovskaya	Lady Gaga	Edith Piaf	Alla Pugacheva	Diana Ross	Viktor Tsoy	Shakira	Tamara Gverdtsiteli	393	Georg Ots (Note: Mister X, «Mister Iks»)	4th
Anastasia Stotskaya	Lolita	Lyudmila Zykina	Liza Minnelli	Britney Spears	Filipp Kirkorov	Valeriya	Pink	Larisa Dolina	Yolka	Svyatoslav Vakarchuk	Anna German	347	Alla Pugacheva	5th
Eva Polna	Edita Piekha	Madonna	Valery Meladze	Marlene Dietrich	Elena Vaenga	Diana Arbenina	Bogdan Titomir	Cesária Évora	Irina Allegrova	Mikhail Shufutinsky	Jennifer Lopez	298	Mayte Mateos	6th
Sergey Penkin	Grigory Leps	Vladimir Presnyakov	Louis Armstrong	Lev Leshchenko	Demis Roussos	Klavdiya Shulzhenko	Nikolay Baskov	Alexander Gradsky	Elvis Presley	Elton John	Anne Veski	292	Thomas Anders	7th
Sati Kazanova	Marilyn Monroe	Anzhelika Varum	Nani Bregvadze	Rihanna	Laima Vaikule	Dima Bilan	Barbra Streisand	Kristina Orbakaite	Sofia Rotaru	Valentina Tolkunova	PSY	273	María Mendiola	8th
Alexey Kortnev	Iosif Kobzon	Ella Fitzgerald	Boris Grebenshchikov	Igor Nikolaev	Seal	Garik Sukachov	George Michael	Yury Antonov	Lidia Ruslanova	Andrey Mironov	Sergey Shnurov	257	Dieter Bohlen	9th
Evgeny Kungurov	Dmitry Khvorostovsky	Eduard Khil	Alexander Buinov	Sergey Zhukov	Nadezhda Babkina	Muslim Magomaev	Alexander Rosenbaum	Frank Sinatra	Seryoga	Fyodor Shalyapin	Joe Dassin	226	Andrea Bocelli	10th

=== Season 2 (2014) ===
The following chart contains the names of the iconic singers that the celebrities imitated every week.

Celebrity	Week 1	Week 2	Week 3	Week 4	Week 5	Week 6	Week 7	Week 8	Week 9	Week 10	Week 11	Week 12	Week 13 (Note: Special episode dedicated to Children's Day, no ratings)	Week 14	Points	Week 15 - Final	Place
Vitaly Gogunsky	Valery Meladze	Adriano Celentano	Shura	Freddie Mercury	Tina Turner	Alexander Serov	Ricky Martin	Vadim Kazachenko	Alsou	Mark Bernes	Maxim Galkin	Klaus Meine	Grigory Leps (Note: With Milana Gogunskaya ― Ani Lorak)	Afric Simone	468	Vladimir Vysotsky	1st
Vadim Kazachenko	Louis Armstrong	Garik Sukachov	Igor Talkov	Sofia Rotaru	Andrey Gubin	Julio Iglesias	Seryoga	Yury Antonov	Filipp Kirkorov	Lolita	Paul McCartney	Mikhail Shufutinsky	Garik Sukachov (Note: With Georgy Gegiya ― Garik Sukachov)	Riccardo Fogli	461	Nikolay Karachentsov	2nd
Yulia Parshuta	Nadezhda Kadysheva	Madonna	Zemfira	Rihanna	Denis Klyaver	Lyubov Uspenskaya	Dalida	Ella Fitzgerald	Filipp Kirkorov	Keti Topuria	Klavdiya Shulzhenko	Gloria Gaynor	Zemfira (Note: With Ekaterina Bizina ― Zemfira)	Liz Mitchell	430	Alla Pugacheva	3rd
Yulia Nachalova	Mariah Carey & Whitney Houston	Yury Shatunov	Adele	Alla Pugacheva	Zhanna Aguzarova	Lyudmila Zykina	Bob Marley	Christina Aguilera	Larisa Dolina	Nani Bregvadze	Elton John	Irina Ponarovskaya	Alla Pugacheva (Note: With Vera Aldonina ― Kristina Orbakaite)	Thomas Anders	433	Celine Dion	4th
Teona Dolnikova	Yolka	Beyonce	Tamara Gverdtsiteli	Irina Allegrova	Polina Gagarina	Roman Bilyk	Olga Kormukhina	Maya Kristalinskaya	Lady Gaga	Loreen	Amy Winehouse	Igor Kornelyuk	Lyudmila Zykina (Note: With Sofya Fisenko ― Lyudmila Zykina)	Nyusha	440	Marilyn Monroe	5th
Alyona Sviridova	P!nk	Lyubov Orlova	Vladimir Kuzmin	Edith Piaf	Natalya Vetlitskaya	Diana Arbenina	Anna German	Andrey Makarevich	Raffaella Carra	Laima Vaikule	Barbra Streisand	Detsl	Nastya Kamenskykh (Note: With Grigory Sviridov ― Potap)	Sandra	407	Alexander Bard	6th
Denis Klyaver	Steven Tyler	Vladimir Presnyakov	Mikhail Boyarsky	Tarkan	Elvis Presley	Anzhelika Varum	Viktor Tsoy	Joe Cocker	Filipp Kirkorov	Nikolay Noskov	Iosif Kobzon	Slava	Enrique Iglesias (Note: With Irina Zastrogina ― Whitney Houston)	Batyrkhan Shukenov	388	Grigory Leps	7th
Irakly Pirtskhalava	Stas Mikhaylov	Ilya Lagutenko	Shakira	Soso Pavliashvili	Lev Leshchenko	Ray Charles	Leonid Agutin	Alyona Apina	Nikolay Rastorguev	Jon Bon Jovi	Basta	James Brown	Justin Timberlake (Note: With Egor Klinaev ― Justin Timberlake)	Igor Sarukhanov	387	Timati	8th
Dmitry Bikbaev	Muslim Magomaev	Natasha Korolyova	Michael Jackson	Vitas	Grigory Leps	Sergey Zhukov	Cher	Nikolay Baskov	Georg Ots	Dima Bilan	Vera Brezhneva	Ivan Dorn	Al Bano (Note: With Anna Bugakova ― Romina Power)	Sergey Zverev	380	Jean-Pierre Barda	9th
Nadezhda Granovskaya	Masha Rasputina	Mireille Mathieu	Elena Vaenga	Valery Leontiev	Montserrat Caballe	Lyudmila Gurchenko	Nadezhda Babkina	Patricia Kaas	Liza Minnelli	Boris Moiseev	Bonnie Tyler	Alyona Sviridova	Montserrat Caballe (Note: With Timofey Sushin ― Freddie Mercury)	In-Grid	358	La Camilla	10th

=== Season 3 (2015) ===
- On 29 April Batyrkhan Shukenov died after having a heart attack. Until his death the season had finished twelve of its fifteen episodes. The recordings of the last episodes continued but without Shukenov. Before he died he was on the third position in the ranking. The broadcast of 17 May, which was recorded before Shukenov's death, was won by Shukenov and he was named finalist there. The episode which was broadcast before that episode, on 10 May, didn't feature Shukenov because the recordings of this episode were planned on the 30th of April, one day after Shukenov's death. In the end of semi-final episode Shukenov was named the one of two winners of the season posthumously. During the final episode all (including former) participants, judges and presenters paid a tribute to him.
- Although the official rules only allow five finalists; Alexander Rybak was named as sixth finalist during the semi-final, after Maxim Galkin stated that the judges wanted him to be in the final. At the end of the show Rybak finished as runner up.

The following chart contains the names of the iconic singers that the celebrities imitated every week.

Celebrity	Week 1	Week 2	Week 3	Week 4	Week 5	Week 6	Week 7	Week 8	Week 9	Week 10	Week 11	Week 12	Week 13 (Note: Special episode dedicated to Victory Day, no ratings)	Week 14	Points	Week 15 - Final	Place
Ruslan Alekhno	Pharrell Williams	Oleg Gazmanov	Alexander Rybak	Anna Netrebko & Filipp Kirkorov	Alexey Chumakov	Jon Bon Jovi	Nicolas Reyes	Katya Lel	Andrey Mironov (Note: Ostap Bender, «The Twelve Chairs»)	Soso Pavliashvili	Jaak Joala	Adriano Celentano	Yury Gulyaev	Alexander Serov	476	Evgeny Martynov	1st
Batyrkhan Shukenov†	Louis Armstrong	Luciano Pavarotti	Yury Antonov	Leonid Agutin	Cesária Évora	Murat Nasyrov	Vladimir Shakhrin	Kola Beldy	Nikolay Rybnikov (Note: Sasha Savchenko, «Spring on Zarechnaya Street»)	Vladimir Kuzmin	Liz Mitchell	Tõnis Mägi	(Note: Batyrkhan Shukenov was supposed to appear in the image of Mark Bernes)	Stevie Wonder	438	(Note: According to Mark Tishman, Shukenov was supposed to present the image of Grigory Leps in the final)	1st
Alexander Rybak	Elvis Presley	Dima Bilan	Eduard Khil	Enrique Iglesias	Gloria Gaynor	Shura	Alexander Losev	Andrea Bocelli	Yuri Nikulin (Note: Semyon Semyonovich Gorbunkov, «The Diamond Arm»)	Lyudmila Ryumina	Chris de Burgh	Rod Stewart	Nikolay Kryuchkov (Note: Vasily Bulochkin, «Heavenly Slug»)	Conchita Wurst	411	Michael Buble	2nd
Svetlana Svetikova	Jennifer Lopez	Evgeny Osin	Ekaterina Ivanchikova	Kylie Minogue	Keti Topuria	Lara Fabian	Olga Seryabkina	Björk	Audrey Hepburn (Note: Holly Golightly, «Breakfast at Tiffany's»)	Valeriya	Prins	Tatyana Shmyga (Note: Eliza Doolittle, «My Fair Lady» (Moscow Operetta Theatre))	Larisa Golubkina	Madonna	430	Lady Gaga	3rd
Angelica Agurbash	Olga Kormukhina	Valentina Tolkunova	Masha Rasputina	Beyonce	Alla Pugacheva	Stas Piekha	Dani Klein	Anastacia	Ekaterina Savinova (Note: Frosya Burlakova, «Come Tomorrow, Please...»)	Irina Allegrova	Elena Kamburova	Garik Sukachov	Klavdiya Shulzhenko	Anna German	439	Lolita	4th
Marina Kravets	Anzhelika Varum	Zemfira	Shakira	Valery Leontiev	Christina Aguilera	Lidia Ruslanova	Dolores O'Riordan	Eva Polna	Barbara Brylska (Note: Nadya Shevelyova, vocal — Alla Pugacheva, «The Irony of Fate, or Enjoy Your Bath!»)	Rihanna	Edith Piaf	Aya	Nina Urgant (Note: Raisa, «Belorussian Station»)	Aida Vedishcheva	416	Toni Braxton	5th
Nikita Malinin	Sergey Zhukov	Britney Spears	Charles Aznavour	Sergey Lazarev	Alessandro Safina	George Michael	Marie Fredriksson	Valery Syutkin	Dmitry Kharatyan (Note: Aleksey Korsak, «Gardes-Marines, Ahead!»)	Alexander Malinin	Zhenya Belousov	Lenny Kravitz	Oleg Dal	Sting	366	Jean Patrick Baptiste	6th
Mark Tishman	Vladimir Markin	Sergey Chelobanov	Robbie Williams	Vladimir Presnyakov	Dmitry Khvorostovsky	Glyuk'oZa	Vyacheslav Butusov	Frank Sinatra	Nikita Mikhalkov (Note: Kolya, «Walking the Streets of Moscow»)	Joe Dassin	Vlad Stashevsky	Nani Bregvadze	Yaroslav Evdokimov	Yury Shatunov	337	Eros Ramazzotti	7th
Shura	Nikolay Slichenko	Tom Jones	Irina Zabiyaka	Viktor Saltykov	Toto Cutugno	Sergey Krylov	Igor Ivanov	Mikhail Muromov	Atamansha (Note: vocal — Oleg Anofriev, «The Bremen Town Musicians»)	Arkady Ukupnik	Vyacheslav Dobrynin	Igor Sarukhanov	Vladimir Troshin	Viktor Rybin	301	Rina Zelyonaya (Note: Tortila the Turtle, «The Adventures of Buratino»)	8th
Evelina Blyodans	Elena Vaenga	Marilyn Monroe	Mitya Fomin	Natasha Korolyova	Ekaterina Shavrina	Tamara Gverdtsiteli	Irina Nelson	Andrey Derzhavin	Marina Ladynina (Note: Galina Peresvetova, «Cossacks of the Kuban»)	Natalia Oreiro	Linda	Tatyana Bulanova	Irina Muravyova	Lyudmila Gurchenko	275	Annette Eltice	9th

=== Season 4, The Best (2016) ===
In this season participated nine contestants from the past seasons. Moreover, one extra contestant (also from the past seasons) was in each new release.

The following chart contains the names of the iconic singers whom the celebrities imitated every week.

Celebrity	Week 1 (Note: No ratings)	Week 2	Week 3	Week 4	Week 5	Week 6	Week 7	Week 8	Week 9	Week 10	Week 11	Week 12	Week 13	Points	Week 14 (Note: Special episode dedicated to Eurovision, no ratings)	Week 15 - Final	Place
Alexey Chumakov	Vakhtang Kikabidze	Zhenya Belousov	Sergey Trofimov	Lyubov Uspenskaya	Anna German	Youssou N'Dour & Neneh Cherry	George Michael	Vadim Kazachenko	Boka	Frank Sinatra	Luis Miguel	Sergey Penkin	Nikolay Noskov	518	(Note: Alexey Chumakov couldn't take part in the episode due to illness)	Tina Turner	1st
Ruslan Alekhno	Valery Kipelov	Andrea Bocelli	Valery Leontiev	Andrey Mironov	Zhanna Aguzarova	Stevie Wonder	Muslim Magomaev	Steven Tyler	Josh Groban	Nikolay Karachentsov (Note: Marquis of Ricardo, «The Dog in the Manger»)	Eduard Khil	Tarkan	James Brown & Luciano Pavarotti	488	Dima Bilan	Faina Ranevskaya (Note: The taper, «Alexander Parkhomenko»)	2nd
Yulia Parshuta	Adele	P!nk	Bianka	Zemfira	Valery Meladze	Tamara Miansarova	Eminem & Rihanna	Marie Fredriksson	Lolita	Natalya Seleznyova (Note: Zinaida Timofeeva, vocal ― Nina Brodskaya, «Ivan Vasilievich Changes Profession»)	Valeriya	Sergey Lemokh	Shiara	475	Marija Šerifović	Miley Cyrus	3rd
Vitaly Gogunsky	Joe Dassin	Boris Moiseev	Irina Allegrova	Freddie Mercury	Sarah Brightman	Iosif Kobzon	Antonio Banderas (Note: El Mariachi, «Desperado»)	Roman Pashkov	(Note: Vitaly Gogunsky was supposed to take part in the image of the singer Seal, but due to illness he could not take part in the release. Nevertheless, in order not to exclude Vitaly from the standings of the issue, each of the jury members gave him 2 points)	Mikhail Boyarsky (Note: Chevalier de Brillieu, «Gardes-Marines, Ahead!»)	Masha Rasputina	Soso Pavliashvili	Joey Tempest	293	Måns Zelmerlöw	Nikolay Rastorguev	4th
Sergey Penkin	Georg Ots	Alla Bayanova	Valery Obodzinsky	Nikolay Baskov	Edita Piekha	Luciano Pavarotti	Ilya Lagutenko	Tõnis Mägi	Vyacheslav Dobrynin	Alexander Borisov (Note: Alexander Lapin, «True Friends»)	Karel Gott	Alessandro Safina	Nikolay Slichenko	247	Toto Cutugno	Sergey Drozdov	5th
Vadim Kazachenko	Sergey Shnurov	Egor Kreed	Bryan Adams	Igor Talkov	Taisia Povaliy	Eros Ramazzotti	Timati	Herwig Rüdisser	Larisa Dolina	Leonid Kuravlyov (Note: George Miloslavsky, vocal ― Valery Zolotukhin, «Ivan Vasilievich Changes Profession»)	Vladimir Mulyavin	Enrique Iglesias	Chris Rea	334	Engelbert Humperdinck	Frank Sinatra	6th
Anastasia Stotskaya	Elena Vaenga	Rihanna	Sofia Rotaru	Liza Minnelli	Shura	Diana Arbenina	Kristina Orbakaite	Ekaterina Ivanchikova	Grigory Leps	Natalya Andreychenko (Note: Mary Poppins, vocal ― Tatyana Voronina, «Mary Poppins, Goodbye»)	Tamara Gverdtsiteli	Aretha Franklin	Izabella Yurieva	399	Ruslana	Irina Otieva	7th
Angelica Agurbash	Cher	Willi Tokarev	Irina Ponarovskaya	Alla Pugacheva	Alexander Ivanov	Raffaella Carrà	Lidia Ruslanova	Mariska Veres	Lady Gaga	Alisa Freindlich (Note: Anne of Austria, «D'Artagnan and Three Musketeers»)	Bonnie Tyler	Lyudmila Gurchenko	Vladimir Presnyakov	470	Helena Paparizou	Dalida	8th
Svetlana Svetikova	Beyonce	Roza Rymbaeva	Leonid Agutin	Björk	Robertino Loretti	Amy Winehouse	Celine Dion	Yulia Volkova	Britney Spears	Natalya Varley (Note: Nina, vocal ― Aida Vedishcheva, «Kidnapping, Caucasian Style»)	Edith Piaf	Vanessa Paradis	Maria Kallas	313	Loreen	Sheryl Crow	9th
Extra contestants		Yulia Nachalova	Mark Tishman	Sati Kazanova	Nadezhda Granovskaya	Evelina Blyodans	Teona Dolnikova	Nikita Malinin	Denis Klyaver	Shura	Irakly Pirtskhalava	Milana Gogunskaya	Dmitry Bikbaev	226	Nikita Malinin		
Extra contestants		Whitney Houston	Joe Cocker	Dima Bilan	Salvatore Adamo	Anna Semenovich	Sia	Oleg Yakovlev	Lenny Kravitz	Baba Yaga (Note: «The Flying Ship»)	Dave Gahan	Marilyn Monroe	Alekseev	226	Sergey Lazarev		

=== Season 5 (2019) ===
In the fifth season, eight ordinary people took part. Each participant has his coach, who chooses the image of the shown artist. The winner of the episode was automatically a finalist of the project.

The following chart contains the names of the iconic singers that the celebrities imitated every week.

Coach	Week 1	Week 2	Week 3	Week 4	Week 5	Week 6 - Final	%
Yulia Nachalova	Asya Pushkina - Elena Vaenga	Georgy Ivashchenko - Alla Pugacheva	Slavvo Tsarsky - Valery Meladze	Tatyana Skaredneva - Alexander Gradsky	Pavel Kryukov - Joe Cocker	Pavel Kryukov - Grigory Leps	21% (1st)
Anastasia Stotskaya	Alexey Gerashchenko - Ray Charles	Igor Korri - Seryoga	Inga Ilyushina - Anna German	Olga Shitova - Zemfira	Veronika Mokhireva - Lady Gaga	Veronika Mokhireva - Aida Vedishcheva	19% (2nd)
Irakly Pirtskhalava	Igor Portnoy - Tom Jones	Andrey Barinov - Leonid Agutin	Mariam Andreevskaya - Amy Winehouse	Armen Khachaturyan - Alexey Chumakov	Sergey Smolin - Roman Bilyk	Armen Khachaturyan - Igor Talkov	17% (3rd)
Irakly Pirtskhalava	Igor Portnoy - Tom Jones	Andrey Barinov - Leonid Agutin	Mariam Andreevskaya - Amy Winehouse	Armen Khachaturyan - Alexey Chumakov	Sergey Smolin - Roman Bilyk	Andrey Barinov - Tina Turner	14% (5th)
Irakly Pirtskhalava	Igor Portnoy - Tom Jones	Andrey Barinov - Leonid Agutin	Mariam Andreevskaya - Amy Winehouse	Armen Khachaturyan - Alexey Chumakov	Sergey Smolin - Roman Bilyk	Mariam Andreevskaya - Natalya Vetlitskaya	13% (6th)
Vitaly Gogunsky	Yan Osin - Iosif Kobzon	Elina Chaga - LOBODA	Irida Khusainova - Anzhelika Varum	Maria Koltsova - Britney Spears	Roman Parmonov - Vakhtang Kikabidze	Yan Osin - Ricky Martin	16% (4th)
Angelica Agurbash	Andrey Solod - Patricia Kaas	Mari Karne - Lyudmila Zykina	Dmitry Galikhin - Fyodor Shalyapin	Bogdan Shuvalov - Cher	Angelina Sergeeva - Marie Fredriksson		
Evelina Blyodans	Anton Zatsepin - Oleg Gazmanov	Roman Isaev - Alexander Serov	Yury Titov - Laima Vaikule	Sergey Arutyunov - Klaus Meine	Elena Charkviani - Nadezhda Babkina		
Vadim Kazachenko	Ekaterina Rostovtseva - Sofia Rotaru	Viktoria Kaunova - Celine Dion	German Gusev - Igor Kornelyuk	Eva Vlasova - Tamara Gverdtsiteli	Olesya Lavrentyeva - Zhanna Aguzarova		
Sergey Penkin	Yuliya Lebeda - Adele	Alexander Ozerov - Alexander Rosenbaum	Irina Olifer - Ella Fitzgerald	Avraam Karakhan - Farrukh Zokirov	Roman Kormakov - Valery Obodzinsky		

=== Season 6 (2025) ===
The following chart contains the names of the iconic singers that the celebrities imitated every week.

Celebrity	Week 1	Week 2	Week 3	Week 4	Week 5	Week 6	Week 7	Week 8	Week 9	Week 10 - Final	Points	Place
Mariya Zaytseva	Tina Turner	Yolka	Shura	LP	Toni Braxton	Lady Gaga	Elvis Presley	Celine Dion (Note: «Titanic»)	Annie Lennox	Cher & Eros Ramazzotti	361	1st
Vyacheslav Makarov	Mika	Kay Metov	Sergey Lazarev	Darren Hayes	Yaroslav Evdokimov	Anastacia	Robbie Williams	Ewan McGregor (Note: Christian, «Moulin Rouge!») & Jacek Koman (Note: The Unconscious Argentinean, «Moulin Rouge!»)	Thomas Anders	Michael Jackson	330	2nd
Alisa Mon	Sabrina	Klavdiya Shulzhenko	Lusya Chebotina	Edita Piekha	Garik Sukachov	Lyudmila Gurchenko	Lidia Ruslanova	Yanina Zhejmo (Note: Cinderella, vocal — Lyubov Chernina, «Cinderella»)	Elena Vaenga	Édith Piaf	310	3rd
Zhan Milimerov	Stevie Wonder	Nicolas Reyes	Alexander Serov	Nadezhda Kadysheva	Mikhail Shufutinsky	Igor Sarukhanov	The Weeknd	Mithun Chakraborty (Note: Jimmy, «Disco Dancer»)	Alexander Shoua	Batyrkhan Shukenov	303	4th
Arseny Borodin	Jon Bon Jovi	Irina Zabiyaka	Sergey Zhukov	Michael Bublé	Lenny Kravitz	Valery Leontiev	Igor Nikolaev	Mikhail Boyarsky (Note: D'Artagnan, «D'Artagnan and Three Musketeers»)	Soso Pavliashvili	Nikolay Noskov	291	5th
Nodar Reviya	Jony	Pharrell Williams	Alexey Chumakov	Dima Bilan	Ekaterina Ivanchikova	George Michael	Stas Mikhaylov	Andrey Mironov	Alexander Ivanov	Filipp Kirkorov	291	5th
Nadezhda Angarskaya	Masha Rasputina	Zhanna Aguzarova	Adele	Nikolay Baskov	Nadezhda Babkina	Anna Semenovich	Cesária Évora	Svetlana Svetlichnaya (Note: Anna Sergeevna, vocal — Aida Vedishcheva, «The Diamond Arm»)	Aretha Franklin (Note: Mrs. Murphy, «The Blues Brothers».)	Montserrat Caballé	265	6th
Valeriya Lanskaya	Zivert	Tamara Gverdtsiteli	Liza Minnelli	Natasha Korolyova	Elena Kamburova	Ella Fitzgerald	Klava Koka	Natalya Guseva (Note: Alisa Seleznyova, vocal — Tatyana Daskovskaya, «Guest from the Future»)	Madonna	Anzhelika Varum	248	7th
Yulia Savicheva	Diana Arbenina	Avril Lavigne	Mylène Farmer	P!nk	Amy Winehouse	Andrey Gubin	Elena Obraztsova	Irina Muravyova (Note: Nina Solomatina, vocal — Zhanna Rozhdestvenskaya, «Carnival»)	Lyubov Uspenskaya	Lyudmila Zykina	239	8th
Rodion Gazmanov	Valeriy Syutkin	Bryan Adams	Rod Stewart	Sergey Trofimov	Sergey Shnurov	Kostya Grim	Tom Jones	Yuri Nikulin (Note: Fool, «Kidnapping, Caucasian Style»)	Alexander Buinov	Vladimir Presnyakov	206	9th

== See also ==
- Toch-v-Toch
