= Odin v odin! season 3 =

Odin v odin!
- Season 3
- No. of episodes: 15

Release
- Original network: Rossiya 1
- Original release: 8 February – 24 May 2015

Season chronology
- ← Previous; 2 Next → 4

Season three of Odin v odin! premiered on February 8, 2015.

== Celebrities ==
Celebrity	Occupation	Result
Evelina Bledans	Actress	9th place
Shura	Singer	8th place
Mark Tishman	Singer	7th place
Nikita Malinin	Singer	6th place
Marina Kravets	Comedian	5th place
Angelica Agurbash	Singer	4th place
Svetlana Svetikova	Singer	Third place
Alexander Rybak	Singer	Runner up
Batyrkhan Shukenov	Singer	Winner
Ruslan Alekhno	Singer	Winner

== Imitations chart ==
Highest scoring performance
Lowest scoring performance
Qualified for the final
Didn't qualify for the final

- On 29 April Batyrkhan Shukenov died after having a heart attack. Until his death the season had finished twelve of its fifteen episodes. The recordings of the last episodes continued but without Shukenov. Before he died he was on the third position in the ranking. The broadcast of 17 May, which was recorded before Shukenov's death, was won by Shukenov and he was named finalist there. The episode which was broadcast before that episode, on 10 May, didn't feature Shukenov because the recordings of this episode were planned on the 30th of April, one day after Shukenov's death. In the end of semi-final episode Shukenov was named the one of two winners of the season posthumously. During the final episode all (including former) participants, judges and presenters paid a tribute to him.
- Although the official rules only allow five finalists; Alexander Rybak was named as sixth finalist during the semi-final, after Maxim Galkin stated that the judges wanted him to be in the final. At the end of the show Rybak finished as runner up.

The following chart contains the names of the iconic singers that the celebrities imitated every week.

Celebrity	Week 1	Week 2	Week 3	Week 4	Week 5	Week 6	Week 7	Week 8	Week 9	Week 10	Week 11	Week 12	Week 13 (Note: Special episode dedicated to Victory Day, no ratings.)	Week 14	Points	Week 15 - Final	Place
Ruslan Alekhno	Pharrell Williams	Oleg Gazmanov	Alexander Rybak	Anna Netrebko & Philipp Kirkorov	Alexey Chumakov	Jon Bon Jovi	Nicolas Reyes	Katya Lel	Andrei Mironov (Note: Ostap Bender, «The Twelve Chairs».)	Soso Pavliashvili	Jaak Joala	Adriano Celentano	Yuri Gulyayev	Aleksander Serov	476	Eugene Martynov	1st
Batyrkhan Shukenov†	Louis Armstrong	Luciano Pavarotti	Yuri Antonov	Leonid Agutin	Cesária Évora	Murat Nasyrov	Vladimir Shakhrin	Kola Beldy	Nikolai Rybnikov (Note: Sasha Savchenko, «Spring on Zarechnaya Street».)	Vladimir Kuzmin	Liz Mitchell	Tõnis Mägi	(Note: Batyrkhan Shukenov was supposed to appear in the image of Mark Bernes.)	Stevie Wonder	438	(Note: According to Mark Tishman, Shukenov was supposed to present the image of Grigory Leps in the final.)	1st
Alexander Rybak	Elvis Presley	Dima Bilan	Eduard Khil	Enrique Iglesias	Gloria Gaynor	Shura	Alexander Losev	Andrea Bocelli	Yuri Nikulin (Note: Semyon Semyonovich Gorbunkov, «The Diamond Arm».)	Lyudmila Ryumina	Chris de Burgh	Rod Stewart	Nikolai Kryuchkov	Conchita Wurst	411	Michael Buble	2nd
Svetlana Svetikova	Jennifer Lopez	Evgeny Osin	Ekaterina Ivanchikova	Kylie Minogue	Keti Topuria	Lara Fabian	Olga Seryabkina	Björk	Audrey Hepburn (Note: Holly Golightly, «Breakfast at Tiffany's».)	Valeriya	Prins	Tatyana Shmyga	Larisa Golubkina	Madonna	430	Lady Gaga	3rd
Angelica Agurbash	Olga Kormukhina	Valentina Tolkunova	Masha Rasputina	Beyonce	Alla Pugacheva	Stas Piekha	Dani Klein	Anastacia	Ekaterina Savinova (Note: Frosya Burlakova, «Come Tomorrow, Please...».)	Irina Allegrova	Elena Kamburova	Garik Sukachov	Klavdiya Shulzhenko	Anna German	439	Lolita	4th
Marina Kravets	Anzhelika Varum	Zemfira	Shakira	Valery Leontiev	Christina Aguilera	Lidia Ruslanova	Dolores O'Riordan	Eva Polna	Barbara Brylska (Note: Nadya Sheveleva, «The Irony of Fate, or Enjoy Your Bath!».)	Rihanna	Edith Piaf	Aya	Nina Urgant	Aida Vedishcheva	416	Toni Braxton	5th
Nikita Malinin	Sergey Zhukov	Britney Spears	Charles Aznavour	Sergey Lazarev	Alessandro Safina	George Michael	Marie Fredriksson	Valeriy Syutkin	Dmitry Kharatyan (Note: Aleksei Korsak, «Gardes-Marines, Ahead!».)	Alexander Malinin	Zhenya Belousov	Lenny Kravitz	Oleg Dal	Sting	366	Jean Patrick Baptiste	6th
Mark Tishman	Vladimir Markin	Sergey Chelobanov	Robbie Williams	Vladimir Presnyakov	Dmitri Hvorostovsky	Glukoza	Vyacheslav Butusov	Frank Sinatra	Nikita Mikhalkov (Note: Kolya, «Walking the Streets of Moscow».)	Joe Dassin	Vlad Stashevsky	Nani Bregvadze	Yaroslav Yevdokimov	Yuri Shatunov	337	Eros Ramazzotti	7th
Shura	Nikolai Slichenko	Tom Jones	Irina Zabiyaka	Viktor Saltykov	Toto Cutugno	Sergey Krylov	Igor Ivanov	Mikhail Muromov	Oleg Anofriev (Note: Atamansha, «The Bremen Town Musicians».)	Arkady Ukupnik	Vyacheslav Dobrynin	Igor Sarukhanov	Vladimir Troshin	Viktor Rybin	301	Rina Zelyonaya (Note: Tortila the Turtle, «The Adventures of Buratino (1975 film)».)	8th
Evelina Bledans	Elena Vaenga	Marilyn Monroe	Mitya Fomin	Natasha Korolyova	Ekaterina Shavrina	Tamara Gverdtsiteli	Irina Nelson	Andrey Derzhavin	Marina Ladynina (Note: Galina Peresvetova, «Cossacks of the Kuban».)	Natalia Oreiro	Linda	Tatyana Bulanova	Irina Muravyova	Lyudmila Gurchenko	275	Annette Eltice	9th

== Top 3 Best results ==
Celebrity	Best results					
Celebrity	Best	Points	2 place	Points	3 place	Points
Ruslan Alekhno	Nicolas Reyes	66	Andrei Mironov (Note: Ostap Bender, «The Twelve Chairs».)	60	Anna Netrebko and Philipp Kirkorov	47
Batyrkhan Shukenov	Cesaria Evora	69	Stevie Wonder	51	Vladimir Shakhrin	42
Alexander Rybak	Lyudmila Ryumina	48	Andrea Bocelli	46	Dima Bilan	43
Svetlana Svetikova	Lara Fabian	68	Björk	54	Madonna	46
Angelica Agurbash	Elena Kamburova	61	Valentina Tolkunova	45	Ekaterina Savinova (Note: Frosya Burlakova, «Come Tomorrow, Please...».)	44
Marina Kravets	Zemfira	53	Aida Vedishcheva	46	Eva Polna	43
Nikita Malinin	Charles Aznavour	77	Lenny Kravitz	45	Sting	40
Mark Tishman	Nikita Mikhalkov (Note: Kolya, «Walking the Streets of Moscow».)	43	Joe Dassin	40	Sergei Chelobanov	39
Shura	Oleg Anofriev (Note: Atamansha, «The Bremen Town Musicians».)	52	Vyacheslav Dobrynin	31	Viktor Saltykov	29
Evelina Bledans	Tamara Gverdtsiteli	34	Natasha Korolyova	29	Irene Nelson	29

Highest scoring performance
Lowest scoring performance
