= The Invisible Man (game show) =

Russian entertainment show

- Genre: Entertainment show
- Created by: Mikhail Krikunenko Olga Volodina Elena Kotunova
- Presented by: Evelina Bledans
- Theme music composer: Georgy Lebedev
- Country of origin: Russia
- Original language: Russian
- No. of seasons: 15
- No. of episodes: 150

Production
- Executive producer: Olga Volodina Elena Kotunova Mikhail Krikunenko
- Producer: Gennady Podborodnikov
- Production location: Moscow
- Camera setup: Multi-camera
- Running time: 48 minutes
- Production companies: AVK Production, Pan-Ars

Original release
- Network: TV-3
- Release: 8 February 2013 – present

The Invisible Man (Russian: Человек-невидимка) is a television entertainment show of Russian origin aired on TV-3 channel. The show's format is created by Mikhail Krikunenko, Olga Volodina, and Elena Kotunova. The television show is co-produced by AVK Production and Pan-Ars.

The show premiered on 8 February 2013, and has aired with Evelina Bledans as its host until now. This weekly show airs each Friday evening at 7:00 P.M.

The international distributor for the show is Dori Media Group.

== Format ==
Experts strive to identify each episode's celebrity guest whom they cannot see or communicate with. Unlike the experts, the viewers know the celebrity's name from the start of each episode.

Six experts represent sciences and paranormal fields. These experts are a forensic scientist, psychologist, shaman, fortuneteller, magician, and palm reader. They stay and work in a TV studio.

The experts try to identify the celebrity's features, character, occupation and even his name. Since the experts cannot see or communicate with the celebrity, they must use their unique skills and general knowledge to identify him or her. They examine materials received from the celebrity: hair, nail pieces, photos of palm lines, scent examples, teeth marks, fingerprints, blood and saliva samples, drawings, completed psychological tests, and dreams.

This show is structured as three phases and a closing round.

== The show’s slogan ==
You will have enough time to think how well you do know yourself!

== Show rounds and rules ==
Throughout each episode, the celebrity and his/her support team of friends and relatives stay offstage in two separate studious. They watch everything going on via monitors and can comment on anything at any time.

In the first round, each expert describes the celebrity's appearance: gender, age, height, figure, and hair and eye color. The experts receive the materials they need for their descriptions in advance, so they can study them on their own before studio shooting.

In the second round, each expert works with materials and data he receives in the studio; and has just two minutes to make his conclusions.

In this round the experts reveal the celebrity's secrets, especially about his/her health and life. The experts also talk about the celebrity's character, hidden inclinations and vices. They talk about the guest's past, his present unrealized talents, and future.

In the third round, the experts receive photos of eleven different celebrities who are similar to the guest plus one of the celebrity. Each expert has one minute to choose and show his choice of the celebrity's photo.

In the closing round, the celebrity appears in front of the experts, enabling them to clarify any controversial and outstanding points.

== The Expert Panel ==
Viktor Kolkutin, Doctor of Medical Science, professor, forensic scientist

Maria Pugacheva, psychologist

Dardo Kusto, shaman

Aida Martirosyan, fortuneteller

Roman Fad, magician and medium

Boris Akimov, palm reader

== Season overview ==
Release number	Season 1	Season 2	Season 3	Season 4	Season 5	Season 6	Season 7	Season 8	Season 9	Season 10	Season 11	Season 12	Season 13	Season 14	Season 15
1	Nikita Dzhigurda	Alexander Peskov	Nikolay Valuev	Kirill Kozakov	Alexander Revva	Mikhail Galustyan	Ekaterina Varnava	Masha Rasputina	Aziza	Olga Shelest	Sergey Pakhomov	Irina Bezrukova	Dariya Voskoboeva †	Ekaterina Skulkina	Olga Buzova2
2	Larisa Dolina	Masha Malinovskaya	Irina Khakamada	Natalya Bestemyanova	Kostya Tszyu	Maksim Vitorgan	Fatima Khadueva	Kirill Safonov	Irina Saltykova	Dmitry Maryanov†	Alyona Vodonaeva	Prokhor Chaliapin	Dmitry Khrustalyov	Olga Orlova 2	DAVA
3	Alexey Panin	Alexander Buinov	Vyacheslav Malafeev	Lolita	Anastasia Volochkova	Anastasia Stotskaya	Angelica Agurbash	Olga Buzova	Viktor Saltykov	Avraam Russo	Lena Lenina	Yana Troyanova	Roman Popov	Marina Fedunkiv	Tatyana Vasilyeva
4	Stanislav Sadalskiy	Alika Smekhova	Darya Dontsova	Anzhelika Varum	Pavel Derevyanko	Mitya Fomin	Vera Sotnikova	Linda	Roman Zhukov	Artyom Mikhalkov	Alexander Nosik	Ilya Safronov	Natali	Tutta Larsen	Vlad Topalov
5	Lera Kudryavtseva	Emmanuil Vitorgan	Victoria Lopyreva	Maria Butyrskaya	Yana Poplavskaya	Tatiana Volosozhar	Mikhail Politseymako	Ekaterina Volkova	Margarita Suhankina	Olga Orlova	Anastasiya Makeyeva	Darya Pynzar	Natalya Andrejchenko	Dana Borisova 2	Lyusya Chebotina
6	Jasmin	Natasha Koroleva	Alyona Sviridova	Igor Nikolaev	Egor Konchalovsky	Anatoly Wasserman	Rosa Syabitova	Valery Garkalin	Arkady Ukupnik	Vladimir Lyovkin	Alexey Vorobyov	Timur Rodriguez	Victor Vasilyev	Vlad Topalov	
7	Boris Moiseev	Alexey Yagudin	Sergey Penkin	Victor Drobysh	Olga Budina	Anastasia Zavorotnyuk	Alexander Inshakov	Tatiana Vedeneyeva	N/A	Elena Valyushkina	Viktor Loginov	Dominic Joker	Svetlana Kamynina	Marina Anisina	
8	Anfisa Chekhova	Shura	N/A	Dmitry Malikov	Vyacheslav Razbegaev	Valery Nikolaev	Zhanna Epple	Svetlana Permyakova	N/A	Glukoza	Yulia Nachalova †	Lyubov Tolkalina	Olga Dibtseva	Yana Koshkina	
9	N/A	Alla Dovlatova	N/A	Natalia Gulkina	Maksim Dunayevsky	Olga Prokofieva	Boris Grachevsky †	Vladimir Dolinsky	N/A	Viktor Rybin	Alisa Grebenshchikova	Nikita Presnyakov	N/A	Sergey Mayorov	N/A
10	N/A	Tatiana Bulanova	N/A	Edgard Zapashny	Natalya Seleznyova	Alyona Apina	Tatyana Lyutaeva	Katya Lel	N/A	Tatyana Kravchenko	Yulia Volkova	Pavel Trubiner	N/A	Vladimir Epifantsev	N/A
11	N/A	Andrey Sokolov	N/A	Nikas Safronov	N/A	N/A	N/A	N/A	N/A	Margarita Drobiazko	Vadim Kazachenko	Aristarkh Venes	N/A	Lolita 2	N/A
12	N/A	Bari Alibasov	N/A	Dana Borisova	N/A	N/A	N/A	N/A	N/A	Soso Pavliashvili	Sergey Mazaev	Diana Shurygina	N/A	Evelina Bledans	N/A
13	N/A	N/A	N/A	N/A	N/A	N/A	N/A	N/A	N/A	Irina Pegova	Yuliya Samoylova	Vitaly Gogunsky	N/A	N/A	N/A
14	N/A	N/A	N/A	N/A	N/A	N/A	N/A	N/A	N/A	Alexander Litvin	Tatiana Larina	Olga Mashnaya	N/A	N/A	N/A
15	N/A	N/A	N/A	N/A	N/A	N/A	N/A	N/A	N/A	N/A	N/A	Darya Moroz	N/A	N/A	N/A
16	N/A	N/A	N/A	N/A	N/A	N/A	N/A	N/A	N/A	N/A	N/A	Nicole Kuznetsova	N/A	N/A	N/A

== Episode list ==
Legend

— The expert correctly identified the hero of the program, choosing in the third round of his photo

— The expert incorrectly identified the hero of the program, choosing in the third round photo of another famous person

Episode list of the program "The Invisible Man"
Season	Name of the guest	Experts					
Season	Name of the guest	Maria Pugacheva	Boris Akimov	Roman Fad	Aida	Dardo Kusto	Victor Kolkutin
Season 1	Nikita Dzhigurda						
Season 1	Larisa Dolina						
Season 1	Alexey Panin						
Season 1	Stanislav Sadalsky						
Season 1	Lera Kudryavtseva						
Season 1	Jasmin						
Season 1	Boris Moiseev						
Season 1	Anfisa Chekhova						
Season 2	Alexander Peskov						
Season 2	Marsha Malinovskaya						
Season 2	Alexander Buinov						
Season 2	Alika Smekhova						
Season 2	Emmanuil Vitorgan						
Season 2	Natasha Koroleva						
Season 2	Alexey Yagudin						
Season 2	Alexander Medvedev (Shura)						
Season 2	Alla Dovlatova						
Season 2	Tatiana Bulanova						
Season 2	Andrey Sokolov						
Season 2	Bari Alibasov						
Season 3	Nikolay Valuev						
Season 3	Irina Khakamada						
Season 3	Vyacheslav Malafeev						
Season 3	Daria Dontsova						
Season 3	Victoria Lopyreva						
Season 3	Alyona Sviridova						
Season 3	Sergey Penkin						
Season 4	Kirill Kozakov						
Season 4	Natalya Besremyanova						
Season 4	Lolita Milyavskaya						
Season 4	Anzhelika Varum						
Season 4	Maria Butyrskaya						
Season 4	Igor Nikolaev						
Season 4	Victor Drobysh						
Season 4	Dmitry Malikov						
Season 4	Natalia Gulkina						
Season 4	Edgard Zapashny						
Season 4	Nikas Safronov						
Season 4	Dana Borisova						
Season 5	Alexander Revva						
Season 5	Kostya Tszyu						
Season 5	Anastasia Volochkova						
Season 5	Patel Derevyanko						
Season 5	Yana Poplavskaya						
Season 5	Yegor Konchalovsky						
Season 5	Olga Budina						
Season 5	Vyacheslav Razbegaev						
Season 5	Maksim Dunayevsky						
Season 5	Natalya Seleznyova						
Season 6	Mikhail Galustyan						
Season 6	Maksim Vitorgan						
Season 6	Anastasia Stotskaya						
Season 6	Mitya Fomin						
Season 6	Tatiana Volosozhar						
Season 6	Anatoly Wasserman						
Season 6	Anastasia Zavorotnyuk						
Season 6	Valery Nikolaev						
Season 6	Olga Prokofieva						
Season 6	Alyuna Apina						
Season 7	Ekaterina Varnava						
Season 7	Fatima Khadueva						
Season 7	Angelica Agurbash						
Season 7	Vera Sotnikova						
Season 7	Mikhail Politseymako						
Season 7	Rosa Syabitova						
Season 7	Alexander Inshakov						
Season 7	Zhanna Epple						
Season 7	Boris Grachevsky						
Season 7	Tatiana Lyutaeva						
Season 8	Maria Rasputina						
Season 8	Kirill Safonov						
Season 8	Olga Buzova						
Season 8	Linda						
Season 8	Ekaterina Volkova						
Season 8	Valery Garkalin						
Season 8	Tatiana Vedeneyeva						
Season 8	Svetlana Permyakova						
Season 8	Vladimir Dolinsky						
Season 8	Katya Lel						
Season 9	Aziza						
Season 9	Irina Saltykova						
Season 9	Victor Saltykov						
Season 9	Roman Zhukov						
Season 9	Margarita Sukhankina						
Season 9	Arkady Ukupnik						
Season 10	Olga Shelest						
Season 10	Dmitry Maryanov †						
Season 10	Avraam Russo						
Season 10	Artyom Mikhalkov						
Season 10	Olga Orlova						
Season 10	Vladimir Lyovkin						
Season 10	Elena Valyushkina						
Season 10	Natalya Chistyakova-Ionova (Glukoza)						
Season 10	Victor Rybin						
Season 10	Tatiana Kravchenko						
Season 10	Margarita Drobiazko						
Season 10	Soso Pavliashvili						
Season 10	Irina Pegova						
Season 10	Alexander Litvin						
Season 11	Sergei Pakhomov						
Season 11	Alyona Vodonaeva						
Season 11	Elena Lenina						
Season 11	Alexander Nosik						
Season 11	Anastasia Makeeva						
Season 11	Alexey Vorobyov						
Season 11	Victor Loginov						
Season 11	Yulia Nachalova						
Season 11	Alice Grebenshcikova						
Season 11	Yulia Volkova						
Season 11	Vadim Kazachenko						
Season 11	Sergey Mazaev						
Season 11	Yulia Samoylova						
Season 11	Tatiana Larina						
Season 12	Irina Bezrukova						
Season 12	Prokhor Chaliapin						
Season 12	Yana Troyanova						
Season 12	Ilya Safronov						
Season 12	Dariya Pynzar						
Season 12	Timur Rodriguez						
Season 12	Dominic Joker						
Season 12	Lyubov Tolkalina						
Season 12	Nikita Presnyakov						
Season 12	Patel Trubiner						
Season 12	Aristarkh Venes						
Season 12	Diana Shurygina						
Season 12	Vitaly Gogunsky						
Season 12	Olga Mashnaya						
Season 12	Darya Moroz						
Season 12	Nicole Kuznetsova						
Season 13	Dariya Voskoboeva						
Season 13	Dmitry Khrustalyov						
Season 13	Roman Popov						
Season 13	Natali						
Season 13	Natalya Andrejchenko						
Season 13	Victor Vasilyev						
Season 13	Svetlana Kamynina						
Season 13	Olga Dibtseva						
