= Vadim Kazachenko =

Soviet pop singer (born 1963)

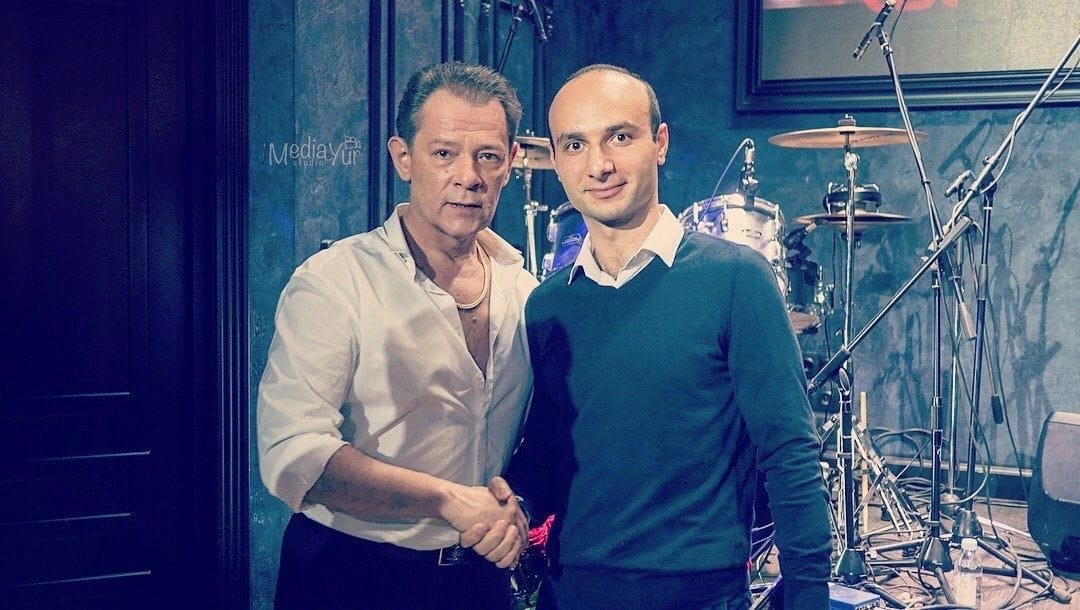
- Kazachenko on the left in 2022
- Born: Vadim Gennadiyevich Kazachenko; 13 July 1963 (age 63); Poltava, Ukrainian SSR, USSR
- Occupation: Singer
- Style: Pop, Disco

Vadim Gennadiyevich Kazachenko (Russian: Вади́м Генна́диевич Казаче́нко; born 13 July 1963) is a Ukrainian singer. His music career spanned throughout in the 1990s. He was the frontman of the Ukranian pop group Freestyle.

== Biography ==
Kazachenko was born on 13 July 1963, in Poltava, Ukrainian SSR.

In 2011, Kazachenko received the Merited Artist of the Russian Federation. He was in the 2011 season of The Invisible Man.

He came second in season 2 of One to One! in 2014. In 2023, he was the first contestant eliminated in season 4 of the Russian version of The Masked Singer, as porcupine.
