= Alisa Mon =

Soviet-Russian musician, composer, & poet (born 1964)

Alisa Mon Алиса Мон
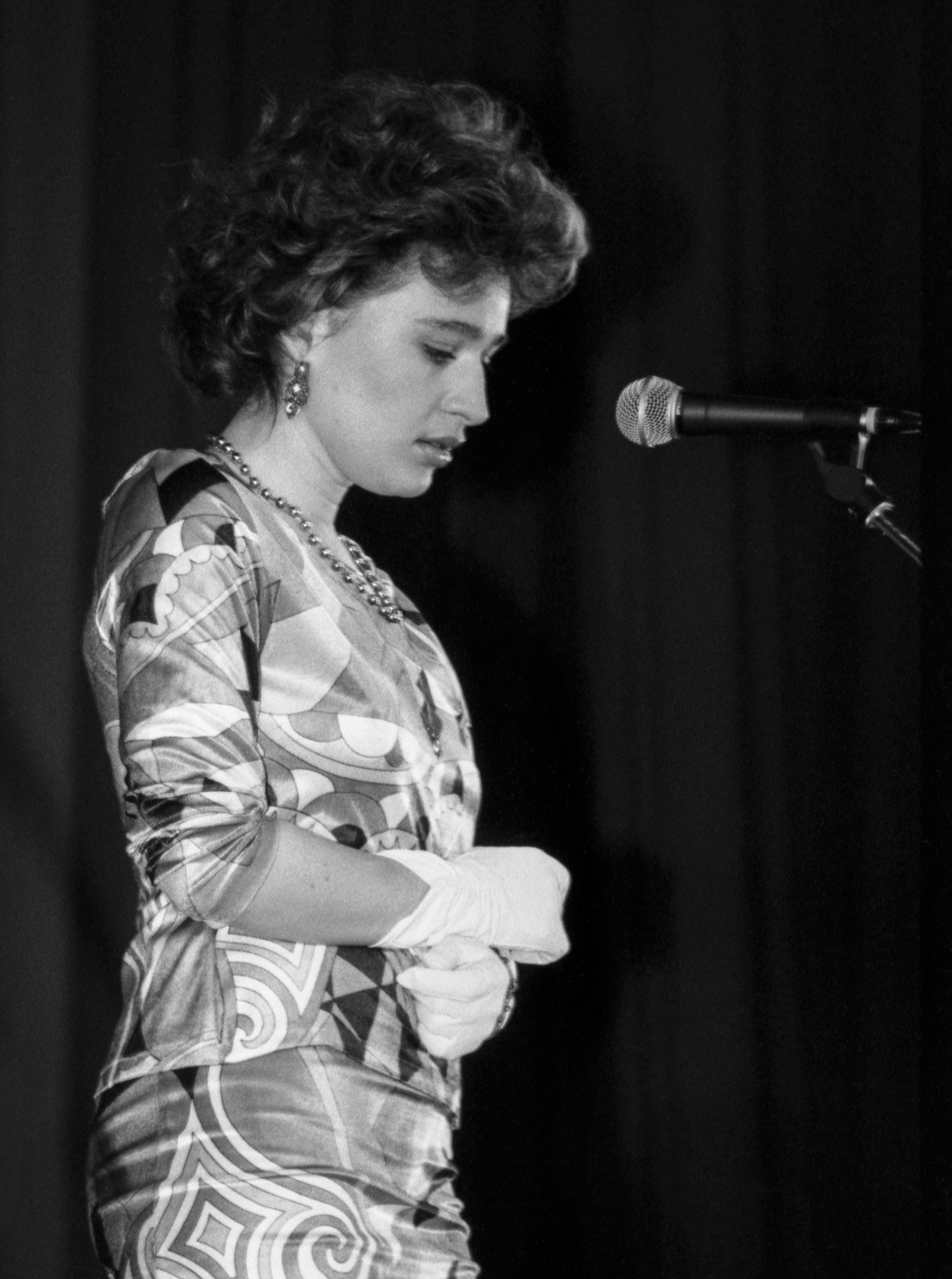
- Alisa Mon in 1991
- Born: Alisa Vladimirovna Mon; 15 August 1964 (age 61); Slyudyanka, Irkutsk Oblast, RSFSR, Soviet Union
- Occupations: Singer; lyricist; composer
- Years active: 1985–present

Alisa Vladimirovna Mon (born 15 August 1964) is a Soviet and Russian pop singer who became popular in the late 1980s after performing the song "Plantain". The second wave of popularity was associated with her 1997 hit "Diamond".

== Early life ==
She was born Svetlana Vladimirovna Bezukh in Slyudyanka, Irkutsk.

In 1983, in Novosibirsk, she entered the pop department at a music school. She worked as a singer in restaurants in Novosibirsk. In 1985 she became a soloist of the school's jazz orchestra. Subsequently, she left the educational institution without receiving secondary education (in her own words, she was expelled for incompetence ).

== Career ==
She took the pseudonym "Alice Mon", which is consonant with the word "Mona Lisa".

From January 1986 to December 1989 she worked in the Labyrinth collective under the direction of Sergei Muravyov at the Novosibirsk State Philharmonic.

In 1988, the album "Take My Heart" was released. It also included the song "Plantain" (lyrics by Mikhail Tanich), which became the singer's first hit after her performance in the program " Song-1988 ". The festival brought the performer the Audience Award and all-Union popularity. In the late 1980s, the first big tour of the Labyrinth group took place.

In 2021, she appeared on the programme, Superstar! Return on the NTV channel. She also performed Can't Get You Out of My Head on the programme Showmaskgoonon the same channel.

In 2022, she performed as a cat as a special guest in the Russian version of The Masked Singer. In 2025, she will appear on One to One!.

== Personal life ==
She lives in Moscow.
