= Leysya, Pesnya =

Soviet Ensemble (1979-1984)

Leysya, Pesnya (Russian: Лейся, песня, literally "Flow, song") was a Soviet vocal and instrumental ensemble active during the 1970s and 1980s. It was founded in 1975 by Valery Seleznev in the city of Kemerovo.

Some of the earliest singers in Leysya, Pesnya included Mikhail Shufutinsky, Vlad Andrianov, Vladimir Efimenko, Igor Ivanov and Yuri Zakharov.

The original Lesya, Pesnya was disbanded in 1984.

== Discography ==
These albums are listed first in Russian, followed by an English translation of the album's name, followed by the year it was made in.

1. Шире круг (Wider Range, 1979)
2. Песни на стихи Михаила Пляцковского (Songs on the Poetry of Mikhail Plyatskovsky, 1981)
3. Танцевальный час (Dancing Hour, 1982)
4. Сегодня и вчера (Yesterday and Today, 1982)
5. Радио — лучше всего (Radio is the Best, 1983)
