= Yulia Nachalova =

Soviet-Russian singer, actress and television presenter (1981–2019)

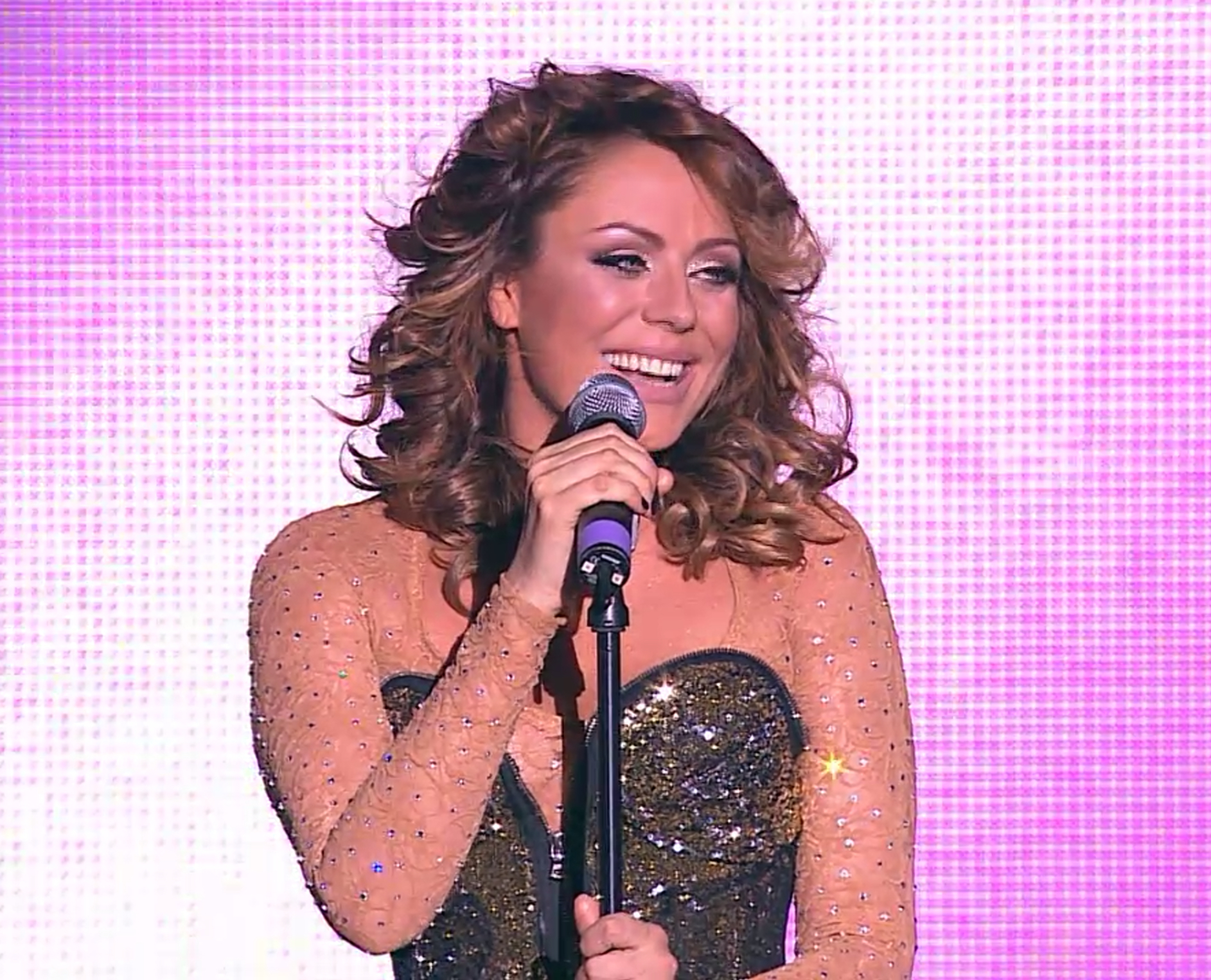
- Nachalova in 2012
- Born: Yulia Viktorovna Nachalova; 31 January 1981; Voronezh, Russian SFSR, Soviet Union
- Died: 16 March 2019 (aged 38); Moscow, Russia
- Occupations: Singer, actress, songwriter, author, TV personality
- Years active: 1986–2019
- Spouses: Dmitry Lanskoy (m. 2001; div. 2004) Evgeni Aldonin (m. 2006; div. 2011)
- Partner: Alexander Frolov (2011-2016)
- Children: 1

Yulia Viktorovna Nachalova (Russian: Ю́лия Ви́кторовна Нача́лова; 31 January 1981 – 16 March 2019) was a Soviet and Russian singer, actress and television presenter.

== Early life ==
Nachalova was born in 1981 in Voronezh in a musical family. Her grandfather, a combine driver and Hero of Labour, played accordion and balalaika. Both Nacholova's parents were professional musicians working at the Voronezh Philharmonic. Nachalova was taught singing from birth and performed for the first time at the age of five in the Philharmonic.

== Career ==
Nachalova rose to fame in Russia as a child star following her participation in the Channel One programme Morning Star in 1991. Recognising her potential, her family moved to Moscow. In 1992, she presented the children's music programme Tam-tam novosti. At the age of 14, Nachalova flew to New York to participate in the music competition Big Apple-1995, where she won the Grand Prix. She has claimed that one of the other participants of the competition was Christina Aguilera. Subsequently, she released her debut album Akh shkola, shkola. She graduated from the pop-jazz department from the Gnessin Musical College.

In 2003, Nachalova was one of the participants in the adventure game show Last Hero 4: End Game. She was the third participant to be evicted from the show after being voted out on day nine. In 2004, she collaborated with Premyer-Ministr on the song "Lyubov-raketa", which peaked at #24 on TopHit radio airplay charts.

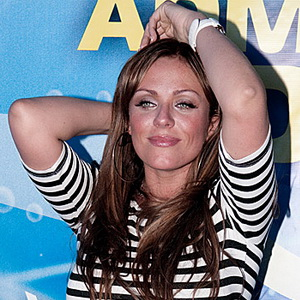
Nachalova in 2010.

In 2005, Nachalova released the album Muzyka lyubvi and a reprint of her 1995 album. From April 2005 until December 2007, she presented the musical show Saturday Evening on RTR alongside Nikolay Baskov. In 2006, Nachalova released two albums, Davay pogovorim o lyubvi and Raznye pesni o glavnom. In 2009, she was part of the jury of the children's version of New Wave.

Nachalova flew to United States in 2010 to record her final and only English-language album Wild Butterfly, which did not manage to secure her a breakthrough outside of Russia.

In 2014, she participated in the second season of One to One! on Russia-1. She stayed on the show for fifteen weeks, eventually finishing fourth overall. She subsequently presented the programme Two Voices on STS alongside Dmitry Shepelev.

== Illness and death ==
Nachalova suffered from long-term health problems starting in 2017, when she was diagnosed with gout. Earlier, in 2007, she had suffered from kidney failure and blood poisoning after a failed plastic surgery.

On 8 March 2019, during a rehearsal for an event in Moscow, Nachalova passed out. She was subsequently taken to hospital. Her situation worsened and she started suffering from gangrene in her legs. On 13 March, she was brought into an artificial coma as doctors operated on her legs.

Nachalova died in the morning of 16 March 2019. Her doctor cited her death as an accident, stating that she died from an infection following the operation and claiming that rumours saying that Nachalova suffered from lupus and diabetes were untrue. Her doctor claimed that Nachalova's death was a result of a "list of unfortunate events", which included her earlier problems with anorexia nervosa in the early 2000s.

== Personal life ==
Nachalova was married to singer Dmitry Lanskoy (Premyer-Ministr) from 2001 to 2004. From 2006 to 2011 she was married to the footballer Evgeni Aldonin. They had one child, a daughter named Vera Aldonina (born 1 December 2006).

Nachalova lived with professional hockey player Alexander Frolov from 2011 to 2016.

== Discography ==
=== Albums ===
Title	Details
Ах, школа, школа	Released: 1995; Label: Unknown; Format: Cassette; CD
Музыка любви	Released: 2005; Label: Sintez Production; Format: CD
Давай поговорим о любви	Released: 2006; Label: Sintez Production; Format: CD
Разные песни о главном	Released: 2006; Label: Sintez Production; Format: CD
Лучшие песни	Released: 2008; Label: Sintez Production; Format: CD
Непридуманные истории	Released: 2012; Label: Misteriya Zvuka; Format: CD
Wild Butterfly	Released: 2013; Label: United Music Group; Format: Digital download, CD

=== Singles ===
Title	Year	Peak chart positions
Title	Year	RUS Airplay
"Lyubov-raketa" (with Premyer-Ministr)	2004	24
"Lyubit tebya" (with Santas)	2005	152
"Dlya tebya"	2009	252
"Ya vybirayu"	2018	—
"Ne otpuskay" (with Dmitry Malikov; posthumously)	2020	—

== Legacy ==
Critics noted Nachalova for her strong voice, but pitied her for a weak and generally unknown repertoire. Her most famous song was "Geroy moego romana", which was noted to be her signature song.

Following her death, Russia-1 and Channel One Russia made several broadcasts to commemorate her death with colleagues and friends recollecting memories they had about Nachalova. On 23 March 2019, musical talk show Hello, Andrey! broadcast an episode in name of her death. Four weeks later, on 27 April 2019, Hello, Andrey! held a second episode centred around her death. On 18 March, one day before her death, Russia-1 broadcast a Live on Air episode titled The last 24 hours of Yulia Nachalova and three days later, another show following her burial in Moscow. Let Them Talk broadcast a total of five episodes on Nachalova's illness and subsequent death.

In 2020, Nachalova's father and aunt published a collection of letters from Yulia Nachalova.

In 2021, Channel One Russia produced and aired a three-part documentary series about her life titled Prolonged History of Yulia Nachalova.
