= Lyubov Kazarnovskaya =

Russian operatic soprano (born 1956)

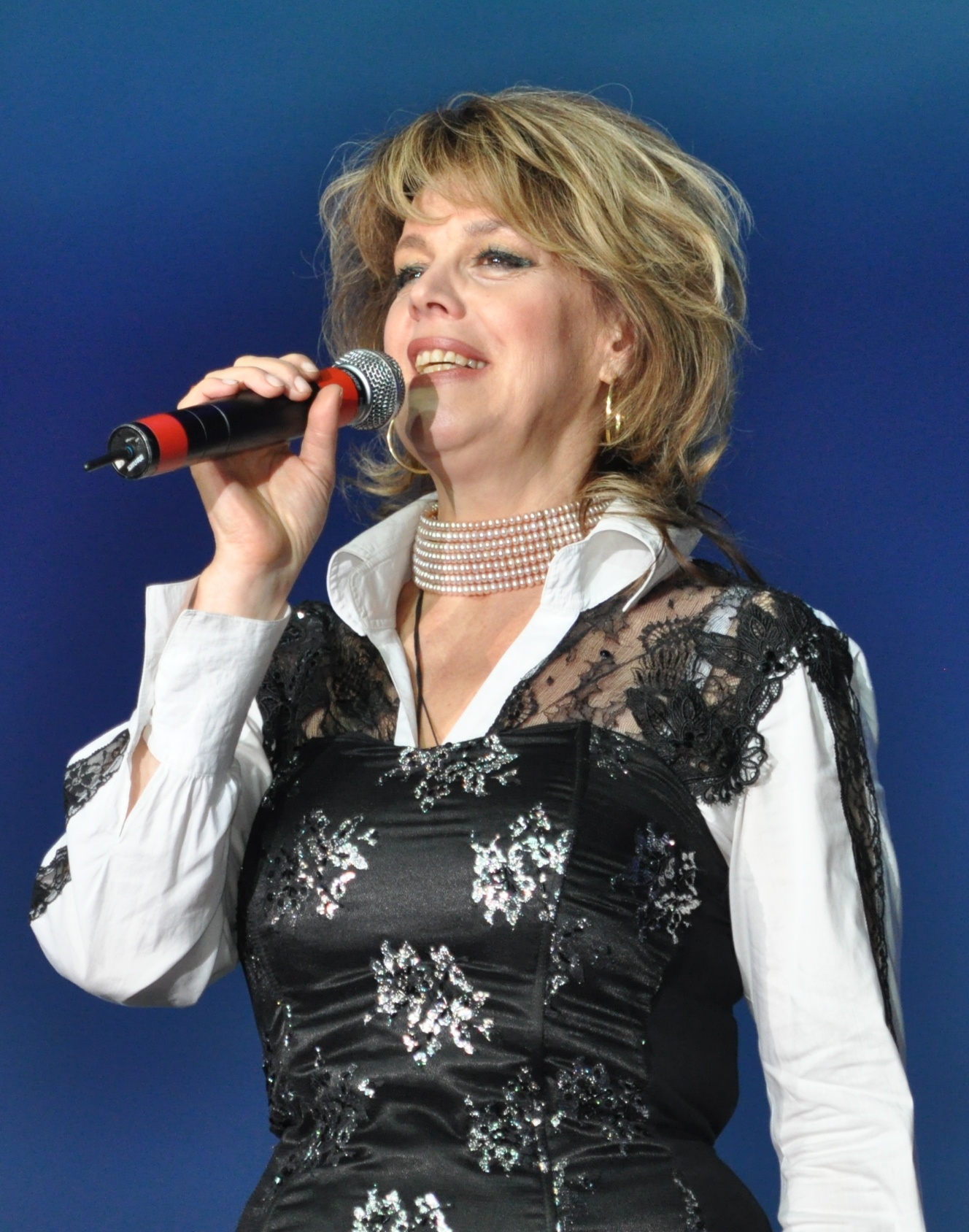
Lyubov Kazarnovskaya at the 2012 Ecumenical council

Lyubov Yurievna Kazarnovskaya (Russian: Любо́вь Ю́рьевна Казарно́вская, born 18 July 1956) is a Russian operatic soprano who has sung leading roles in opera houses around the world. She has recorded for Deutsche Grammophon, Philips, and Naxos Records, amongst others. She has her own music show on Russian television and a weekly one-hour radio program, "Vocalissimo", on Radio Orphej.

== Biography ==
Kazarnovskaya was born in Moscow and trained at the Gnessin State Musical College and the Moscow Conservatory. She made her professional debut in 1981 as Tatyana in Eugene Onegin at the Stanislavsky Opera Theatre. After singing leading roles at that theatre as well as the Bolshoi Theatre and the Mariinsky Theatre, she made her international opera debut in 1990 at the Salzburg Festival. Earlier that year she made her US debut as the soprano soloist in the Boston Symphony Orchestra's performance of Shostakovich's Symphony No. 14.

Between 1991 and 1992, Kazarnovskaya made her house debuts at the Royal Opera House in London, the Vienna State Opera, and the Metropolitan Opera in New York. Her Metropolitan Opera debut was on 26 December 1992 as Tatyana in Eugene Onegin. She sang the role in three performances that season and returned there in the 1994 season when she sang Desdemona in Otello and Nedda in Pagliacci

== Personal life ==
In 1989 she married the opera producer from Austria Robert Rostsik. In 1993 their son Andrey was born.

They met when Robert came to listen to a young generation of Russian singers. Kazarnovskaya then worked at the Mariinsky Theater in St. Petersburg. According to her, it was not a love at first sight but they began to communicate with great interest. When the singer came to audition in Vienna they began a romantic relationship that led to a wedding.

== Sources ==
- Naxos Records, "Kazarnovskaya, Ljuba"
- Metropolitan Opera, Kazarnovskaya, Ljubov (soprano), performance record on the MetOpera Database.
- Opera News, "Opera Watch", February 1993.
- Sleeman, Elizabeth (ed.), "Kazarnovskaya, Ljuba", The International Who's Who of Women 2002, Routledge, 2001, p. 289. ISBN 1-85743-122-7
