= Mikhail Muromov =

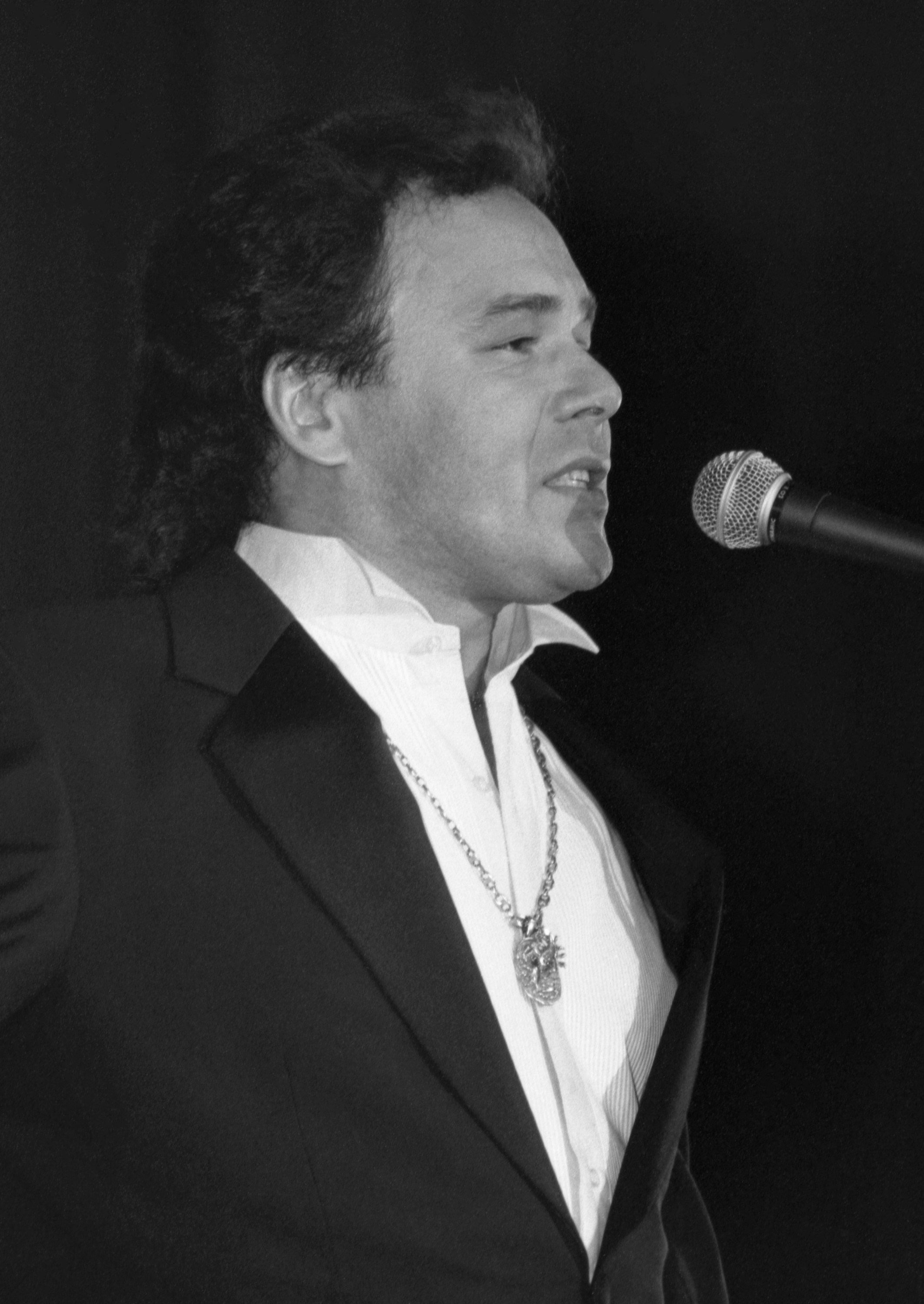
- 25 December 1991

Background information
- Born: Mikhail Vladimirovich Muromov; 18 November 1950 (age 75)
- Genres: Pop, Russian pop
- Occupations: Singer, composer

Mikhail Vladimirovich Muromov (Russian: Михаи́л Владими́рович Му́ромов; born 18 November 1950, Moscow ) is a Soviet Russian singer, actor, musician and composer.

== Discography ==
- 1984 – Captains
- 1986 – Risk Area
- 1986 – Home Magnetoalbum
- 1987 – Apples in Snow
- 1987 – The Guys from Afghanistan
- 1987 – Sings Mikhail Muromov
- 1988 – Business Woman
- 1989 – The Witch
- 1990 – Sweet Poison
- 1990 – No.1 (LP)
- 1992 – Super 2 (LP)
- 1994 – Afghanistan
- 1994 – A Strange Woman
- 1994 – Salute, Beloved
- 2001 – Names For All Times
- 2005 – Grand Collection
- 2017 – Pink on White 2017

== Popular songs ==
- Apples in Snow (Andrey Dementyev)
- Ariadna (Rimma Kazakova)
- Afghanistan (Andrey Dementyev)
- Forest Academy (Sergey Mikhalkov)
- A Strange Woman (Larisa Rubalskaya)

== Filmography ==
- 1981 — The Only Man as policeman
- 1982 — The Trust That Went Bust as busker
- 1982 — Just Awful! as composer
- 1986 – The Right People as bouncer at the restaurant
- 1987 — Daughter as Alexander, the singer
- 1991 — Dura as Miguel
