= Elena Kamburova =

Russian singer and actress (born 1940)

Elena Kamburova Елена Антоновна Камбурова
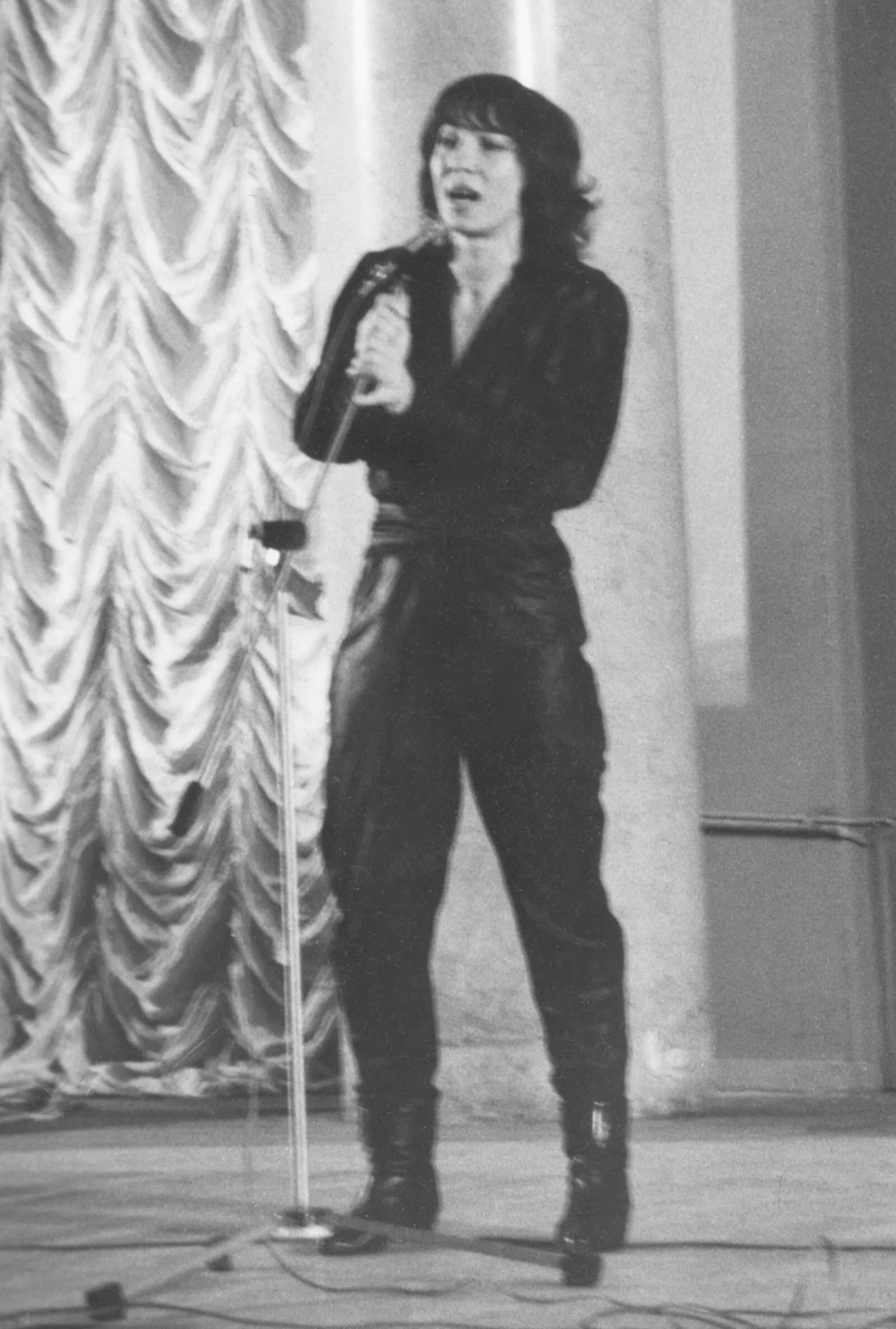

Background information
- Born: Elena Antonovna Kamburova; July 11, 1940 (age 86); Stalinsk, Russian SFSR, Soviet Union
- Genres: Chanson, poetry soundtracks
- Occupations: Singer, actress, theatre director
- Instrument: Vocals
- Years active: 1960s–present
- Award: People's Artist of the Russian Federation

Elena Antonovna Kamburova (Russian: Елена Антоновна Камбурова; born July 11, 1940) is a Russian singer and actress. In addition to numerous solo albums, her voice is recorded in more than a hundred film soundtracks. She is a People's Artist of the Russian Federation.

Born in Stalinsk, she was brought up in Ukraine where her family relocated. In 1967, she graduated from the State College of Circus and Variety Art (Государственное училище циркового и эстрадного искусства), and in 1979 from GITIS.

In the 1960s, Kamburova participated in concerts and radio recordings. She performed songs by Novella Matveyeva and Bulat Okudzhava. Okudzhava once noted that her art is "a lucky combination of voice, intellect, and talent." From mid-1970s, compositions of Vladimir Dashkevich made up a significant part of her repertoire, based on the lyrics by Vladimir Mayakovsky, Alexander Blok and (unfavorable with the Soviet authorities) Marina Tsvetayeva, Anna Akhmatova and Osip Mandelstam.

In 1992, Kamburova founded The Moscow Theater of Music and Poetry, where she acts as the director, a performer and an actress.

== Discography ==
=== LPs ===
- Прощай, оружие (A Farewell to Arms – on motives of Ernest Hemingway, 1970)
- Поет Елена Камбурова (Elena Kamburova Sings, 1975)
- Сказки об Италии (Tales about Italy, 1981)
- Послушайте (Listen, 1982)
- Да осенит тишина (Let There Be Silence, 1987)

=== CDs ===
- Дрёма (Dream – Russian lullabies, 1997)
- Капли Датского короля (The Mixture of Danish King, 1999)
- Волшебная скрипка (The Magic Violin, 1999)
- Синий троллейбус (Blue Trolleybus – songs by Bulat Okudzhava, 1999)
- Дорога (The Road, 2000)
- Любовь и разлука (Love and Separation, 2001)
- Песни из кинофильмов – 1 (Songs from Films – part 1, 2001)
- Песни из кинофильмов – 2 (Songs from Films – part 2, 2001)
- Романс о жизни и смерти (Romance of Life and Death, 2004)
- Воспоминание о шарманке (A Recollection about the Barrel-Organ – songs by Larissa Kritskaya, 2007)
- Реквием (Requiem of Anna Akhmatova, music by Vladimir Dashkevich, live, 2007)
- Концерт в театре "Школа современной пьесы" (Live in the School of Modern Play Theater, 2008)
- Концерт в театре Музыки и Поэзии (Live in the Theater of Music and Poetry, 2008, DVD)

== Films ==
- Hans Christian Andersen's The Little Mermaid – Marina (Singing voice in Matteo Hitto)
- The Adventures of the Elektronic – Syroyezhkin (Singing voice)
