= Igor Sarukhanov =

Igor Armenovich Sarukhanov Игорь Арменович Саруханов
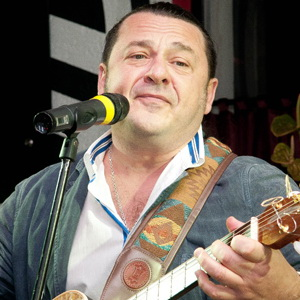

Background information
- Born: 6 April 1956 (age 70); Samarkand, Uzbek SSR, Soviet Union (present-day Uzbekistan)
- Genres: Soft rock, pop, Soviet music, blue-eyed soul, Russian chanson
- Occupations: Singer-songwriter, musician
- Instruments: Singing, guitar

Igor Armenovich Sarukhanov (Note: Russian: Игорь Арменович Саруханов, romanized: Igor Armenovich Sarukhanov; Armenian: Իգոր Արմենի Սարուխանով, romanized: Igor Armeni Sarowxanov) (born 6 April 1956) is a Russian pop musician, composer and artist of Armenian descent, as well as Meritorious Artist of Russia (1997).

Sarukhanov was born in Samarkand. He finished the Musical college of Moscow. He was a member of Tsvety Soviet rock band, worked with Alla Pugachyova, Anne Veski etc. Since 1985 he started a solo-career and already has 10 albums released during this period, including 4 LPs in USSR. He was most popular artist in USSR, like Yuri Antonov, Valeri Leontiev.
