= Boris Moiseev =

Russian singer (1954–2022)

Boris Moiseev Борис Моисеев
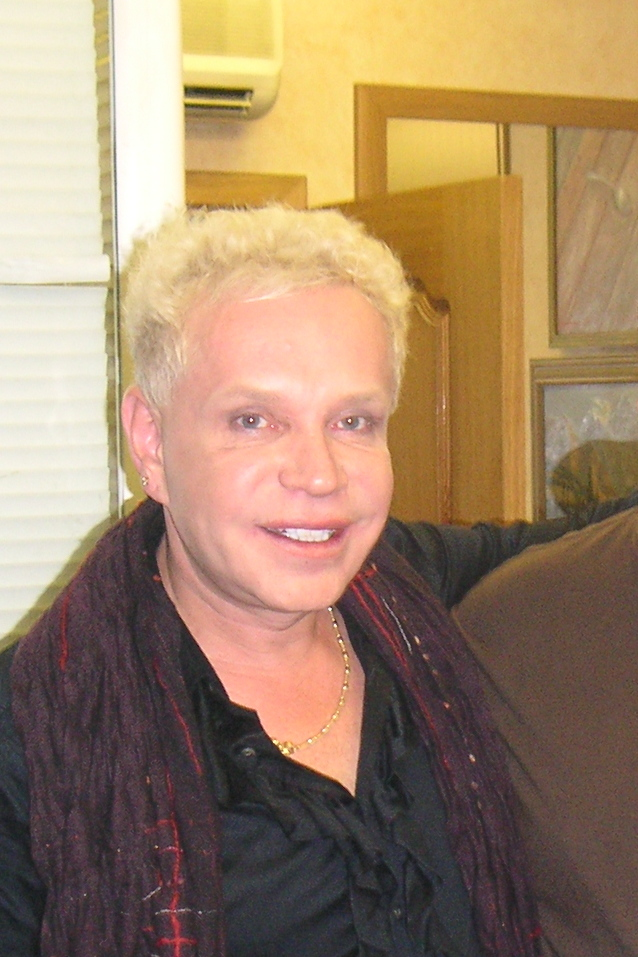
- Moiseev in 2005

Background information
- Born: Boris Mikhailovich Moiseev; 4 March 1954; Mogilev, Byelorussian SSR, Soviet Union
- Died: 27 September 2022 (aged 68) Moscow, Russia
- Genres: Pop
- Occupations: Singer, choreographer, actor
- Instrument: Vocals
- Years active: 1975–2017
- Partner: Vladimir Soloviov

Boris Mikhailovich Moiseev (Russian: Бори́с Миха́йлович Моисе́ев; 4 March 1954 – 27 September 2022) was a Soviet and Russian choreographer, dancer, singer, writer, actor, head of a dance group, and author of popular shows in Russia. He was a Merited Artist of Russia (2006).

== Early life ==
Boris Moiseev was born in prison in Mogilev, Byelorussian SSR, Soviet Union, his mother was being held as a disenfranchised element during the Soviet regime. He spent his childhood and teenage years among his Lithuanian Jewish aunts in Mogilev. To strengthen his health, Boris was sent to a dancing school. Since then dancing took over all his interests and turned into a lifetime passion. He dropped out of the school, packed his bags and ran away to Minsk. There Boris got accepted to a choreography school and became a professional classical dancer.

== Career beginning ==
Boris had all the skills to succeed as a classical dancer on the stage but he preferred modern dance. After his graduation Moiseev was expelled from Minsk because of his very open, for that time, ways of self-expression. He moved to Kharkiv where Moiseev became a ballet teacher but in 1975 he was expelled from Komsomol and left Kharkiv for Kaunas. He became a head of the Lithuanian dance group Trimitas. In 1978 Moiseev created famous dancing trio Ekspressiya which became a part of Alla Pugacheva's studio. In 1987 the trio quit working with Pugacheva and went on tours to the United States, Italy, and France. The trio has existed and for a very long time. In addition Moiseev was invited to work as a ballet teacher for many American shows. In 2004, Boris Moiseev was threatened at Boris Moiseev's concerts in Russia by homophobic Orthodox demonstrators. The singer spoke openly about his homosexuality.

== Return to Russia ==
Moiseev came back to Russia in 1991, filming a documentary on Ekspressia. He died from a stroke in Moscow on 27 September 2022, at the age of 68.

== Health Issues and Death (2011-2022) ==
Moiseev suffered three strokes between 2011 and 2022. As a result of the first two strokes, Moiseev became partially immobilized on his left side and suffered slurred speech. Despite his health difficulties, he went to second term on work scene. During these years, he was routinely attended to at home by concert director Sergei Gorokh. On 27 September 2022, Gorokh attended to Moiseev and found Moiseev unresponsive in bed. Attempts to revive him were unsuccessful, and he was pronounced deceased at 68 in Moscow.

== Discography ==
=== CD albums ===
- Child of Vice (Russian: Дитя порока) (1996)
- Holiday! Holiday! (Russian: Праздник! Праздник!) (1998)
- Just a Nutcracker (Russian: Просто Щелкунчик) (1999)
- In secret... (Russian: По секрету…) (2000)
- Swan (Russian: Лебедь) (2000)
- Shall we dance?! (Russian: Потанцуем?!) (2001)
- Alien (Russian: Чужой) (2002)
- Beloved person (Russian: Любимый человек) (2004)
- Angel (Russian: Ангел) (2006)
- Bird. Live Sound (Russian: Птичка. Живой звук) (2007)
- Pastor. The best of men (Russian: Пастор. Лучший из мужчин) (2012)

=== DVD albums ===
- Boris Moiseev. Just a Nutcracker (Russian: Борис Моисеев. Просто щелкунчик) (2005)
- Boris Moiseev and his lady: 5 years later (Russian: Борис Моисеев и его леди: 5 лет спустя) (2005)
- Boris Moiseev. The show goes on (Russian: Борис Моисеев. Шоу продолжается) (2005)
- Boris Moiseev. Swan (Russian: Борис Моисеев. Лебедь) (2005)
- Boris Moiseev. Kingdom of Love (Russian: Борис Моисеев. Королевство любви) (2005)
- Forever yours... Boris Moiseev (Russian: Навеки Ваш… Борис Моисеев) (2005)
- Ladies and Gentlemen (Russian: Леди и Джентльмены) (2009)
- Desert (Russian: Десерт) (2009)
