= Igor Ivanov (singer) =

Soviet-Russian singer (born 1953)

Igor Ivanov Игорь Иванов
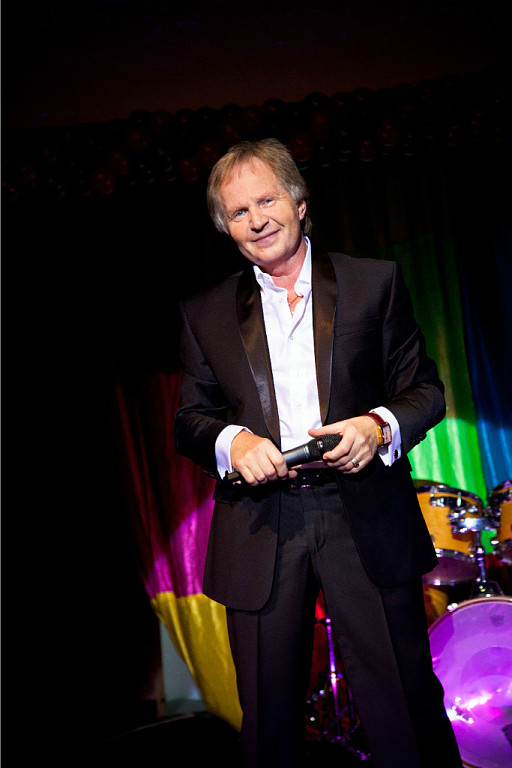
- Ivanov in 2013

Background information
- Born: Igor Vladimirovich Ivanov; 15 June 1953 (age 73); Moscow, RSFSR, USSR (now Russia)
- Occupation: singer
- Label: Melodiya
- Website: igorivanov.ru

Igor Vladimirovich Ivanov (Russian: И́горь Влади́мирович Ивано́в; born 15 June 1953 in Moscow) is a Soviet and Russian pop singer. The first performer of the songs Farewell, I Can Not Dance, Of Vagant.

== Biography ==
Igor was born in Moscow. From a young age he was fond of music, was a member of the school choir, played the guitar, performed in an amateur vocal-instrumental ensemble.

Popularity peak fell on 70th. In 1975 he, the soloist of Leysya, Pesnya, performed the song Farewell (now better known by Lev Leshchenko), which later became a hit. The memorable voice of the singer attracted the attention of David Tukhmanov, who invited Ivanov to record the disk By the Wave of My Memory. The song Of Vagant (The Song of Student) quickly gained popularity.

In the mid 80s he was a participant and presenter of the popular television program Wider Circle. In 1981, Ivanov's first solo minion was released, which included such songs as Love Must be Cherished, Love Leaves, Nothing Else, I Remember Everything.

In 1983, according to numerous surveys, Igor Ivanov entered the list of the most popular performers of the country. Participant of the international festival Slavianski Bazaar in Vitebsk.

After the collapse of the major concerts. However, Ivanov from touring around the world did not stop. In 2008, Ivanov was awarded the Ministry of Culture of the Russian Federation for high achievements.

Today, Igor Ivanov continues to actively tour and give concerts.
