= Irina Zabiyaka =

Russian singer (born 1982)

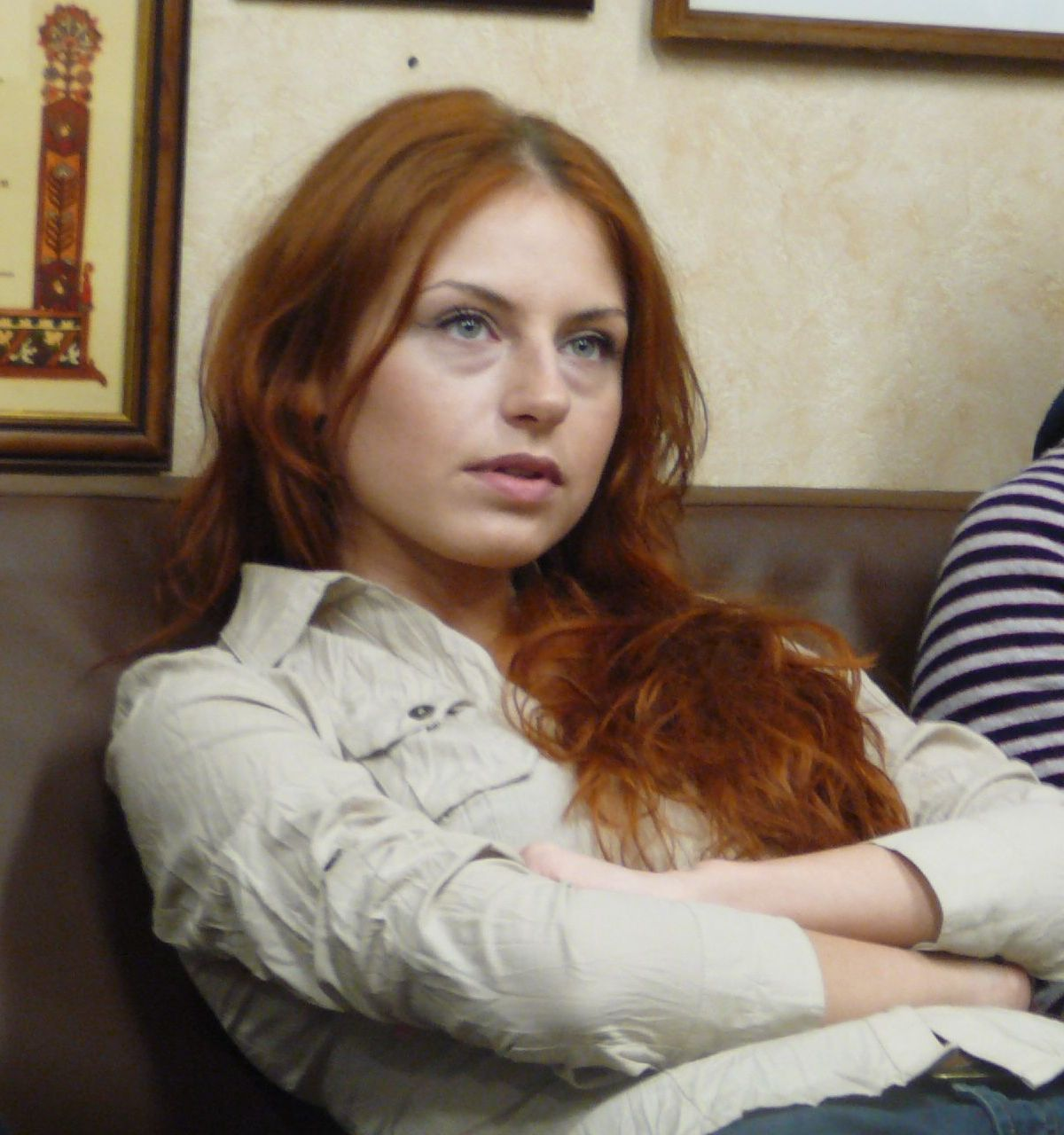

Background information
- Born: Irina Alekseevna Zabiyaka; 20 December 1982 (age 43); Kirovohrad, Ukrainian SSR, USSR
- Genres: Pop rock
- Occupation: singer
- Instrument: voice
- Years active: 2005–present
- Member of: Chi-Li
- Website: chi-lli.ru

Irina Alekseevna Zabiyaka (Russian: Ирина Алексеевна Забияка, born 20 December 1982) is a Russian singer and lead vocalist, songwriter in the popular Russian group Chi-Li (Russian: Чи-Ли). She is known for her deep contralto voice.

Her height is 5 ft 8.5 in (174 cm).

== Background ==
Irina was born and brought up in the Ukrainian town of Kirovohrad (present day Kropyvnytskyi), by her Ukrainian mother. At the age of 1, she left there to live in the Russian city of Kaliningrad.

Irina's mother did not want to tell her daughter that her father had died, so made up a story that he was a Chilean revolutionary. The young Ira believed the story and was proud of who she believed her father to be, with this influence going onto later see her band named Chi-Li.

== Private life ==
In January 2013 she gave birth to a son.
