= Vladimir Markin =

Russian pop singer (born 1959)

Vladimir Markin Владимир Маркин
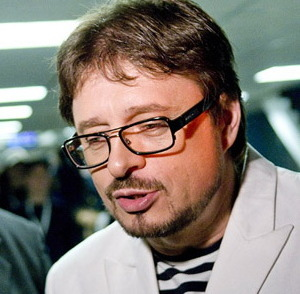
- Markin in 2009

Background information
- Born: 8 September 1959 (age 66); Korolyov, Moscow Oblast, RSFSR, USSR
- Years active: 1983–2021
- Website: markin.ru

Vladimir Nikolaevich Markin (Russian: Влади́мир Никола́евич Ма́ркин; born 8 May 1959, Korolyov, Moscow Oblast, USSR) is a Russian pop singer, entrepreneur, composer, songwriter.

From 2012 he was a member of the municipal Assembly District Vykhino-Zhulebino in Moscow from Communist Party of the Russian Federation, although he was not a member of the party.

He occupied the position of director of the Palace of Culture Moscow Power Engineering Institute.
