= Yaroslav Yevdokimov =

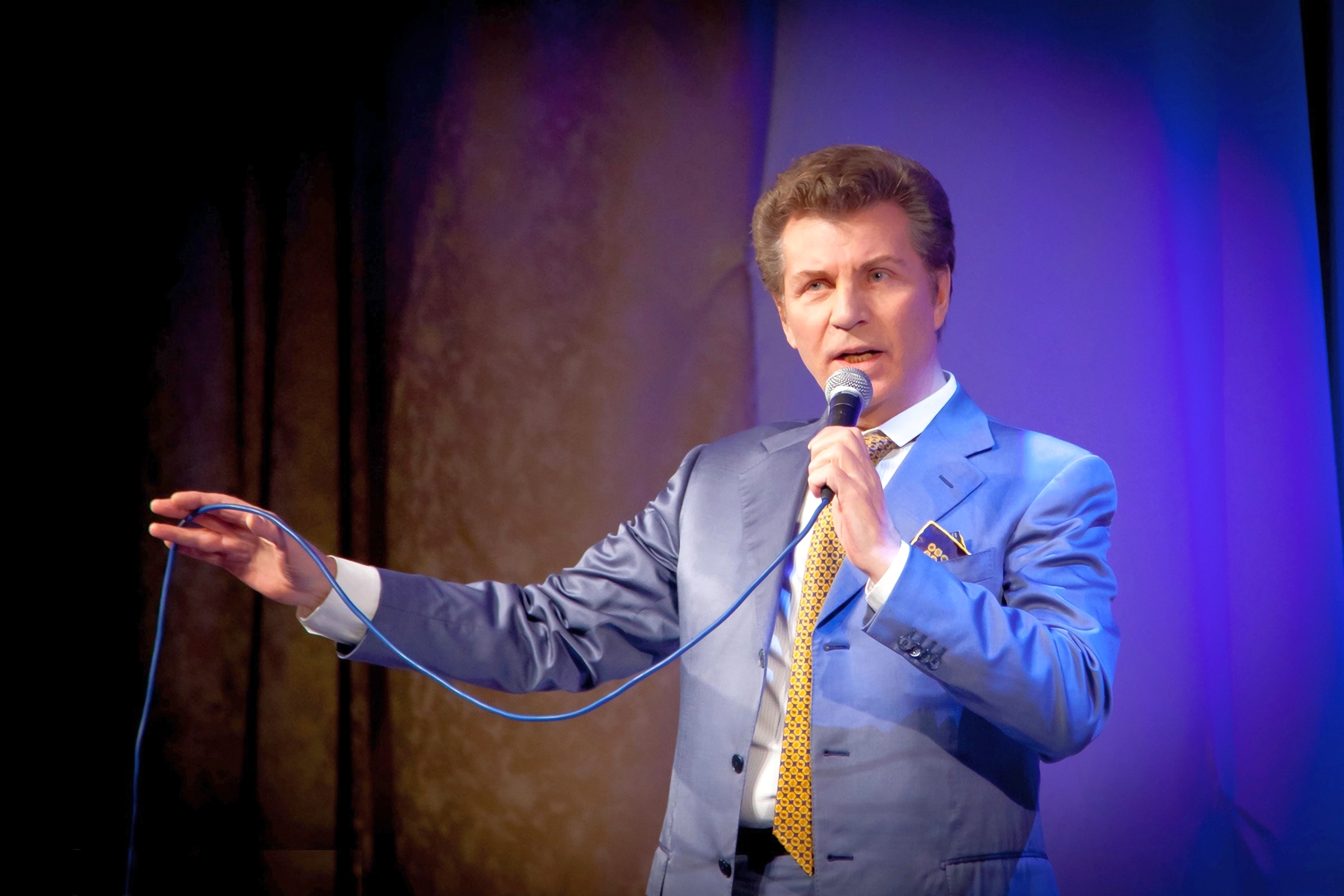

Background information
- Born: Yaroslav Alexandrovych Yevdokimov; 22 November 1946; Rivne, Ukrainian SSR, USSR
- Died: 22 August 2025 (aged 78)
- Genres: Pop
- Occupation: Singer
- Years active: 1975–2023
- Labels: Melodiya; MTM Ltd. United Music; CD Land; Astra
- Website: www.yaevdokimov.com

Yaroslav Olexandrovych Yevdokimov (Ukrainian: Ярослав Олександрович Євдокимов; 22 November 1946 – 22 August 2025) was a Ukrainian-born Belarusian baritone, Honored Artist of the Russian Federation and People's Artist of Belarus. He died on 22 August 2025, at the age of 78.

== Honoured ranks ==
- 17 April 1980 – According to the Decree of the Presidium of the Supreme Soviet of the Byelorussian Soviet Socialist Republic, he was given the honorary title Honored Artist of the Byelorussian SSR;
- 13 July 1987 – According to the Decree of the Presidium of the Supreme Soviet of the Byelorussian Soviet Socialist Republic, he was given the honorary title People's Artist of the BSSR;
- 15 February 2006 – Presidential Decree awarded him the honorary title Meritorious Artist.

== Discography ==
- 1988 – Everything will come true;
- 1994 – Don’t tear the shirt – songs by V. Okorokova (CD);
- 2002 – Dreamer – songs by A. Morozova (CD);
- 2002 – Kiss your palm (CD);
- 2006 – Beyond the White River (CD);
- 2008 – Yaroslav Yevdokimov and the band Sladka Yagoda. The best Ukrainian and Cossack’s songs (CD);
- 2012 – Return to autumn (CD)

== Sources ==
- Беларуская энцыклапедыя. Т. 6. – Мн., 1998. Энцыклапедыя літаратуры і мастацтва Беларусі. Т. 2. – Мн., 1985.
- Encykłapiedyja biełaruskaj papularnaj muzyki. Mińsk: Zmicier Kołas, 2008, s. 368. ISBN 978-985-6783-42-8. (biał.)
