= Masha Rasputina =

Russian pop singer (born 1964)

Masha Rasputina Маша Распутина
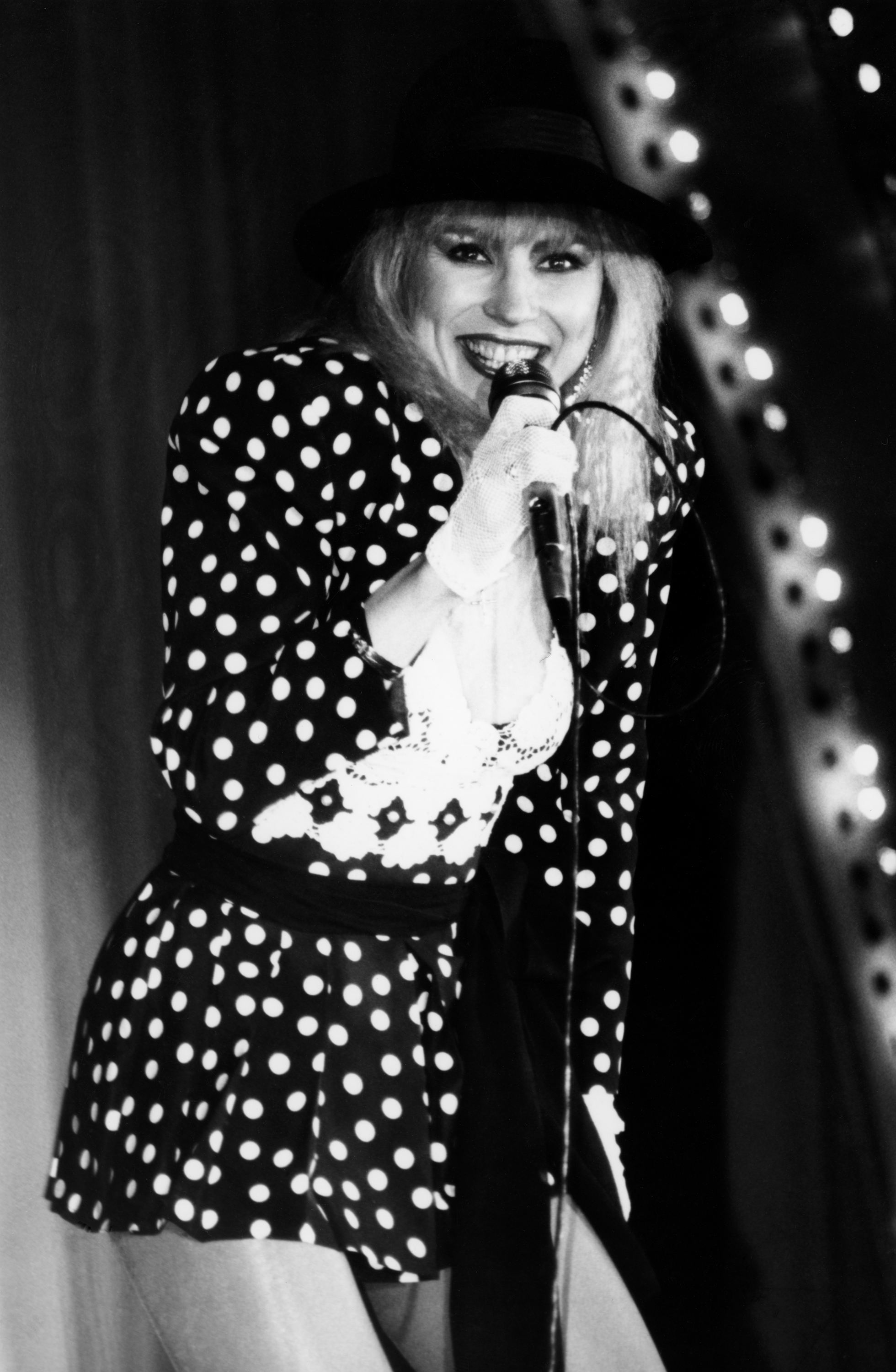
- Rasputina in 1991

Background information
- Also known as: Masha Rasputina
- Born: Alla Nikolayevna Ageeva; May 13, 1964 (age 62); Inskoy, Kemerovo Oblast, RSFSR, Soviet Union
- Genres: Russian pop, Traditional pop
- Occupations: Singer, actress
- Instrument: Singing
- Years active: 1989–present
- Website: www.masharasputina.com

Masha Rasputina (Russian: Маша Распутина, born Alla Nikolayevna Ageeva, Russian: Алла Николаевна Агеева) is a Russian pop singer, who went through her peak of popularity in the 1990s and 2000s. In 2003, she scored her biggest hit, "Roza chaynaya" (Russian: Роза чайная, meaning "Tea rose"), a duet with Philipp Kirkorov.

== Early life ==
Rasputina was born in Inskoy, Kemerovo Oblast in 1964 as the daughter of an employee of the local power station and an Odessa-born hydriologist. As a child, Rasputina moved to the village of Urop, where she lived with her paternal grandparents. Following her parents footsteps, Rasputina initially applied for a technical course, but dropped out as she preferred to immerse herself in music. She then moved to Moscow, taking part in multiple auditions, with different outcomes. Eventually, she was employed as an ensemblist in a Moscow ensemble and decided to pick up studies at the Kemerovo State University of Culture and Arts. She graduated from the university and pursued a second degree at the Tver Musical School in choir conducting, which she completed in 1988.

== Career ==
Rasputina moved to Moscow following her education and tried breaking into the Soviet musical scene. With the song "Igray muzykant", she debuted on the Soviet television programme Morning post. Here, she started singing under the pseudonym Masha Rasputina, which was advised to her by a friend.

She recorded her first album Gorodskaya sumasshedshaya in 1991. Among one of her first large breakthrough performances was a duet with Vyacheslav Dobrynin during the 1991 version of Pesnya goda. After her fame rose in the newborn Russia in the early 1990s, Rasputina decided that she wanted to break through abroad with an album with Russian-language chansons called I was born in Siberia. The album did not chart anywhere abroad, but was commercially successful within Russia and other Russian-speaking areas. The song "Ty menya ne budi", from the eponymous album, featured in Pesnya goda.

Rasputina decreased her concert activities around 1999 to give birth to her second child in 2000. In 2003, she started collaborating heavily with Philipp Kirkorov. Their first single together, "Roza chaynaya" became one of the largest hits in the country in that year. Another duet "Dzhalma" performed well on the charts as well. That same year, she released her most successful album Roza chaynaya. A next solo single of hers, "Mechty", also achieved popularity.

In that time, Masha Rasputina toured the country and took part in many television recordings, most notably Fabrika Zvyozd, in which she guest performed alongside several participants. In 2007, during a performance on that show, she fell backwards on the stage. The performance was only shown in the Krasnoyarsk version of the broadcast as it was cut out for the broadcast in all other time zones as of the country. After a last hit duet with Kirkorov, "Proshay", in 2007, her fame started to decline and appearances in public started to decrease. In 2011, she announced her withdrawal from the big stage, vowing to only perform at smaller events. In 2015, she released the single "Zhyoltye list'ya".

== Image ==
During the peak in her career, Rasputina was known for her over-the-top, husky vocal style, fiery stage persona and flamboyant, somewhat controversial image with the emphasis on grotesque sexuality and crude, ‘common girl’ manners. Komsomolskaya Pravda regarded her as one of the sex symbols of the 1990s. She was also known for her crude off-stage behaviour, using foul language at multiple occasions. In a 2021 interview, Rasputina said that her image was part of the showbusiness culture of that time, which was expecting "youthfulness, energy and mischief", but that it never contained vulgarity or filth in her eyes.

== Personal life ==
Masha Rasputina married her producer Vladimir Yermmakov. From this marriage, Rasputina's eldest daughter, Lidiya was born in 1985. Yermakov and Rasputina divorced in the late 1990s. In 1999, Rasputina married her second husband, producer Viktor Zakharov. Her second daughter, Mariya, was born a year later.

== Discography ==
=== Albums ===
- Городская сумасшедшая (A Town's Mad Girl, 1991)
- Я родилась в Сибири (I Was Born in Siberia, 1993)
- Синий понедельничек (Blue Monday, 1994)
- Я была на Венере (I Visited Venus, 1995)
- Ты меня не буди (Don't Wake Me Up, 1999)
- Поцелуй меня при всех (Kiss Me in Public, 2000)
- Живи, страна! (Live, My Country, 2001)
- Роза чайная (Rose Tea Room, 2003)
- Маша Распутина. The Best (The Best of Masha Rasputina, compilation, 2008)

=== Singles ===
Title	Year	Peak chart positions	Album
Title	Year	RUS Airplay	Album
"Dozhd' sumasshedshiy"	2003	—	Roza chaynaya
"Sinyaya ptitsa"	2003	37	Izbrannoe
"Dzhalma" (with Philipp Kirkorov)	2003	40	Izbrannoe
"Proshay" (with Philipp Kirkorov)	2007	47	Izbrannoe
"Zhyoltye list'ya"	2015	209	Non-album single
