= Duna (band) =

Russian pop group

Duna Дюна
- Origin: Dolgoprudny, Moscow Oblast, Russia
- Genres: Crust punk, D-beat (early), Euro disco, pop, rock, house
- Years active: 1987–present
- Labels: Soyuz, Melodiya, others
- Members: Viktor Rybin; Igor Pliaskin; Mikhail Dulsky; Andrei Apukhtin; Renat Sharibjanov; Mikhail Yudin
- Past members: Dmitri Chetvergov; Andrei Shatunovsky; Sergei Katin; Andrei Rublyov; Aleksandr Serov; Pavel Smeyan; Leonid Petrenko; Sergei Kadnikov
- Website: limonia.ru

Duna (Russian: Дюна) is a Russian pop band formed in 1987. They became popular in 1989 just before the collapse of the Soviet Union with the song "The Land of Limonia".

== Members ==
- Viktor "Ryba" Rybin (vocals, percussion — since 1987)
- Igor Pliaskin (guitars — since 2002)
- Mikhail "Filyovsky Oboroten" Dulsky (guitars — since 1992)
- Andrei "Tolsty" Apukhtin (keyboards — since 1991)
- Renat "Grach" Sharibjanov (bass guitar — since 1993)
- Mikhail "Mefodiy" Yudin (drums — since 2006)

== Former members ==
- Dmitri Chetvergov
- Andrei Shatunovsky
- Sergei Katin
- Andrei Rublyov
- Aleksandr Serov
- Pavel Smeyan
- Leonid Petrenko
- Sergei Kadnikov
