= Shura (Russian singer) =

Russian singer (born 1975)

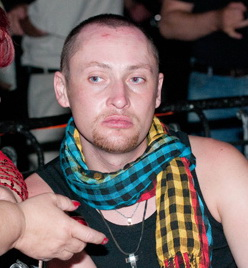
- Shura in July 2010

Background information
- Born: Alexander Vladimirovich Medvedev; 20 May 1975 (age 51); Novosibirsk, Soviet Union
- Genres: Pop; Eurodance
- Occupations: Singer; songwriter
- Years active: 1997–present
- Labels: Soyuz; Gramophone; Prologue Music; Monolit Records
- Website: shuraofficial.ru

Alexander Vladimirovich Medvedev (Russian: Александр Владимирович Медведев, born 20 May 1975), also known as Shura (Russian: Шура), is a Russian singer/songwriter.

He reached his career peak at the end of the 1990s. He gained popularity due to his unconventional appearance (including his lack of front teeth) and performance.

== Early life ==
Shura was born in Novosibirsk on 20 May 1975. His parents met when his mother Svetlana was 17 years old and his father Vladimir was 20 years old. A year later she gave birth to Sasha. Shortly after, his parents separated and his mother married Nikolay Dudchenko. His father did not take part in the life of his son. Alexander was an unwanted child who was beaten by his mother and was given to an orphanage when he was nine. His teeth were knocked out by his younger brother Mikhail, with whom he often feuded.

From age 12, he sang in the Novosibirsk restaurant "Rus", where his grandmother Vera Mikhailovna worked as chef. Shura did not finish high school. He was expelled after the seventh grade with a certificate of "incomplete secondary education".

Shura went to Riga, where he graduated from the course of designers and florists and received a master's diploma in making ikebana. In the mid-1990s, Shura became a "mass-entertainer". He began to sing songs of Novosibirsk composer Pavel Yesenin when he was 17.

You can say that the restaurant gave me a chance. It was there, when I was 17, that I met a young musician Pavel Yesenin. Pasha wrote a few songs for me, over time they became hits. The first person who appreciated my album was my grandmother. She said: "You sing so well! But only in what language, I did not understand. " Then Pasha convinced me that with this album success waits for me. And I went from Novosibirsk to Moscow.

— Shura

On 10 January 2018, he underwent surgery for a hip replacement at the Russian Ilizarov Scientific Center for Restorative Traumatology and Orthopaedics.

== Personal life ==
Another night alone I live another play,
Like to the sun I've met I'm old because they say.
My sun can move like that and I stop fun it they don't care,
Your voice gonna find out sound I'll have enough your say.
You gonna give over motion, уou gonna give over motion.

— Shura, Don-don-don

In spite of his perceived homosexuality, which he called part of his image, Shura introduced his fiancée Lisa to the public in May 2010.

Shura was a drug addict. He spent $2,000 for treating his drug addiction.

He was diagnosed with testicular cancer. He underwent an operation and 18 rounds of chemotherapy. The rehabilitation period lasted four years. During that time, he was reliant on a wheelchair and had a tremor in his right hand that lasted a year and a half. He spent roughly a million dollars on treatment in clinics in Russia and Switzerland. In 2019, during the period of his drug addiction, Shura gifted his flat to scammers. On 30 April 2019, a Russian court rejected his claim against the scammers.

== Awards ==
In 1998, he was awarded the Golden Gramophone Award for the song "Ты не верь слезам".
