= Katya Lel =

Russian singer (born 1974)

- Катя Лель
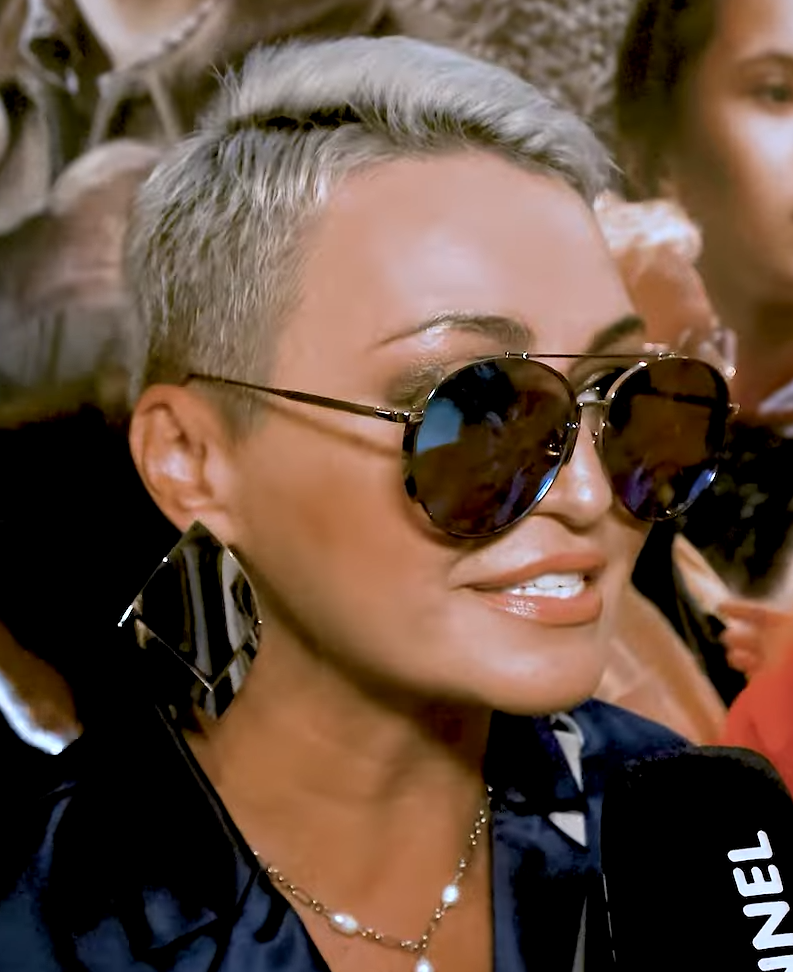
- Lel in September 2024
- Born: Yekaterina Nikolayevna Chuprinina; 20 September 1974 (age 51); Nalchik, RSFSR, Soviet Union
- Musical career
- Genres: Pop; dance; chanson
- Occupations: Singer; composer
- Years active: 1994–present
- Website: klel.ru

Yekaterina Nikolayevna Chuprinina (Russian: Екатерина Николаевна Чупринина; born 20 September 1974), known by her stage name Katya Lel (Катя Лель), is a Russian pop singer.

== Early life and education ==
Chuprinina was born on September 20, 1974, in Nalchik, Kabardino-Balkar Autonomous Soviet Socialist Republic (now the Kabardino-Balkaria Republic), where she grew up. She has an older sister, Irina. Her mother was an engineer; her father was a master of sports in cycling.

When she was 3 years old, her father bought her a piano. At age 7, she began studying music at Children's Art School. She then continued her education at the North Caucasus Institute of Arts. While still a student, Katya Lel spent six years as a soloist in the "Nalchik" vocal and instrumental ensemble at the city's House of Culture.

In 1994, she enrolled at the Gnessin Russian Academy of Music's vocal department in Moscow. There, her teachers were Joseph Kobzon and Lev Leshchenko. She won the "Musical Start - 1994" competition. After giving Leshchenko a demo tape of her songs, she was offered a job and began working at the Lev Leshchenko Theater.

In 1998, she graduated from the academy with top honors.

== Career ==
In 1998, following her graduation, she started a solo career, releasing Champs Elysee.

In 2000, she chose the stage name Katya Lel and officially changed her name; the surname was borrowed from a character in Rimsky-Korsakov's opera "The Snow Maiden" - a shepherdess named Lel, personifying spring and love.

In 2003, she began to work with producer Maxim Fadeev.

In February 2003, she released Moy Marmeladny (Мой Мармеладный). In November 2023, a sped-up version of the song became a viral video on TikTok; people dressed in fur clothing and hats with earflaps while lip synching the song.

== Personal life ==
In 1996, 22-year-old Lel met 46-year-old businessman and restaurateur Alexander Volkov in Lev Leshchenko's dressing room. They began an eight-year romance which was never formalized as Volkov was married.

From 2008 to 2023, Katya Lel was married to businessman Igor Kuznetsov. They have a daughter, Emilia.

Lel says she will only marry again if the man is under 35 years old.

Lel has stated that she has been abducted by aliens and has paranormal abilities. She also believes that in a past life, she was the son of Ramses II and lived in Egypt.

Lel has supported the Russo-Ukrainian war and has performed for Russian troops in the battlefield.

== Awards ==
In 2025, she was named a Merited Artist of the Russian Federation.

== Discography ==
=== Studio albums ===
- Yeliseyskiye polya (1998)
- Talisman (1999)
- Sama (2000)
- Mezhdu nami (2002)
- Dzhaga-dzhaga (2004)
- Kruchu-verchu (2005)
- Ya tvoya (2008)
- Solntse lyubvi (2013)
- Moya tema (2019)
- Siyaniye (2020)
