= Strannik moy =

Studio album by Irina Allegrova
- Released: 1992
- Genre: Pop
- Language: Russian
- Label: ZeKo
- Producer: Igor Nikolayev

Irina Allegrova chronology
Strannik moy (1992)	Suzheny moy... (1994)

Strannik moy (Russian: Странник мой; transl. My wanderer) is the debut solo studio album by Russian singer Irina Allegrova released in 1992 through ZeKo Records.

== Overview ==
The words and music of almost all the songs in the album belong to Igor Nikolayev.

The album was a great success. Several songs from the album were included in the final hit parade Zvukovaya dorozhka of the newspaper Moskovskij Komsomolets for 1991: "Fotografiya 9х12" took fourth place, "Ne bylo pechali" – sixth, "Strannik moy" – ninth, and Allegrova herself was recognized by readers as the best singer of the year. The song "Strannik moy" also became the winner of the Pesnya goda diploma. The composition "Moy laskovy i nezhny zver" was performed by the singer back in the days of her participation in the band Electroclub, it also took part in the selection for Pesnya goda–90, but did not make it to the finals.

With this program, Allegrova gave five sold-out concerts in three days at the Olympic Stadium in 1992 under the title "Don't Fly Away, Love".Subsequently, the songs "Fotografiya 9х12" and "Strannik moy" became considered the artist's signature songs and classics of Russian pop music.

== Critical reception ==
The columnist of the magazine Krugozor Tatyana Tyurina wrote: "Her heroine is a beautiful, smart, modern woman who knows how to love and wants to be loved. We listen to Allegrova's songs, and it seems that this is a confession about herself, about happy or not so happy love, about doubts and hopes. The singer finds her own timbre, new colors for the performance of each song. And what is interesting: no matter how big the hall is, but when Irina Allegrova comes on stage and her songs begin to sound, it seems as if the walls narrow and that trusting atmosphere is created, giving birth to an extraordinary silence, in which everyone seems to be alone with themselves".

== Track listing ==
All tracks are written by Igor Nikolayev, except where noted

LP edition
No.	Title	Writer(s)	Length
1.	"Kak ya soskuchilas"		4:11
2.	"Strannik moy"		3:06
3.	"Glupy malchishka"		3:45
4.	"Ne bylo pechali"		4:53
5.	"Moy laskovy i nezhny zver"	Sergey Sigarev; Nikolayev	4:05
6.	"Verte v lyubov, devchonki"		2:41
7.	"Fotografiya 9х12"		3:25
8.	"Ne uletay, lyubov!"		4:05
Total length:			30:11

Compact cassette edition
No.	Title	Writer(s)	Length
1.	"Kak ya soskuchilas"		4:11
2.	"Strannik moy"		3:06
3.	"Glupy malchishka"		3:45
4.	"Ne bylo pechali"		4:53
5.	"Svechka, svechechka, svecha"		3:57
6.	"Mladshy leytenant"		3:45
7.	"Igrushka"	Pavel Zhagun; Nikolayev	3:51
8.	"Moy laskovy i nezhny zver"	Sigarev; Nikolayev	4:05
9.	"Verte v lyubov, devchonki"		2:41
10.	"Fotografiya 9х12"		3:25
11.	"Ne uletay, lyubov!"		4:05
12.	"Tranzit"	Larisa Rubalskaya; Viktor Chaika	4:06
13.	"Babnik"	Simon Osiashvili; Chaika	3:34
Total length:			49:24

== Personnel ==
- Irina Allegrova – vocals
- Igor Nikolayev – arrangement, keyboards, computer
- Igor Piskaryov, Segey Pavlov – photography, design

Credits are adapted from the album's liner notes.
