= Vsyo snachala =

2001 studio album by Irina Allegrova

Studio album by Irina Allegrova
- Released: February 12, 2001
- Genre: Pop
- Language: Russian
- Label: JRC

Irina Allegrova chronology
Treatr (1999)	Vsyo snachala (2001)	Po lezviyu Lyubvi

Professional ratings
Review scores
Source	Rating
InterMedia	unrated

Vsyo snachala (Russian: Всё сначала; transl. All again) is the eighth studio album by Russian singer Irina Allegrova released in 2001.

Unlike previous albums, this one contains songs from different authors. Also on the record you can find two duets: with daughter Lala (the song "Mama") and with Igor Nikolaev (the song "Staryy znakomiy"). There are two cover versions on the album: the song "Smyateniye" by David Tukhmanov and "Nezhnost" by Alexandra Pakhmutova.

Video clips were shot for the songs "Bez viny vinovataya" and "Vsyo normalno", directed by Irina Mironova.

In the final of the program "Pesnya goda 2001" the singer presented two songs: "Mama" (solo version) and "Akkordeon", also in the qualifying round Irina performed the song "Bez viny vinovataya".

== Track listing ==
Vsyo snachala – Standart edition
No.	Title	Lyrics	Music	Length
1.	"Без вины виновата я" ("Bez viny vinovataya")	Alexandr Shevchenko	Alexandr Shevchenko	3:08
2.	"Аккордеон" ("Akkordeon")	Sergey Sokolkin	Arkady Ukupnik	3:49
3.	"Всё нормально" ("Vsyo normalno")	Alexandr Lukyanov	Alexandr Lukyanov	3:56
4.	"Александрит от Александра" ("Alexandrit on Alexandra")	Yevgeniy Muravyov; Lyudmila Fomina	Arkady Ukupnik	3:43
5.	"Нечаянная радость" ("Nechayannaya radost")	Mikhail Balakirev	Mikhail Balakirev	5:06
6.	"Смятение" ("Smyateniye")	Anna Akhmatova	David Tukhmanov	3:25
7.	"Нежность" ("Nezhnost")	Nikolai Dobronravov; Sergey Grebennikov	Aleksandra Pakhmutova	3:06
8.	"Холодно" ("Kholodno")	Regina Lisits	Igor Azarov	3:26
9.	"Треснувший диск" ("Tresnuvshiy disk")	Simon Osiashvili	Yevgeniy Kobylyanskiy	4:19
10.	"Дикая волчица" ("Dikaya volchitsa")	Aleksandr Vulykh	Oleg Sorokin	5:10
11.	"Канарейка" ("Kanareyka")	Regina Lisits	Igor Azarov	2:57
12.	"Обалденные глаза" ("Obaldennye glaza")	Sergey Sokolkin	Alexandr Lukyanov	3:18
13.	"Старый знакомый" (duet with Igor Nikolaev) ("Staryy znakomiy")	Igor Nikolaev	Igor Nikolaev	4:16
14.	"Мама" (duet with Lala Allegrova) ("Mama")	Yuriy Garin	Alexey Garnizov	5:10
15.	"Всё сначала" ("Vsyo snachala")	Yuliya Starostina	Yuliya Donskaya	5:21
16.	"Странник" (New version) ("Strannik")	Igor Nikolaev	Igor Nikolaev	3:27

Vsyo snachala – Re released edition (bonus tracks)
No.	Title	Lyrics	Music	Length
1.	"Океан любви" ("Okean lyubvi")	Yuriy Garin	Alexey Garnizov	4:44
2.	"Младший лейтенант" (Remix) ("Mladshiy leytenant")	Igor Nikolaev	Igor Nikolaev	3:40
3.	"Фотография 9х12" (Remix) ("Fotogafiya 9х12")	Igor Nikolaev	Igor Nikolaev	3:22
4.	"Угонщица" (Karaoke) ("Ugonshchica")	Larisa Rubalskaya	Viktor Chaika	4:05
