= Vladimir Migulya =

Russian composer (1945–1996)

- Владимир Мигуля
- Born: 18 August 1945; Stalingrad, Soviet Union
- Died: 16 February 1996 (aged 50); Moscow, Russia
- Resting place: Vagankovo Cemetery, Moscow; 55°46′05″N 37°32′54″E
- Occupations: composer, singer

Vladimir Georgievich Migulya (Russian: Владимир Георгиевич Мигуля; 18 August 1945 – 16 February 1996) was a Soviet and Russian musician, singer and composer. He authored many popular songs in the 1970s and the 1990s. He collaborated with the group Zemlyane. In 1988 he was named Honored Artist of the RSFSR Migulya wrote the music of the first Hymn of Cosmonautics of Russia Grass by the Home. He was a 14-times laureate of the festival Pesnya Goda.

== Biography ==
Vladimir Migulya was born on 18 August 1945 in Stalingrad (today's Volgograd). His father Georgy Fyodorovich Migulya was a military pilot, while his mother Lyudmila Aleksandrovna was a medical statistician and lieutenant of medical service during the World War II. He graduated from a music school in Volgograd. From 1965 to 1968, Migulya studied at the Volgograd School of Arts at the Department of Music Theory.

In 1963 he entered the Volgograd State Medical University. In 1968 he graduated from both educational institutions and entered the Leningrad State Conservatory (composition class of Sergei Slonimsky). After graduating from the conservatoire, in 1974 he moved to Moscow.

Migulya collaborated with Simon Osiashvili and Larisa Rubalskaya. Vladimir Migulya's songs are included in the repertoire of Valentina Tolkunova, Sofia Rotaru, Mikhail Boyarsky, Valery Obodzinsky, Yevgeny Golovin, Aleksandr Mikhailov, Zemlyane, Samotsvety, VIA Plamya and other performers.

Migulya survived an apparent assassination attempt on April 7, 1994, when his car was blown up. He remained miraculously alive suffering only concussions, while his personal driver Eduard Popenkov died on the spot with both legs torn off.

Even before the attempt, Vladimir Migulya was diagnosed with amyotrophic lateral sclerosis, but the stress experienced accelerated the course of the disease. Despite this, bed-tied, he wrote about 20 songs, mostly on the verses of Aleksandra Ochirova.

Migulya died on the morning of 16 February 1996, at the age of 50. He was survived by wife Marina and two daughters.
