= Suzheny moy... =

Studio album by Irina Allegrova
- Released: October 1994
- Recorded: 1989–1994
- Genre: Pop music
- Language: Russian
- Label: Russkoye snabzheniye
- Producer: Igor Nikolayev

Irina Allegrova chronology
Strannik moy (1992)	Suzheny moy... (1994)	Ugonshchitsa (1994)

Suzheny moy... (Russian: Суженый мой...; transl. My intended...) is a second solo studio album by Russian singer Irina Allegrova released in 2003 by Russkoye snabzheniye.

== Overview ==
In fact, the album is a reissue of the singer's debut album Strannik moy with the addition of new songs. The author of most of the songs on the album is Igor Nikolayev. The album also features songs by Viktor Chaika — "Babnik" and "Tranzit". The song "Igrushka" was performed by Allegrova back in the days when she was part of the band Elektroklub.

The album was released in 1994 through the label Russkoye snabzheniye (RS-94015) on compact discs. In the same year, the next studio album was released, and soon a collection of the best songs was released with the title Suzheny moy... through Soyuz Studio. Most of the songs on the album became big hits and were included in the "golden fund" of Irina Allegrova's songs.

In 2021, the album was re-released by the Warner Music Russia label in digital format, the track list of the album was not changed, but remakes took the place of the original versions of some songs.

== Critical reception ==
Professional ratings
Review scores
Source	Rating
InterMedia	7/10

Alexey Mazhayev from InterMedia called the album a "hit" and "moderately heartbreaking", and the songs are "very interesting examples from the point of view of studying the psychology of lyrical heroines".

== Track listing ==
No.	Title	Lyrics	Music	Length
1.	"Ne uletay lyubov"	Igor Nikolayev	Igor Nikolayev	4:06
2.	"Moy laskovy i nezhny zver"	Sergey Sigarev	Igor Nikolayev	4:05
3.	"Verte v lyubov devchonki"	Igor Nikolayev	Igor Nikolayev	2:37
4.	"Igrushka"	Pavel Zhagun	Igor Nikolayev	3:53
5.	"Svechka"	Igor Nikolayev	Igor Nikolayev	4:00
6.	"Kak ya soskuchilas"	Igor Nikolayev	Igor Nikolayev	4:12
7.	"Suzheny moy"	Igor Kokhanovsky	Igor Nikolayev	3:33
8.	"Babnik"	Simon Osiashvili	Viktor Chaika	3:56
9.	"Ne bylo bechali"	Igor Nikolayev	Igor Nikolayev	4:55
10.	"Glupy malchik"	Igor Nikolayev	Igor Nikolayev	3:43
11.	"Strannik"	Igor Nikolayev	Igor Nikolayev	3:08
12.	"Fotografiya"	Igor Nikolayev	Igor Nikolayev	3:26
13.	"Mladsiy leytenant"	Igor Nikolayev	Igor Nikolayev	3:45
14.	"Tranzit"	Larisa Rubalskaya	Viktor Chaika	4:05
Total length:				52:00

== Release history ==
Region	Date	Format(s)	Label	Ref.
Russia	October 1994	CD; cassette	Russkoye snabzheniye	
Russia	2002	CD	Jeff Music; Russkoye snabzheniye	
Ukraine	2002	CD	Russkoye snabzheniye	
Various	21 November 2018	Digital download; streaming	Digital Project	
Various	9 April 2021	Digital download; streaming	Warner Music Russia	
