= Larisa Rubalskaya =

Russian poet (born 1945)

- Лариса Рубальская
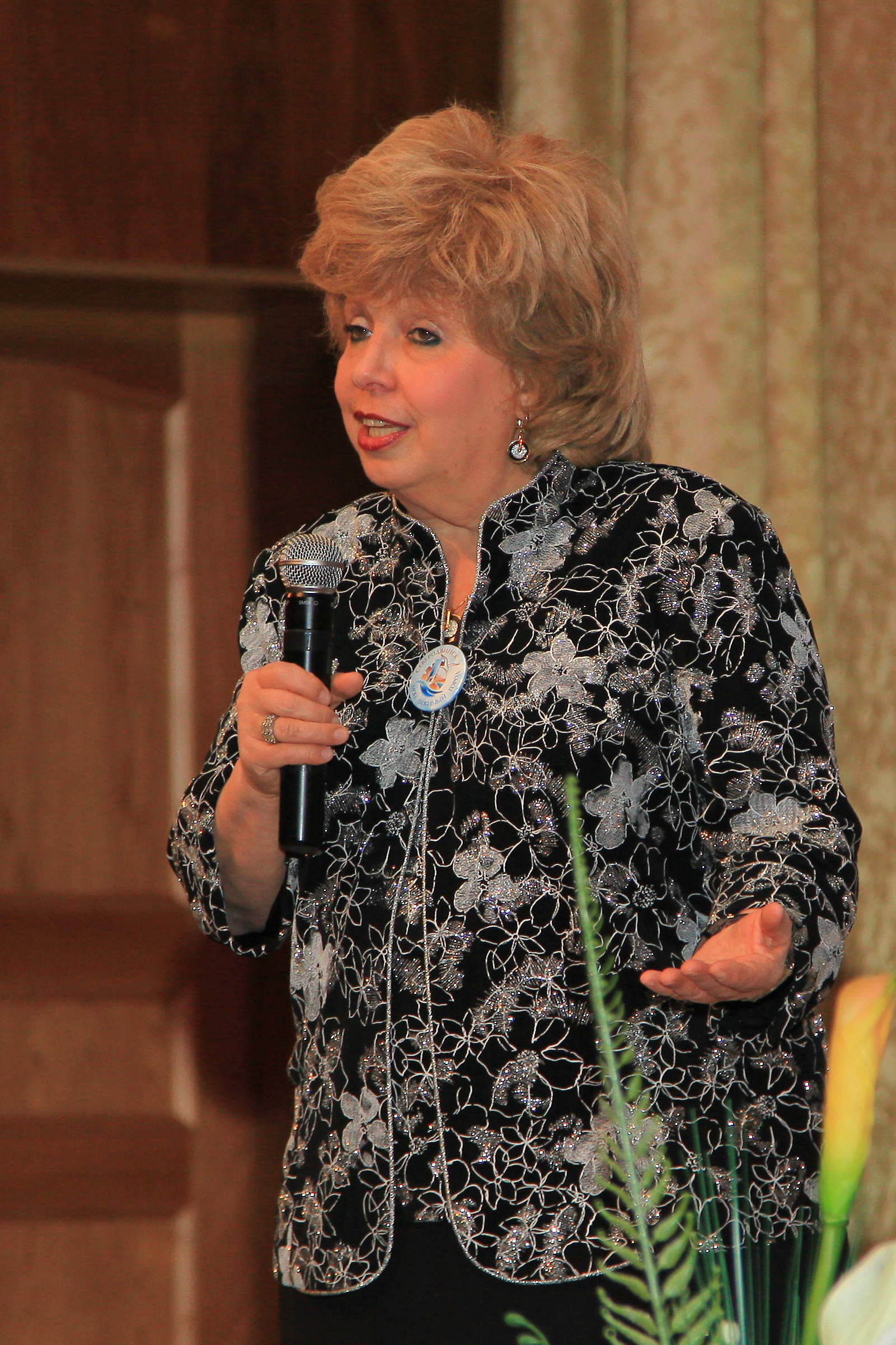
- Rubalskaya in 2012
- Born: 24 September 1945 (age 80); Moscow, Russian SFSR, Soviet Union
- Education: Krupskaya Moscow Regional Pedagogical Institute
- Occupations: Writer, poet, translator
- Years active: 1948-1999
- Awards: People's Artist of Russia; Medal "For Work in Culture and Art"

Larisa Alexeyevna Rubalskaya (Russian: Лариса Алексеевна Рубальская; born September 24, 1945, Moscow) is a Russian writer, poet and translator, and a member of the Moscow Writers' Union.

== Art song ==
The first song Larissa Rubalskaya wrote together with Vladimir Migulya – Memoirs, Valentina Tolkunova. Since 1984, the winner of the TV contest Song of the Year.

Rubalskaya is a songwriter who sang Alla Pugacheva – My Destiny, Daughter, Live peacefully, the country), Filipp Kirkorov – I'm guilty, guilty, Mikhail Muromov - Strange Woman, Irina Allegrova – A passenger in transit, Ugonschitsa, Tatiana Ovsienko – Morozov, Alsou - The light in your window, Iosif Kobzon - Blue Envelope.

In 1991 and 1993 Larissa Rubalskaya conducted creative evenings at the Theatre of Variety. In 1995 she held a jubilee recital of a poem in the concert hall "Russia".

Larisa Rubalskaya collaborates with composers David Tukhmanov, Vyacheslav Dobrynin, Aleksandr Klevitsky, Arkady Ukupnik, Mark Minkov, and others. Takes part in many TV shows ("Good luck", "Subject", "Show files", "Morning Post", "To the Barrier"), maintains an active concert schedule, participates in the jury song contests.

== Artworks ==
- "The map I lay down"
- "Recipes for an encore, 2007
- "Translate hours ago," a collection of poems, 2003
- "Winning", a story
- "Snacks and hot for our golden husbands!", 2007
- "Vain words", 2003
- "Ring the hot hand", a collection of poems, 2004
- The cycle of "I'm sorry Ivanov, consists of 23 pieces.
- Cycle "Everything was as expected."
- The cycle of "Night of shattered".
- Cycle "you say – leave helpful ...".
- Cycle, "Who teaches the birds to find the way?"
- The cycle of "I myself do not understand."
- "His Majesty Salad."
