= Electroclub =

Musical band

Электроклуб Electroclub
- Origin: Leningrad, Russia
- Genres: electropop, synthpop, pop, hi-NRG
- Years active: 1985–1993
- Past members: Viktor Saltykov (1987–1990); Igor Talkov (1986–1987); Irina Allegrova (1986–1990); Raisa Saed-Shakh (1986); Alexander Nazarov (1987—1993)

Electroclub (Russian: Электроклуб) was a Soviet and Russian electropop group founded in 1986.

== History ==
Group "Electroclub" was active from 1985 till 1993. Musical director — Vladimir Dubovitskiy. Composer — David Tukhmanov. Group was founded and based on "Flames of Moscow" (Russian: Огни Москвы "Ogni Moskvy") Oscar Feltsman with musician Irina Allegrova, who has musical experience.

In 1986 from Ludmila Senchina's group has come singer and composer Igor Talkov. He was the ideologist of the group and the author of musical concept. The main song he had popular success with was "Clean Pounds" (Russian: Чистые пруды "Chistye Prudy"). In 1987 the Talkov's song "Three Letters" (Russian: Три письма "Tri Pisma") was awarded with "Golden tuning fork" (Russian: Чистые пруды "Zolotoy kamerton") and gained a phonograph record of their songs.

After their first phonograph record Igor Talkov left the group and Tukhmanov has decided to invite vocal leader of the "Forum" (Russian: Форум) band. After this invitation group has decided to work on the new album in November, 1987. The quality of sound was worse than the first album and the phonogram record was a commercial failure. From the "Forum" band had invited Lazar Anastasiadi, Alexander Nazarov, Viktor Saltykov, Alexander Dronik.

Unexpectedly, singer Raisa Saed-Shakh which has come from Vladimir Migulya's "Monitor" (Russian: Монитор), had left the group. Tukhmanov had written Saed-Shakh's "Gusi-Gusi" (Russian: Гуси-гуси), "Malenkaya Zima" (Russian: Маленькая зима), "Ballada o ledyanom dome" (Russian: Баллада о ледяном доме) songs and the Talkov's "Telegrafistka" (Russian: Телеграфистка) song but this songs weren't save. Dubovitskiy and Allegrova planned to drop Saed-Shakh from the group.

The basis of group were David Tukhmanov songs but also was songs of other authors especially Igor Talkov's and Igor Nikolaev's songs. The interest of the group had lost. Irina Allegrova worked with group till the middle of 1990 and then she has begun a solo career with Igor Nikolaev (She had divorced with her husband Dubovitskiy in 1992). The "Electroclub-2" (Russian: Электроклуб-2) phonograph record was released in 1989.

Viktor Saltykov has left the group and has returned to his first wife Irina Saltykova to St. Petersburg in 1990. Guitar player Vladimir Kulakovskiy has found "Kupe" (Russian: Купе) band that year. With Nazarov the group has released one more album "White Panther" (Russian: Белая пантера) and several music videos but hasn't gain any popularity. The group was dissolved in 1993. After the Tukhmanov's departure Alexander Nazarov has become the group director and has recorded several albums. Nazarov with Viktor Saltykov and Vasiliy Savchenko have short reunion in 1999. The record of the "Zhizn-doroga" (Russian: Жизнь — дорога) song was saved and was shown in «Песня-93».

The later years Nazarov has tried to reunite the group and invite woman singers but this did not happen.

== Participants in "Pesnya Goda" ==
- 1986 — Irina Allegrova — "Old mirror" (Russian: Старое зеркало "Staroye Zerkalo")
- 1988 — Irina Allegrova — "Dark horse" (Russian: Тёмная лошадка "Tyomnaya Loshadka" (preliminary round)), Viktor Saltykov — "Don't Allow Him to Marry You" (Russian: Ты замуж за него не выходи "Ty zamuzh za nyego ne vykhodi")
- 1989 — Irina Allegrova — "Toy" (Russian: Игрушка "Igrushka"), Viktor Saltykov — "I don't forgive you" (Russian: Я тебя не прощу "Ya tebya ne proshchu")
- 1990 — Irina Allegrova — "My honey man" (Russian: Мой ласковый и нежный зверь "Moy laskovy i nezhny zver"), Viktor Saltykov — "Mom's daughter" (Russian: Маменькина дочка "Mamenkina Dochka")
- 1993 — Alexander Nazarov — "Road of life" (Russian: Жизнь-дорога "Zhizn-doroga")
- 1999 — Viktor Saltykov — "Horse in apples" (Russian: Кони в яблоках "Koni v yabolkakh")

=== Squad ===
- Vladimir Dubovitskiy
- Viktor Saltykov (1987—1990)
- Alexander Nazarov (1987—1993)
- Vladimir Kulakovskiy
- Alexander Dronik
- Mikhail Palyey
- Pavel Nazarov
- Igor Talkov (1986—1987)
- Raisa Saed-Shakh (1986)
- Irina Allegrova (1986—1990)
- Vladimir Samoshin (1988)
- Vasiliy Savchenko (1991—1993)
- Alexander Pimonov (1991)

== Discography ==
- 1986 — "Happy Birthday" (Russian: День рождения "Den Rozhdeniya") (EP)
- 1987 — "David Tukhmanov, Electroclub group" (Russian: Давид Тухманов, группа «Электроклуб» "David Tukhmanov, gruppa Electroklub") (LP)
- 1987 — "The memorial photo" (Russian: Фото на память "Foto na pamyat") (MC)
- 1989 — "Electroclub-2" (Russian: Электроклуб-2 "Electroklub-2") (LP)
- 1990 — "Toy" (Russian: Игрушка "Igrushka") (МС)
- 1991 — "Mom's daughter" (Russian: Маменькина дочка "Mamenkina Dochka") (МС)
- 1993 — "White Panther" (Russian: Белая пантера "Belaya Pantera") (LP) (recorded in 1991)

== Awards ==
- 1987 — "Golden tunig fork" (Russian: Золотой камертон "Zolotoy kamerton").
- 1988 — "Musical Olimp" (Russian: Музыкальный олимп "Muzykalny Olimp") best songs: «Ты замуж за него не выходи» (4th place), «Кони в яблоках» (8th place).
- 1989 — best second musical group in newspaper "Moskovskij Komsomolets" («Московский комсомолец») (in topic «Звуковая дорожка»).

=== Video ===
- Нервы, нервы, нервы («Новогодний огонёк», 31.12.1986)
- Видеотека («Утренняя почта», весна 1987)
- Ты замуж за него не выходи («Новогодний огонёк», 1987)
- Тёмная лошадка («Новогодний огонёк», 1987)
- Дай мне слово («Утренняя почта», 1988)
- Кони в яблоках («Утренняя почта», 1988)
- Remember Moscow (1988)
- Схожу с ума («Взгляд», 1989)
- Последнее свидание («Утренняя почта», 1989)
- Ворожея («Утренняя почта», 1989)
- Игрушка (1989)
- Глупый мальчишка (1989)
- Я тебя не прощу (1989)
- Маменькина дочка («Песня года», 1990)
- Белая пантера (1991)
- Школьница (1991)
- Садовая скамейка (1991)
- Дело в шляпе
- Незаметная девчонка
- Ну, что же ты
- Полчаса («50/50»)
- Синяя роза
- Эх, ты, эх, я...
- Верни мне прошлое, скрипач (1992)
- Дальняя дорога (Ночь-распутница)
- Танечка-Танюша («Утренняя звезда», 1993)
- Научи меня любить
