= Grass by the Home =

1983 song by Zemlyane

Zemlyane performing Grass by the Home in 2006 (starts at 7:40)

Grass by the Home (Russian: Трава у дома, romanized: Trava u doma) is a 1983 song by former Soviet and Russian music group Zemlyane. The lyrics were written by Anatoly Poperechny and music by Vladimir Migulya. The song tells about cosmonauts in space, longing for Earth, along with their homes and the grass.

== History of creation ==
The original poem, which was later adapted into the lyrics of the song, had the same title — "Grass [by the] Home", and was written about longing for one's parents' home, in particular, it featured such images as "grass", "shed", and "cow's eyes". In this first version of the poem, cosmonauts were not mentioned or meant. In a discussion between Vladimir Migulya, who decided to write a song for Cosmonautics Day in 1982, and the poet Anatoly Poperechny, it was decided to choose and adapt this particular poem. Later, the song became the anthem of Soviet cosmonauts.

== Usage and variations ==
In 2009, the Russian Federal Space Agency named "Grass by the Home" the official anthem of Russian cosmonauts.

The song was the finalist of the 1983 edition of Song of the Year. In 1984, it was used in the 14th episode of Well, Just You Wait! (Nu, pogodi!).

On 31 May 2020, the day of the first launch of the SpaceX crewed spacecraft, a modified video of the Zemlyane group and a deepfake Elon Musk with the song "Grass by the Home" became a hit in the Russian segment of the Internet. In an interview with the Moskva Speaks radio station, Sergei Skachkov spoke positively about the video and wished “everyone sang the song: the Chinese, the Japanese".

In April 2020, the unregistered Russian political party VKPB announced the translation of the song "Grass by the Home" into Japanese. On 14 April 2021 a Yiddish translation of the song was published in the Russian newspaper Birobidzhaner Stern. The Internet version of the article is accompanied by a link to a video with the translation of the song and also contains a literary translation into English.

A modernized remix of the song was included on the original soundtrack of the 2023 science-fiction game Atomic Heart, alongside other well-known Soviet-era songs.
