= Angelina Vovk =

Russian television presenter

Angelina Vovk PAR
- Ангелина Вовк
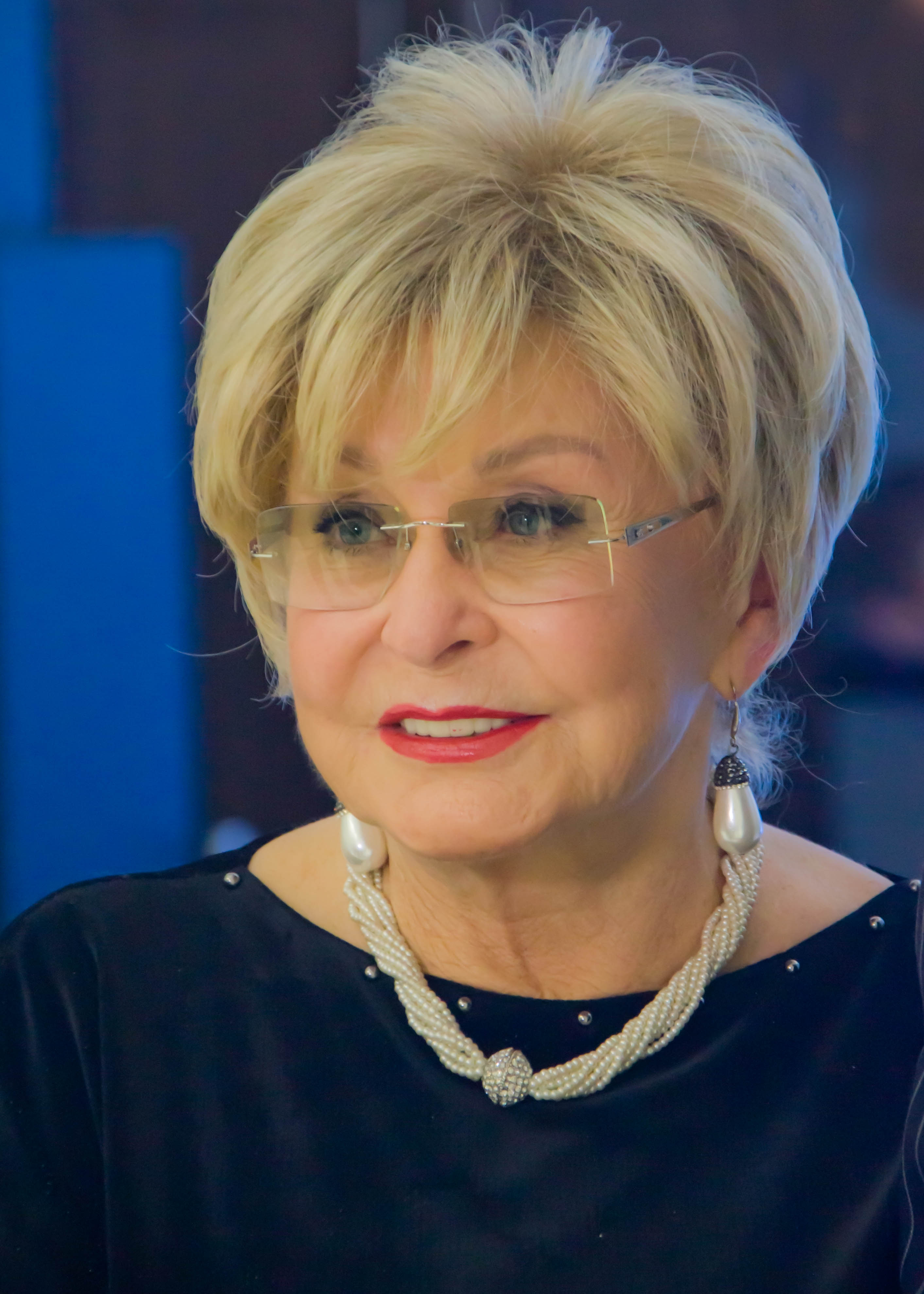
- Vovk in 2019
- Born: 16 September 1942 (age 84); Tulun, Irkutsk Oblast, Russian SFSR, USSR
- Education: Russian Academy of Theatre Arts
- Spouses: Gennady Chertov (divorced) Jindrich Götz (divorced)
- Parent(s): Mikhail; Maria

Angelina Mikhaylovna Vovk (Russian: Ангели́на Миха́йловна Вовк, IPA: [ɐnɡʲɪˈlʲinə mʲɪˈxajləvnə ˈvofk]; born September 16, 1942) is a former presenter for the Soviet Central Television active from 1980, best known for years on Good Night, Little Ones! and Pesnya goda. She was awarded People's Artist of the Russian Federation (2006).
