= Viktor Saltykov =

Russian singer (born 1957)

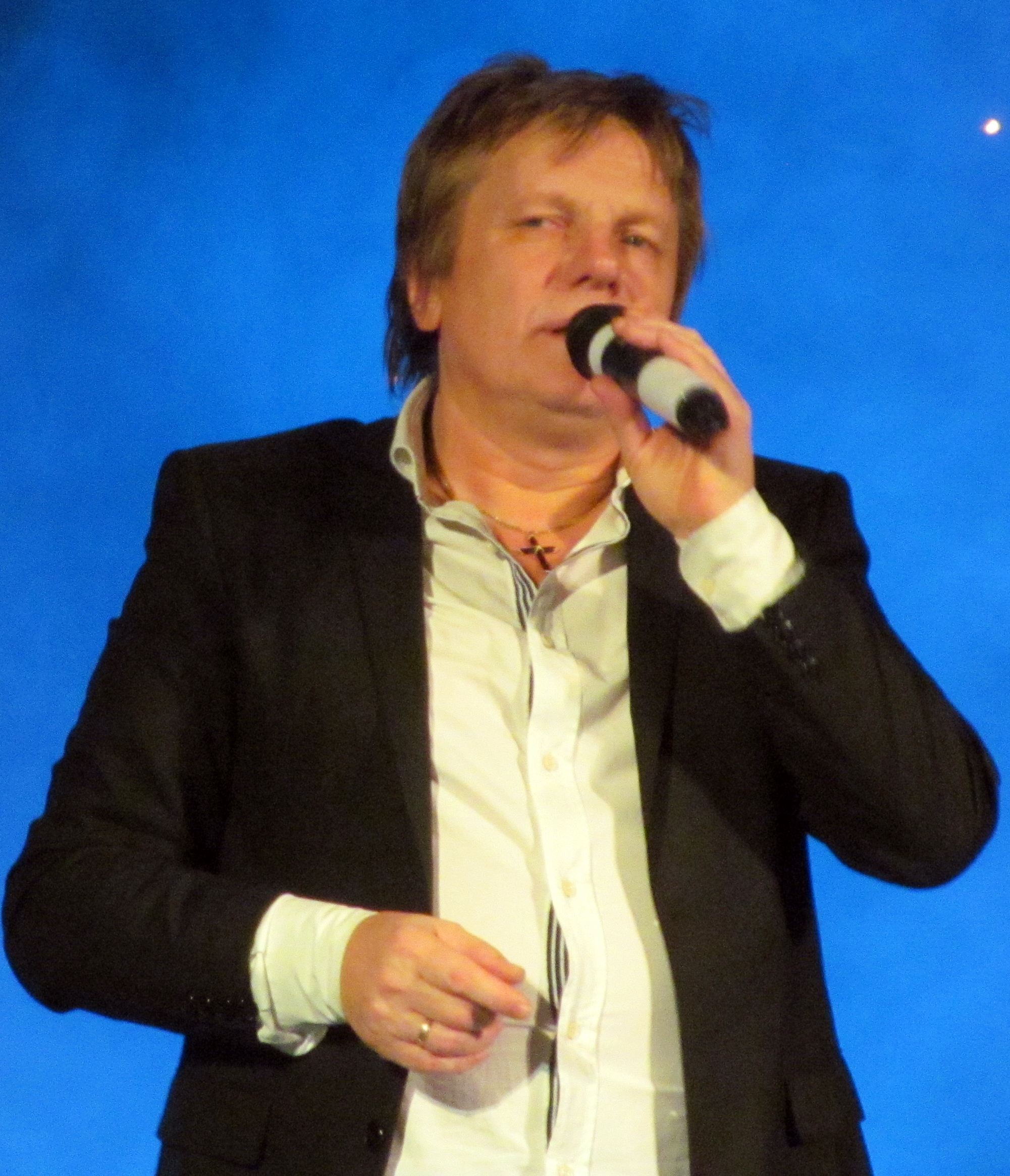
- in 2016

Background information
- Born: Viktor Vladimirovich Saltykov; November 22, 1957 (age 68); Leningrad, Russian SFSR, Soviet Union
- Genres: Pop; rock; dance
- Occupation: Singer
- Instrument: Vocals
- Years active: 1983–present
- Website: vsaltykov.com

Viktor Vladimirovich Saltykov (Russian: Ви́ктор Влади́мирович Салтыко́в, IPA: [ˈvʲiktər vlɐˈdʲimʲɪrəvʲɪtɕ səltɨˈkof]; born November 22, 1957) is a Soviet and Russian singer. He is known as a solo artist, as well as the singer with the bands Manufaktura (band), Forum and Electroclub.

== Biography ==
In 1977–1979, while serving in the Soviet Army in the German Democratic Republic (Group of Soviet Forces in Germany), Saltykov played and sang in an army band.

After the army he enrolled into the Petersburg State Transport University, graduating in 1985 with a degree in electrical engineering.

In 1983, Viktor Saltykov with the rock band Manufaktura took part in the first Leningrad Rock Festival and won the Grand Prix of the festival as the best singer. He moved to the Forum group in 1984. It is with Forum that Viktor performed his most famous songs (White Night, Little Island, Uleteli listya). In 1987, Saltykov joined the Electroclub group.

Since 1990, as a solo artist, Saltykov released four studio albums; his old material has been re-released in numerous compilations.

== Family ==
- First wife singer Irina Saltykova (1966)
  - Daughter Alisa (1987)
- Second wife Irina Metlina
  - Daughter Anna (1995)
  - Son Svyatoslav (2008)
