= Oleg Mityaev =

Russian bard, musician and actor (born 1956)

Oleg Mityaev Олег Митяев
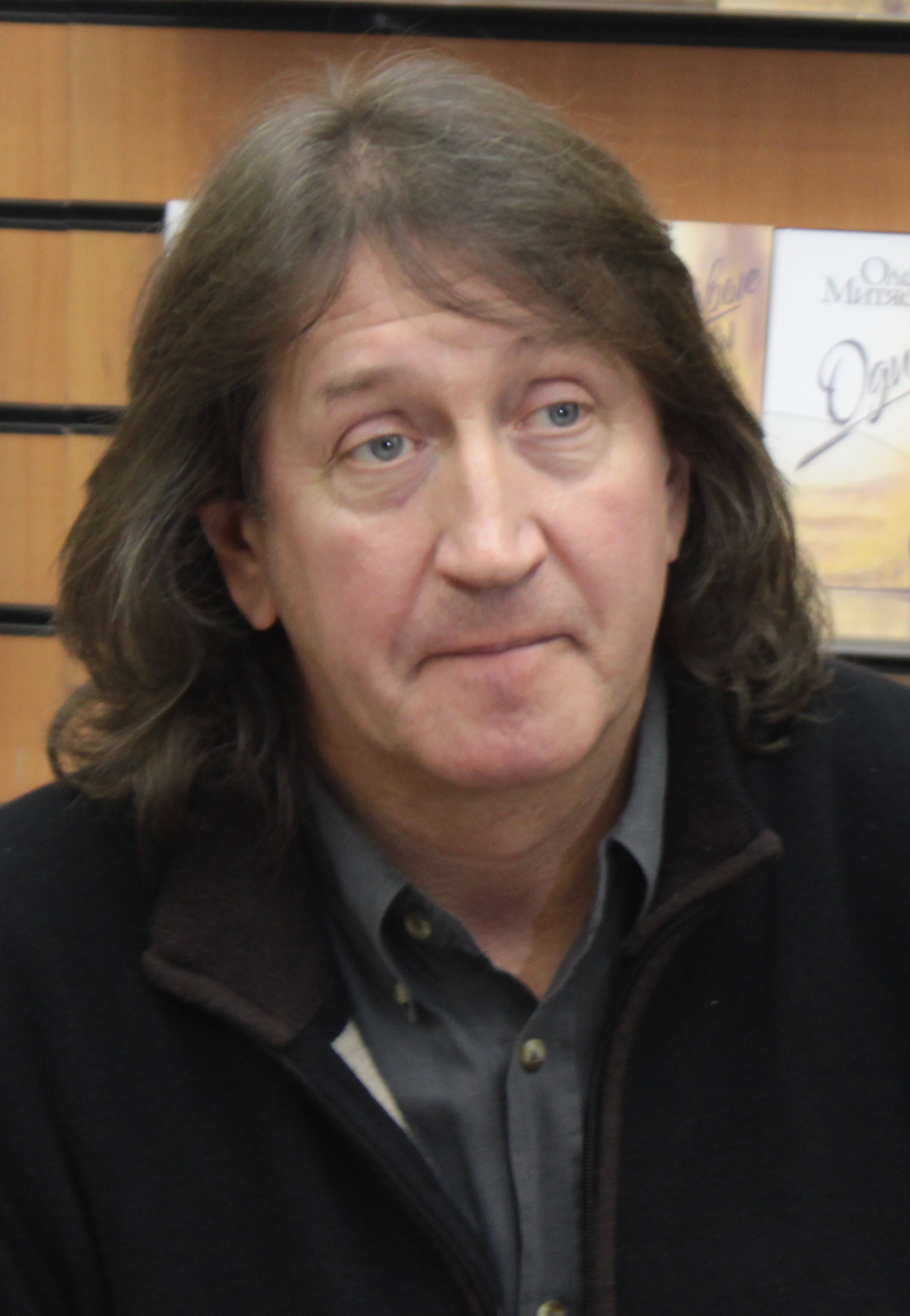
- Mityaev in 2009

Background information
- Born: Oleg Grigorievich Mityaev; February 19, 1956 (age 70)
- Origin: Chelyabinsk, USSR
- Genres: Bard
- Occupations: Musician, singer-songwriter, actor
- Instruments: Vocals, guitar
- Years active: 1978–present
- Website: mityaev.ru

Oleg Grigorievich Mityaev (Russian: Олег Григорьевич Митяев; born 19 February 1956) is a Russian bard, musician and actor.

He was awarded the People's Artist of Russia award in 2009. He is also a member of Russian Writers Union.

Mityaev is the author and first performer of the popular bard song So Good That All We... (1978).

== Discography ==
- 1990 – Let's Talk Together
- 1992 – Now They Speak About Money, songs of Yuri Vizbor
- 1994 – The Letter from Africa
- 1995 – Bright Past
- 1996 – Summer is a Little Life
- 1998 – Brave, People, Summer Will Come Soon!
- 1999 – Best Songs
- 2000 – Not Best Songs
- 2002 – Neither Country, Not Churchyard..., lyrics by Joseph Brodsky
- 2002 – Celestial Calculator or Lives of Wonderful People
- 2003 – Concert in Kremlin, 2 CD
- 2005 – Let's Talk Together! 25 Years Later
- 2005 – The Smell of Snow
- 2006 – Songs of Mityaev, in two parts
- 2007 – Brave, People, Summer Will Come Soon!, re-issue
- 2007 – Oleg Mityaev visiting Eldar Ryazanov, 2 CD
- 2008 – New Collection. Best Songs of Oleg Mityaev
- 2008 – There Will Be No Romance Anymore, CD+DVD
- 2009 – Long Live Muse!, CD+DVD, lyrics by Alexandr Pushkin, music by David Tukhmanov
- 2011 – Songs of Mityaev, the third part
- 2011 – The Forgotten Feeling

== Songbooks ==
- 1992– Let's Talk Together. Songs by Oleg Mityaev
- 1997– Songs
- 2000 – Songs
- 2000– Ferial Things
- 2001– Herbalist
- 2003– Bright Past: Lyrics with Music Sheets Application
- 2003– Eternal Story: Lyrics with Music Sheets Application
- 2004– Let's Talk Together: Verses, Songs
- 2004– Summeris a little life: Verses and Songs
- 2005– Songs 2
- 2006– Songs
- 2009– Celestial Calculator
- 2009– Same Dreams
- 2009– Verses about Love
- 2010– Veins on Hardwood Arms

== Videography ==
=== Films ===
- Two Hours with Bards (1987)
- Playing with Unknown (1988)
- Safari No.6 (1990)
- Killer (1990)
- Monologues on the Red Brick Background, or 20 Years Later (2007)

=== Live recordings ===
- 1998– So Good That All We..., on 2 videotapes
- 1999– Songs of Our Century
- 2001– Brave, People, Summer Will Come Soon!
- 2002– Why Can't We Meet for So Long?, in two parts
- 2003– Concert in Kremlin
- 2004– Concert in Kremlin. Because of Doing Nothing
- 2006– Concert on Ilmen Fest. Oleg Mityaev and Vladimir Kristovsky
- 2007– Songs of Mityaev. Anniversary Concert in Kremlin
- 2008– There Will Be No Romance Anymore, CD+DVD pack)
- 2009– Long Live Muse!, CD+DVD
