= Vyacheslav Dobrynin =

Russian composer and singer (1946–2024)

- Вячеслав Добрынин
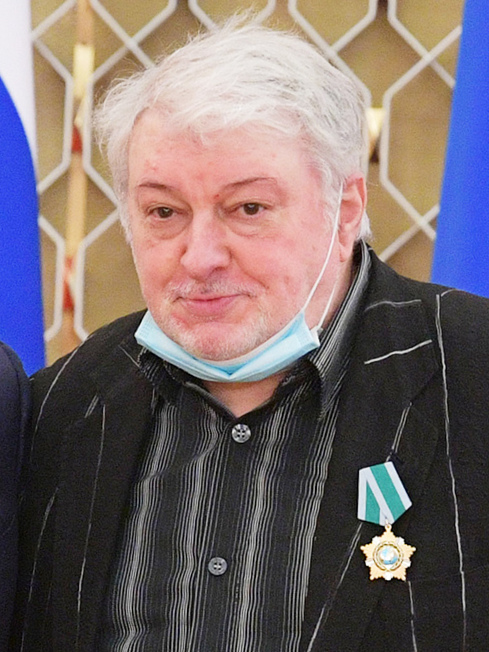
- Dobrynin in 2021
- Born: Vyacheslav Grigoryevich Antonov; 25 January 1946; Moscow, Russian SFSR, USSR
- Died: 1 October 2024 (aged 78); Moscow, Russia
- Education: Moscow State University
- Occupations: Composer; singer
- Years active: 1970s–2024
- Title: People's Artist of Russia (1996)
- Awards: Order "For Merit to the Fatherland" (4th class)

Vyacheslav Grigoryevich Dobrynin (Russian: Вячесла́в Григо́рьевич Добры́нин, born Antonov (Russian: Анто́нов); 25 January 1946 – 1 October 2024) was a popular Russian composer and singer also known as Doctor Shlyager. He was awarded the People's Artist of Russia in 1996.

== Early life ==
Dobrynin was born in 1946 to an Armenian father and a Russian mother. He never bore his father's surname of Petrosian – his father left the family before he was born and he used his mother's surname Antonov throughout his childhood, changing it to Dobrynin in 1972. He studied at Moscow State University and received a diploma as an "art historian and theorist" in 1970. He subsequently worked at the Tretyakov Gallery and Pushkin Museum.

== Career ==
As an amateur musician and singer he participated in different Beatles-style groups. Dobrynin started to compose songs in the late-1960s and from 1971 co-operated with the Oleg Lundstrem orchestra, "Vesyolye Rebyata", "Samotsvety" and other bands. He wrote more than 1000 songs, often based on poems by Leonid Derbenyov, Robert Rozhdestvensky, Mikhail Tanich and Ilya Reznik. In 1998, Dobrynin got a star on the Star Square in Moscow.

In the 1980s Dobrynin started to record his own songs, and in 1990 he founded "Doctor Shlyager" band.

== Death ==
It was reported that Dobrynin suffered a stroke in September 2024 and was hospitalised in Moscow. His death was reported on 1 October. He was 78.

== Family ==
He is survived by his wife, his daughter Yekaterina Dobrynina, and two grandchildren.

Dobrynin has performed in duets with his US born granddaughter Sonya Dobrynina-McGaffrey; with the songs "Whenever in the Future" (Когда Нибудь) and "All I Have in Life" (Все что в жизни есть у меня) to open a concert in the Kremlin in 2011 when she was 10, and "Raspberry Berry" (Ягода Малина) in Corcus City Hall in 2016 when she was 15 which was broadcast live on Russia's Channel One 1TV.

== Songs ==
Dobrynin's songs are mostly dedicated to unhappy love and romantic events of a person's life. Among his most popular hits are:

- All I Have in Life (Russian: Всё, что в жизни есть у меня, romanized: Vsyo, chto v zhizni yest' u menya)
- Native Land (Russian: Родная земля, romanized: Rodnaya zemlya)
- Don't Rub Salt Into My Wound (Russian: Не сыпь мне соль на рану, romanized: Ne syp' mne sol' na ranu)
- Where Have You Been (Russian: Где же ты была, romanized: Gde zhe ty byla)
- The Carriage is Rocking (Russian: Качается вагон, romanized: Kachayetsya vagon)
- Blue Fog (Russian: Синий туман, romanized: Siniy tuman)
- Two Candles (Russian: Две свечи, romanized: Dve svechi)
- White Bird Cherry (Russian: Белая черёмуха, romanized: Belaya cheromukha)
- Music is Playing On the Ship (Russian: На теплоходе музыка играет, romanized: Na teplokhode muzyka igrayet)
- The Music is Flowing (Russian: Льётся музыка, romanized: L'yotsya muzyka)
- Don't Worry Auntie (Russian: Не волнуйтесь, тётя, romanized: Ne volnuytes', tyotya)
- Big Dipper (Russian: Большая Медведица, romanized: Bol'shaya Medveditsa)
- Raspberry Berry (Russian: Ягода-малина, romanized: Yagoda-malina)
- Old Grannies (Russian: Бабушки-старушки, romanized: Babushki-starushki)
- Witch Lake (Russian: Колдовсое озеро, romanized: Koldovskoye ozero)
- Casino (Russian: Казино, romanized: Kazino)
- You Don't Dream of Me (Russian: Ты мне не снишься, romanized: Ty mne ne snish'sya)
- So This Is What You Are Like! (Russian: Так вот какая ты!, romanized: Tak vot kakaya ty!)
- You Broke My Heart (Russian: Ты разбила мне сердце, romanized: Ty razbila mne serdtse)
- Who Told You? (Russian: Кто тебе сказал?, romanized: Kto tebe skazal?)
- I'm Afraid of Your Love (Russian: Я боюсь твоей любви, romanized: Ya boyus' tvoyey lyubvi)
- Not a Moment's Peace (Russian: Ни минуты покоя, romanized: Ni minuty pokoya)
- Don't Forget Your Friends (Russian: Не забывайте друзей, romanized: Ne zabyvayte druzey)
- Write Me A Letter (Russian: Напиши мне письмо, romanized: Napishi mne pis'mo)
- The Queen of Spades (Russian: Пиковая дома, romanized: Pikovaya dama)
- I Miss You (Russian: Я тоскую по тебе, romanized: Ya toskuyu po tebe)
- I've Had My Fun (Russian: Я своё отгулял, romanized: Ya svoyo otgulyal)
- Nobody Loves You Like I Do (Russian: Никто тебя не любит так, как я, romanized: Nikto tebya ne lyubit tak, kak ya)
- Crazy Rain (Russian: Сумасшедший дождь, romanized: Sumashedshy dozhd')
- How Unlucky I Am (Russian: До чего ж я невезучий, romanized: Do chego zh ya nevezuchiy)
- Well (Russian: Колодец, romanized: Kolodets)
- Forget-me-not (Russian: Незабудка, romanized: Nezabudka)
- Goodbye (Russian: Прощай, romanized: Proshchay)

== Awards ==
- Lenin Komsomol Prize
- 15-time winner of Song of the Year Russia
- Ovation prize (1991, best composer)
- Order of Merit for the Fatherland IV degree (30 January 2006)
- Order of Friendship (2018)
