= Zemlyane =

Soviet then Russian rock band formed in 1978

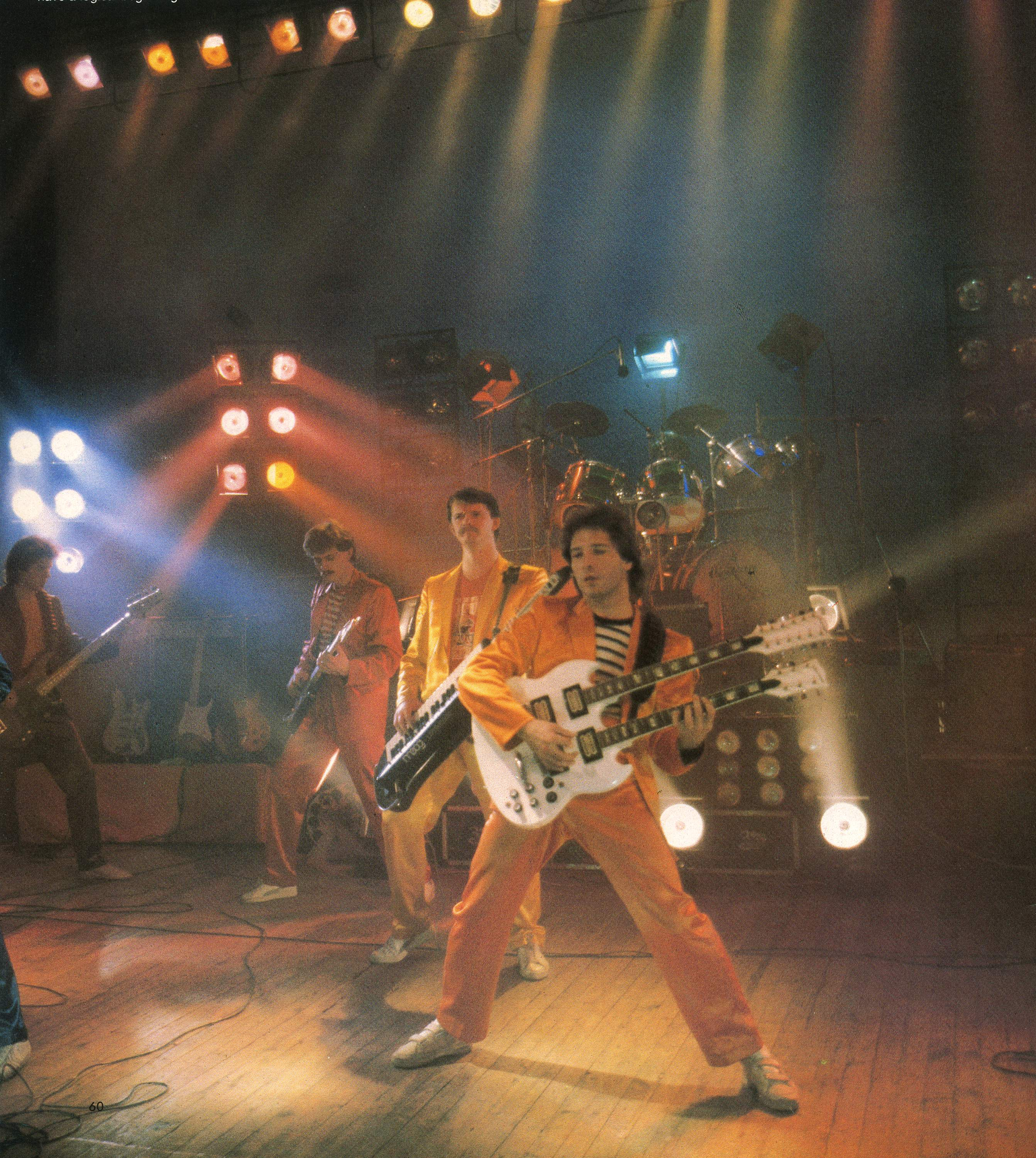
- Zemlyane, circa 1984

Background information
- Origin: Leningrad, Soviet Union (now St. Petersburg, Russia)
- Genres: Pop rock; art rock
- Years active: 1978–present
- Label: Melodiya
- Members: Sergey Skachkov; Oleg Khovrin; Andrey Smirnov; Andrey Ismagilov
- Past members: Igor Romanov; Boris Aksenov; Pavel Borisov; Boris Dolgikh; Gennadiy Martov; Sergey Vasiliev; Yuriy Babenko; Aleksandr Krivtsov; Georgiy Tonkelidi; Andrey Kruglov; Nikolay Kudryavtsev; Viktor Kudryavtsev; Veronika Stepanova; Yuriy Starchenko; Sergey Kolchin
- Website: www.zemlyane.com

Zemlyane (Russian: Земляне, lit. 'Earthlings') is a Soviet and later Russian rock band, formed in Leningrad in 1978. Most of their lyrics deal with risk, courage, and masculinity.

In 2009, Zemlyane's 1980s hit "Trava u doma" (Russian: «Трава у дома», lit. 'Тhe grass at home') became the first official anthem of the Russian space program.

== History ==
Zemlyane was formed in 1968 by students of Leningrad Radiopolytechnical College. In 1978 Zemlyane stopped performing on stage for several months for reasons of reorganization and rest.

Their former administrator Andrey Bolshev and drummer of rock band April, Vladimir Kiselev (ru), decided to take advantage of this situation. They put together totally different musicians passing them off as real Zemlyane. Protests from the original Zemlyane rock band were completely ignored. The accession of the Soviet Union to the Universal Copyright Convention, which became effective on 27 May was formal and no one dared to sue for copyright violation or infringement. Thus, in 1979 two groups of musicians performed under the same name: Zemlyane led by Myasnikov (keyboards) and Zemlyane promoted by Kiselev and Bolshev.

In 1987, Zemlyane opened for Uriah Heep at the Olympic Stadium in Moscow.

The band went on hiatus by the beginning of the next decade, but was revived by Sergey Skachkov in 1994 with a relatively new lineup. A copyright dispute between Skachkov and Kiselev arose when Kiselev (as producer) created a band of young musicians, unrelated to old Zemlyane, which used Zemlyane's name and performed its old hits. The dispute was eventually settled in 2009 in favor of Skachkov.

In 2015, Zemlyane supported annexation of Crimea and gave a concert in Sevastopol, which was annexed by Russia. The band supported the 2022 Russian invasion of Ukraine, and the Presidential Administration of Russia put the band on the list of singers who were recommended to be invited to state-sponsored events.

Guitarist Sergey Kolchin died on 15 June 2023, at the age of 45.

== Discography ==
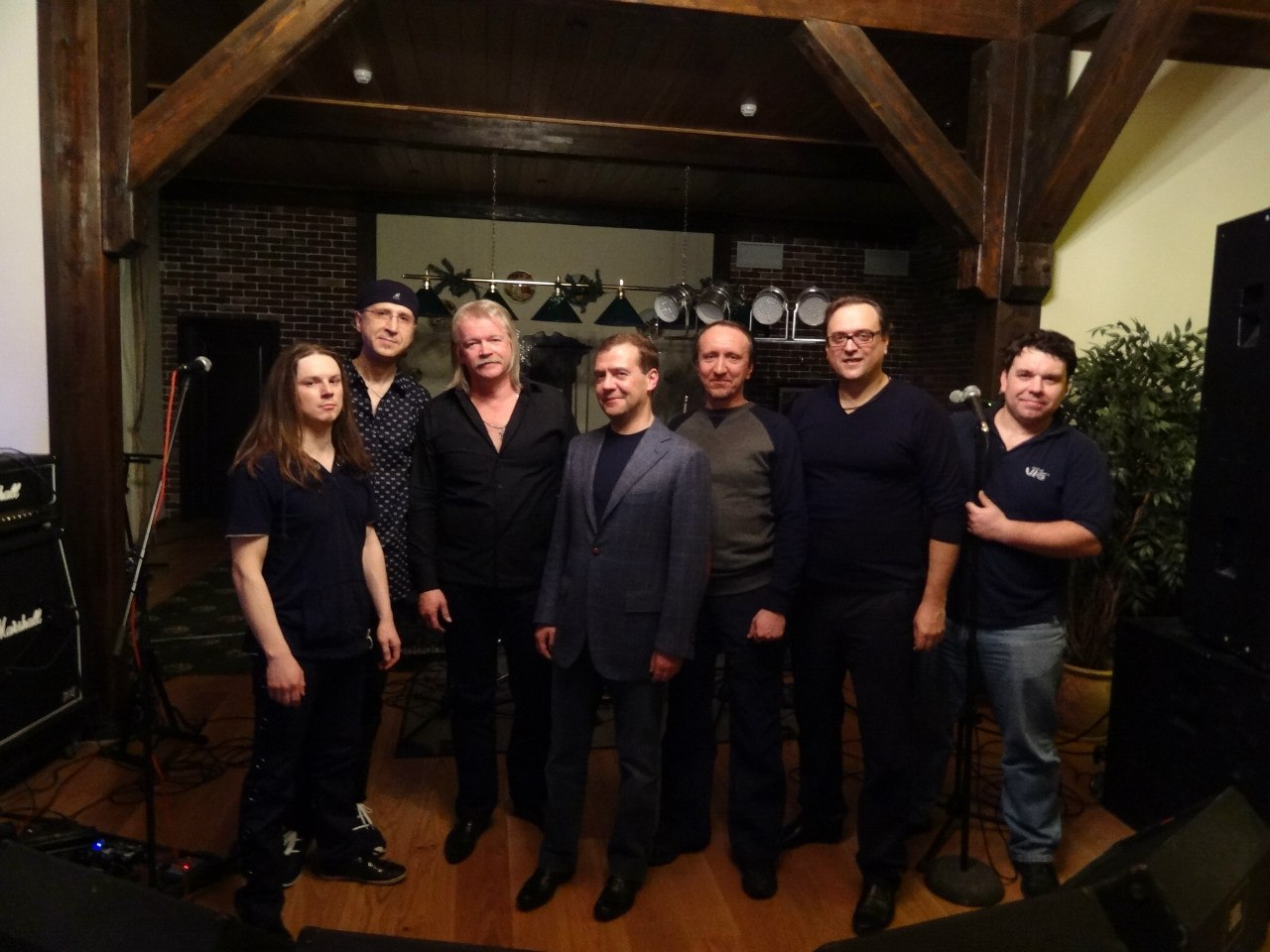
Zemlyane and Dmitry Medvedev, 21 January 2012

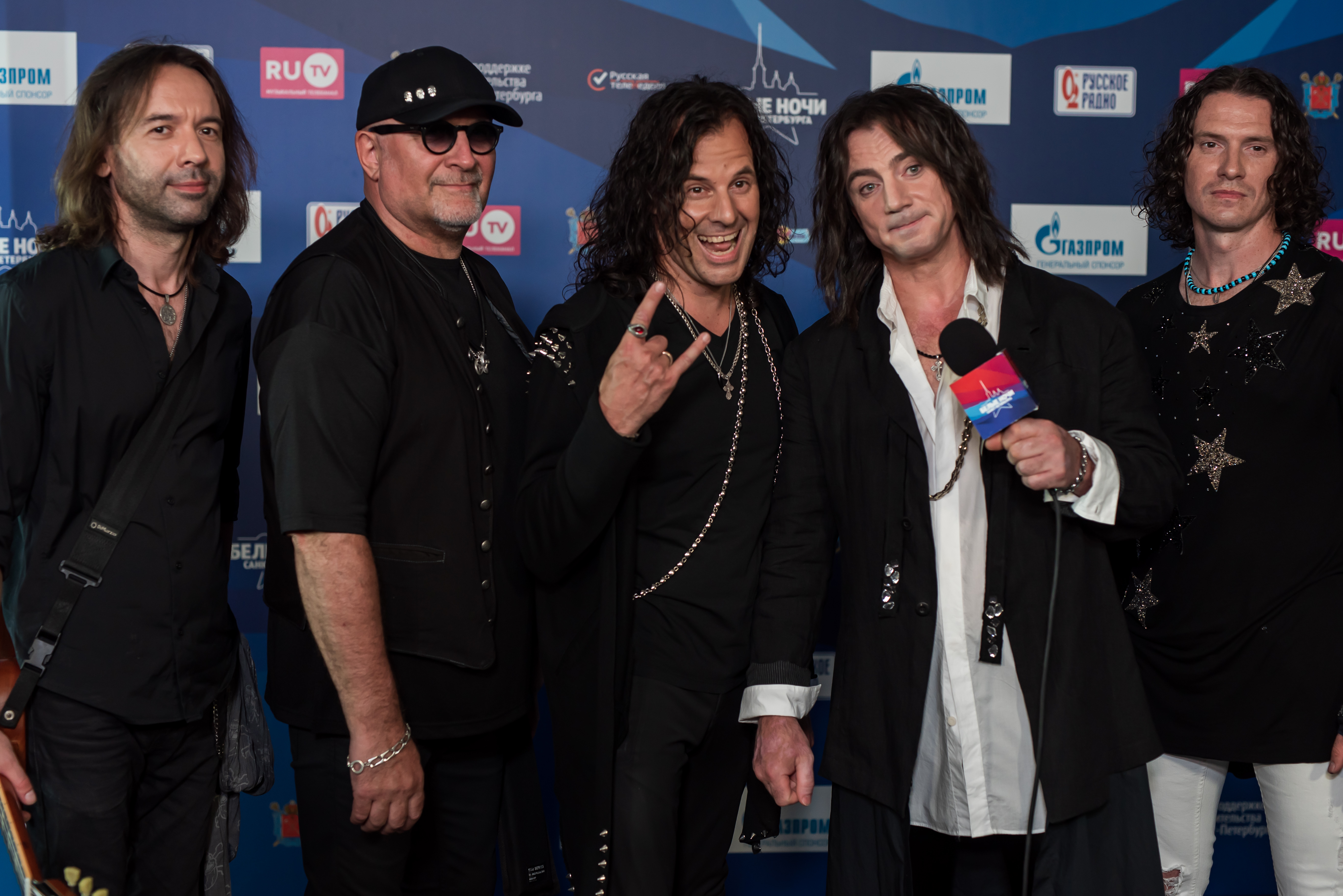
Zemlyane, 11 July 2021

FULL DISCOGRAPHY OF OFFICIAL RELEASES AND MAGNIT-ALBUMS

- 1979 — «Красный Конь» / EP, ВФГ «Мелодия»
- 1980 — Владимир Мигуля & группа «ЗЕМЛЯНЕ» / LP, ВФГ «Мелодия»
- 1981/82 — «Концертная Программа, LIVE 1981-1982» / Magnit-Album, tape
- 1981 — «Земляне 81» / Magnit-Album, tape
- 1982 — «Земляне 82» / Magnit-Album, tape
- 1982 — «Концерт в Харькове, 1982» / Magnit-Album, tape
- 1982 — «Концерт в Кургане, 5 December 1982» / Magnit-Album, tape
- 1982 — «Концерт в ЛДМ, Ленинград, март 1982» / Magnit-Album, tape
- 1982 — «Карате» / EP, ВФГ «Мелодия»
- 1983 — «Каскадеры» / EP, ВФГ «Мелодия»
- 1983 — «Дельтаплан» / EP, ВФГ «Мелодия»
- 1983 — «Крепче Держись, Сынок» / Magnit-Album, tape
- 1984 — «Путь Домой» / Magnit-Album, tape
- 1984/85 — «Ау, Лабиринт» / Magnit-Album, tape
- 1985 — «Концерт в СКК им.Ленина, Ленинград, 20.02.85» / Magnit-Album, tape
- 1987 — «Радость и Печаль» / Magnit-Album, tape
- 1987 — «День Рождения Земли» / MC, LP, ВФГ «Мелодия»
- 1988 — «Дымкою Мая» / EP ВФГ «Мелодия»
- 1988/90 — «По Закону Земли» / Magnit-Album, tape
- 1988/90 — «Мужчины…» / Magnit-Album, tape
- 1989/92 — «Русские, русские, русские» (С.Скачков) / Magnit-Album, tape
- 1989/92 — «Сладкая Игра» («Восточный Экспресс») / Magnit-Album, tape
- 1994 — «Лучшие Хиты» best / 2CD, «NP.Records»
- 1995 — «Трава у Дома» best / CD, MC, «ZeKo Records»
- 1995 — «Мы Люди» best / CD, МС, «ZeKo Records»
- 1998 — «Лучшие Песни» (remake) / MC, CD, «CD-MediaRecords / ZeKo Records»
- 2000 — «SOS» (С.Скачков) / CD, МС, «ZeKo Records»
- 2002 — «Grand Collection» best / CD, МС, «Квадро Диск»
- 2003 — «Энциклопедия Российского Рока» best / CD, «Grand Records»
- 2003 — «Лучшие Песни» best / CD, МС, «Мистерия Звука»
- 2008 — «Холод Души» (С.Скачков) / CD, «Navigator Records»
- 2008 — «Концерт-презентация сольного альбома «Холод Души», ККЗ "Мир" 2 February 2008» (С.Скачков) / 2CD, 2DVD, «GMC»
- 2009 — «ЗЕМЛЯНЕ & SUPERMAX / Сергей Скачков & Kurt Hauenstein» / CD, «НП.ЦДЮТ.ЗЕМЛЯНЕ / Союз»
- 2010 — «Символы Любви» (С.Скачков) / CD, «НП.ЦДЮТ.ЗЕМЛЯНЕ / CD'Maximum»
- 2014 — «Половина Пути» (С.Скачков) / CD, «ООО ПЦ Сергея Скачкова / ООО М2»
