= Viktor Chaika =

Russian composer

- Born: Viktor Grigorievich Sigal; 11 December 1958 (age 67); Odessa
- Occupations: composer, musician, singer
- Years active: 1982–present
- Spouse: Polina Sigal

Viktor Chaika (Russian: Виктор Чайка); real name Viktor Grigorievich Sigal (Russian: Виктор Григорьевич Сигал); (born December 11, 1958, Odessa, USSR) is a Soviet and Russian pop composer, songwriter, singer and musician. Known for dozens of songs for Aleksey Glyzin (Winter Garden, You're Not an Angel), Tatyana Ovsiyenko (Captain, Beautiful Girl), Irina Allegrova (Transit Passenger, Drafts, Imagined) and many other pop stars. Some time singing solo (Mona Lisa, Where Are You Going Anywhere). He worked as a music producer on the show Boris Moiseev, and the manager of tours of foreign performers. Pesnya Goda Multiple nominee and winner of the festival. He wrote the music for several films.

== Family ==
The first wife was Irina Borisova. The son is Alexey.

The second wife was Tatyana Agurbash (2003-2009).

in 2016, his chosen one became Polina Solovyova. In 2023, the second child was born.

== Filmography ==
- 1988 — Primorsky Boulevard (vocals)
- 1991 — The Mannequin in Love (composer)
- 2010 — Wirth: The Game is Not Childish (composer)
- 2010 — The Last Secret of the Master (composer, actor)
- 2016 — Svetoforov’s Family (composer, actor)
- 2017 — The Tale of Peter and Fevronia (composer)
- 2020 — She Abandoned the Bunny... (composer)
