= David Tukhmanov =

Soviet and Russian composer (born 1940)

- Давид Тухманов
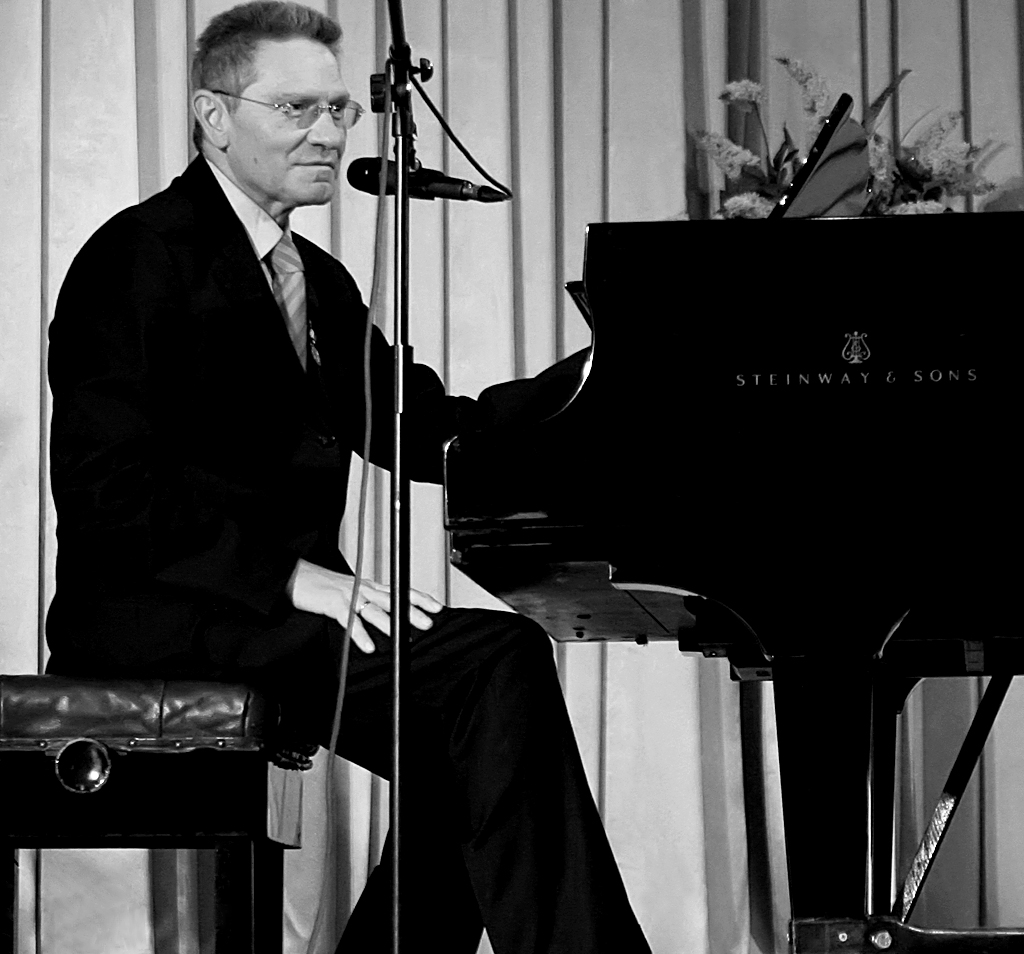
- Tukhmanov in 2007
- Born: July 20, 1940 (age 86); Moscow, Russian SFSR, Soviet Union (now Russia)
- Education: Gnessin State Musical College
- Occupation: Composer
- Years active: 1961—present
- Notable work: Den Pobedy (1975)
- Title: People's Artist of Russia (2000)
- Awards: (2003, 2019)
- Website: www.davidtuchmanov.com

David Fyodorovich Tukhmanov PAR (Russian: Дави́д Фёдорович Тухма́нов, was born July 20, 1940) is a Soviet and Russian composer. People's Artist of Russia (2000), State Prize of Russian Federation (2003, 2019).

== Biography ==
Tukhmanov is a son of an Armenian engineer Fyodor Davidovich Tukhmanov and a Russian music teacher Vera Anatolyevna Karasyova. The Tukhmanovs are the descendants of the Armenian princely house of Tumanyans, the offspring of the princes Mamikonians, Lords of Dsegh. David began to learn music under the direction of his mother at an early age and wrote his first piece of music (Lezginka), when he was four years old. Then he finished Gnesins musical school (1958) and composer's branch of Gnesins Musical College (1963). His degree's work was the oratorio for soloists, chorus and an orchestra Distance After Distance, which is based on fragments of the epic poem of the same name by Alexander Tvardovsky.

=== Early career ===
Tukhmanov is known for several Soviet-themed hit songs such as "Victory Day" (Russian: День Победы, lit. 'Den Pobedy') and other popular songs. His first hit song was "Last Electrichka" (Russian: Последняя электричка, lit. 'Poslednyaya electrichka') in 1968. In 1973 Tukhmanov wrote songs and music for a TV film This Merry Planet. In the following year he released soundtrack album, which also included several additional songs.

In 1972 Tukhmanov released his first personally authored album How Beautiful the World is (Russian: Как прекрасен мир, lit. 'Kak prekrasen mir') which he described as a trial work cause of its conceptual structure. In 1975-76 he created an album-suite On a Wave of My Memory (Russian: По волне моей памяти, lit. 'Po volne moyey pamyati'). The idea of On a Wave of My Memory belonged to Tatyana Sashko, the wife of David Tukhmanov, and she was the one who picked the classic poems for the album's songs. It is considered to be the first conceptual Russian rock album. Wave's execution was done in secret, in more remote studios across Moscow, with tight lips and low profile, for fear of censors shutting down the project before fruition, but this did not happen. This album was a record-breaking success for the USSR, becoming a highly sought-after product. It rivaled the top albums of Pink Floyd or Deep Purple in terms of desirability.

Some rock fans said that On a Wave of My Memory is a Russian Sergeant (they meant Sgt. Pepper's Lonely Hearts Club Band). I would prefer to recollect «great albums» of Pink Floyd, but I want to tell about another. Imagine the circle and place the tracks clockwise. You will see from right to left and from top to down:

Top — Prologue (Voloshin) & Epilogue (Mickiewicz)

Top chord — Female songs (Sappho & Akhmatova)

Diameter — German poetry (Vagantes & Goethe)

Down chord — French poetry (Baudelaire & Verlaine)

Down — Shelley, Invisible Counterpoint, Guillén

— Vadim Nikolayev, Notes About Russian Rock

=== 1980s ===
In January, 1981, Tukhmanov organized rock band Moskva (Moscow) — Nikolai Noskov (vocals, rhythm guitar), Alexey Belov (vocals, lead guitar, keyboards), Dmitry Serebryakov (drums). In 1982 Moskva released an album UFO. Musical critic Yuri Filinov had noted that UFO «is rather far from structure of thinking in Western rock» (though arrangements, instruments, rhythms were modern). Filinov also defined the album as a noncommercial disk. Perhaps, because of this fact Tukhmanov ceased to write songs for the band. In the spring of 1984 Noskov left the band, and soon he recorded Tukhmanov's song Night. In 1985 Moskva recorded Tukhmanov's song XXIII Century.

In 1984 and in 1985 Tukhmanov wrote five songs for Alexander Barykin's Carnaval to release a collaboration LP Steps (Russian: Ступени, lit. 'Stupeni'). In the same years he wrote all songs for mini-album of Estonian Soviet pop singer Jaak Joala Love Itself (Russian: Сама любовь, lit. 'Sama lyubov'). In 1985 Tukhmanov also has released an album War Songs, dedicating to the 40th anniversary of Soviet victory in Second World War.

In 1986 Tukhmanov wrote music and songs for TV film The Travel of M. Perrichon (adaptation of Eugène Labiche's vaudeville). In the next year he has released his second soundtrack album.

In 1986 Tukhmanov also organized pop band Electroclub, which released three albums. In 1989, after his work with Electroclub, Tukhmanov created the musical Thief of Bagdad (together with poet and lyricist Yuri Entin). Premiere has taken place in 1990 — in Moscow (theatre Satiricon) and in Sverdlovsk. This musical is directed until now in many cities of Russia.

=== Later years ===
After the disintegration of USSR Tukhmanov emigrated to Germany. In 1995 he returned and wrote together with Entin six cycles of songs for children (he also wrote the hymn of children's animated festival «Golden Fish»). He wrote cycle Square Windows (based on the poems by Innokenty Annensky) too. In 2007 Tukhmanov wrote songs for literary-musical composition, which based on the poems by Alexander Pushkin. CD Long Live the Muses! has released in 2009, to 210 years from the birth of Pushkin.

In 2007 Tukhmanov and Yuri Entin finished their second variant of the musical Evening in Copenhagen (on motives of Nikolai Erdman's play The Mandate).

Tukhmanov also came back to classical style. In 2002 he created the oratorio Legend of Yermak for big chorus, the soloists and an orchestra. In the end of 2005 he has finished his creation of an opera Ekaterina the Great. Ekaterina the Great (libretto by Yuri Ryashentsev and Galina Polidi) has been directed in the theatre Gelikon Opera under the title Tsaritsa. Premiere has taken place in 2009, in Saint Petersburg.

Tukhmanov wrote triptych for a mezzo-soprano and a piano Dream of Sebastian, or Saint Night (bazed on the poems by Georg Trakl). The first performance has taken place in 2007, in Moscow.

In 1998 Tukhmanov is invited to musical direction of World Olympic Junior Games in Moscow and wrote music to this competitions. He did the same in 2002. In 2000, when Tukhmanov was 60 years old, he organized jubilee's concert, and he organized author's concert Attraction of Love in 2004. In 2010, when Tukhmanov was 70 years old, Igor Krutoy was the producer of jubilee's concert in Jūrmala. In the same year Tukhmanov has released solo album Tango of Boris Poplavsky's Dreams.

In 2009, he created a cycle based on the poems of A. S. Pushkin, which was performed by Oleg Mityaev, Marina Esipenko, and Witold Petrovsky. The premiere took place at the "Eldar Cinema Club", and was later presented at the Mikhaylovskoye Museum Reserve and on the stages of the Oktyabrsky Concert Hall and the State Kremlin Palace.

In 2012 Tukhmanov took part in jubilee's concert of Lev Leshchenko and in a concert DIALOGUES AT WITNESSES with Andrey Maximov. Not Formatted David TUKHMANOV. In 2013 he has taken part in jubilee's concert of Valeriya.

On September 18, 2013, Tukhmanov took part in the shooting of TV broadcast Property of the Republic ("DOstoyaniye REspubliki"; Do is a note C on Russian and Re is a note D on Russian), which has been dedicated to his creativity. TV broadcast appeared on October 6. On the results of voting (by TV spectators and spectators in studio) Victory Day has been recognized as Tukhmanov's best song.

== Personal life ==
His first wife, Tatyana Sashko, was a singer and songwriter who also served as his producer for nearly two decades from the mid-1960s. The couple had a daughter, Anastasia, who was born in 1974. She pursued her studies at MGIMO and became a skilled English-language translator. While he was away in Germany for an extended period, his second wife Natalya decided to end their marriage and even went so far as to evict him from their five-room apartment in Moscow. David took the matter to court. The nature of the estrangement between David, Tatyana and their daughter remains private, as David prefers not to publicly discuss the reasons for their current lack of communication.

His third and current wife, Lyubov Gurevitch, is a talented pianist and singer residing in Israel. They met in 1991 while they were both in Germany. He currently splits his time between Israel, his wife's country, and Russia. In Israel, he lives in the small town of Kiryat Ono, which is part of the Tel Aviv District.

== Popular songs ==
- Chistye Prudy (Чистые пруды)
- Den Pobedy (День Победы)
- Eti glaza naprotiv (Эти глаза напротив)
- Iz Vagantov (Из вагантов)
- Kak Prekrasen Etot Mir (Как прекрасен этот мир)
- Moi Adres Sovetskii Soiuz (Мой адрес — Советский Союз)
- Naprasnie Slova (Напрасные слова)
- Noch (Ночь)
- Poslednyaya Elektrichka (Последняя электричка)
- Solovyinaya Roshcha (Соловьиная роща)
- Vostochnaya Pesnya (Восточная песня)

== Discography ==
Russian title	English translation	Year
«Песни Давида Тухманова»	David Tukhmanov's Songs	1970(EP)
«Как прекрасен мир»	How the World Is Fine	1972(LP), 1997(CD)
«Мой адрес — Советский Союз»	My Address Is Soviet Union	1973(EP)
«Я еду к морю»	I Go to Sea	1974(EP)
«Эта веселая планета»	These Cheerful Planet	1974(LP)
Ансамбль «Веселые ребята». Песни Давида Тухманова.	Vesiolie Rebiata. David Tukhmanov's Songs.	1975(EP)
Давид Тухманов. Песни.	David Tukhmanov. Songs.	1975(EP)
«По волне моей памяти»	On My Memory's Wave	1975(LP), 1997(CD), 2000(CD), 2005(CD)
«Соловьиная роща»	Nightingale's Grove	1976(EP)
Песни Давида Тухманова	David Tukhmanov's Songs	1977(Single)
Памяти гитариста. Памяти поэта.	In Memory of the Guitarist. In Memory of the Poet.	1978(Single)
Давид Тухманов. Песни.	David Tukhmanov. Songs.	1979(EP)
«Олимпиада-80»	Olympiad-80	1980
«Кружатся диски»	Disks Go Round	1980
Н.Л.О. Группа «Москва»	UFO. Moscva band.	1982(LP), 2007(CD)
«Карнавал». Ступени.	Carnaval. Steps.	1985(LP), 1996(CD)
Яак Йоала. Сама любовь.	Jaak Joala. Love Itself.	1985(LP on 45 rpm), 2007(CD)
Военные песни. Давид Тухманов.	War Songs. David Tukhmanov.	1985(LP)
"Путешествие мсье Перришона"	The Travel of M. Perrichon	1987(LP)
«Электроклуб»	Electroclub	1987(LP)
«Электроклуб»-2	Electroclub 2	1988(LP)
«Электроклуб»	Electroclub. Toy.	1989(LP)
Давид Тухманов. Притяжение Земли.	David Tukhmanov. Attraction of Earth.	1997(CD, compilation)
Давид Тухманов. Мой адрес — Советский Союз.	David Tukhmanov. My Address Is Soviet Union.	1998(CD, compilation)
—	Weimar Suite	1999(CD, instrumental music, Germany)
Давид Тухманов. Мои любимые (песни в исполнении автора).	David Tukhmanov. My Beloved (songs in the performance of author).	1999(CD)
Д. Тухманов, Ю. Энтин. Детям: Золотая горка.	D. Tukhmanov, Y. Entin. For Children: Golden Hill.	2000(CD)
Давид Тухманов. Вечная весна. Избранные песни.	David Tukhmanov. Eternal Spring. Selected Songs.	2000(CD)
«Волшебные детские песенки»	Magic Children's Songs	2001 (2CD), 2007(2CD)
Давид Тухманов. Родина моя.	David Tukhmanov. My Motherland.	2001(CD, compilation)
Давид Тухманов, Людмила Гурченко. "Мадлен, спокойно!". Музыка и песни к спектаклю Романа Козака.	David Tukhmanov, Lyudmila Gurchenko. "Madlen, Be Easy!". Music and songs to Roman Kozak's theatrical performance.	2003(CD)
Давид Тухманов. Европейская сюита.	David Tukhmanov. The European Suite.	2004(CD, instrumental music)
Давид Тухманов. Карнавал-сюита	David Tukhmanov. Carnival-suite.	2004(CD, instrumental music)
Иосиф Кобзон. Посвящение другу (песни Давида Тухманова).	Joseph Kobzon. Dedication to a Friend (David Tukhmanov's Songs).	2005(CD)
Давид Тухманов. Сердце любить должно. Избранное.	David Tukhmanov. Heart Must Love. Selection.	2005(CD, compilation and new records[NR])
Давид Тухманов. Белый танец.	David Tukhmanov. White Dance.	2006(CD, compilation)
Давид Тухманов. Марши для духового оркестра	David Tukhmanov. Marches for Trumpet Orchestra.	2006(CD, instrumental music)
Давид Тухманов. Элегия.	David Tukhmanov. Elegy.	2006(CD, compilation and new records [NR])
Давид Тухманов. Звездная песня неба.	David Tukhmanov. Sky's Star Song.	2006(CD, compilation)
«Электроклуб». Темная лошадка.	Electroclub. Dark Horse.	2007(CD, compilation)
«Веселые ребята». Любовь — дитя планеты. Давид Тухманов.	Vesiolie Rebiata. Love Is the Child of Planet. David Tukhmanov.	2007(CD, compilation)
Давид Тухманов. Вечное движение.	David Tukhmanov. Eternal Movement.	2008(CD, compilation)
Давид Тухманов. Семейный альбом.	David Tukhmanov. Family Album.	2008(CD, compilation)
Давид Тухманов. Не забывай.	David Tukhmanov. Don't Forget.	2008(CD, compilation)
Давид Тухманов. Танго снов Бориса Поплавского.	David Tukhmanov. Tango of Boris Poplavsky's Dreams.	2010(CD)

Tukhmanov's significant compositions are associated with the following bands and artists (in order of performance):

- Valeriy Obodzinskiy
- Vesyolye Rebyata
- Alexander Gradsky
- Yuri Antonov
- Pesniary
- Leysya, Pesnya
- Samotsvety
- Lev Leschenko
- Igor Ivanov
- Sofia Rotaru
- Edita Piekha
- Eduard Khil
- Mikhail Boyarsky
- Tõnis Mägi
- Valery Leontiev
- Alexander Barykin
- Yuri Gulyayev
- Nikolai Noskov
- Electroclub
- Irina Allegrova
- Igor Talkov
- Alexander Malinin

== Other songs and other versions of songs ==
- 1969 Muslim Magomayev — And the Snow Will Be Tumbled Down (based on the poem by Yevgeny Yevtushenko)
- 1971 Yuri Gulyaev — If I Will Ill (based on the poem by Yaroslav Smelyakov)
- 1972 Nina Brodskaya — Our Home (lyric by Leonid Derbenyov)
- 1973 Karel Gott — The Ground Is Dark (lyric by Boris Cheskis)
- 1974 Anna German — I Won't Approach to You (lyric by Leonid Derbenyov and Igor Shaferan)
- 1976 Plamya (the soloist — Valentin Diyakonov) — Good Day, Mother (lyric by Robert Rojdestvensky)
- 1982 Valery Leontiev — Thank You, Love (lyric by Igor Shaferan)
- 1983 Lev Leshchenko — Women (lyric by Leonid Fadeev)
- 1985 Valery Leontiev — Bitter Apples (lyric by Anatoly Poperechny)
- 1986 Larisa Dolina — My Notebook (based on the poem by L. Stefar, translated to Russian by Vladimir Soloukhin)
- 1986 Valery Leontiev — Ballad of Icy House (lyric by Anna Sayed-Shah)
- 1986 Sergey Zakharov — Why You Have Bypassed Summer? (lyric by Boris Dubrovin)
- 1986 Electroclub (the soloist — Irina Allegrova) — Birthday (lyric by Simon Osiashvili)
- 1987 Electroclub (the soloist — Victor Saltykov) — The Lost Bank of River (lyric by Sergey Romanov)
- 1987 Electroclub (the soloist — Victor Saltykov) — Photo for Memory (lyric by Anatoly Poperechny)
- 1987 Electroclub (the soloist — Irina Allegrova) — Berry Season (lyric by Anna Sayed-Shah)
- 1987 Electroclub (the soloist — Victor Saltykov) — No Entrance for Strangers (lyric by Sergey Romanov)
- 1997 Maxim Leonidov — From Vagantes (translated to Russian by Lev Ginsburg)
- 2000 Alexander Gradsky — Waltz (lyric by Igor Shaferan)
- 2005 Anastasiya Stotskaya — Confusion (based on the poem by Anna Akhmatova)
- 2009 Oleg Mityaev — The Recognition (based on the poem by Alexander Pushkin)
- 2009 Vitold Petrovsky — The Desire of Glory (based on the poem by Alexander Pushkin)
- 2010 Relict — Names (lyric by Vladimir Kharitonov)
- 2010 Vladimir Markin — Is (lyric by Mikhail Nojkin)
- 2011 Dmitry Tretyakov — Bells of Volokolamsk (lyric by Petr Sinyavsky)

== See also ==
- Karel Gott
- Anna German
- Sergey Zakharov
- Oleg Mityaev
