= Irina Allegrova =

Russian singer (born 1952)

- Ирина Аллегрова
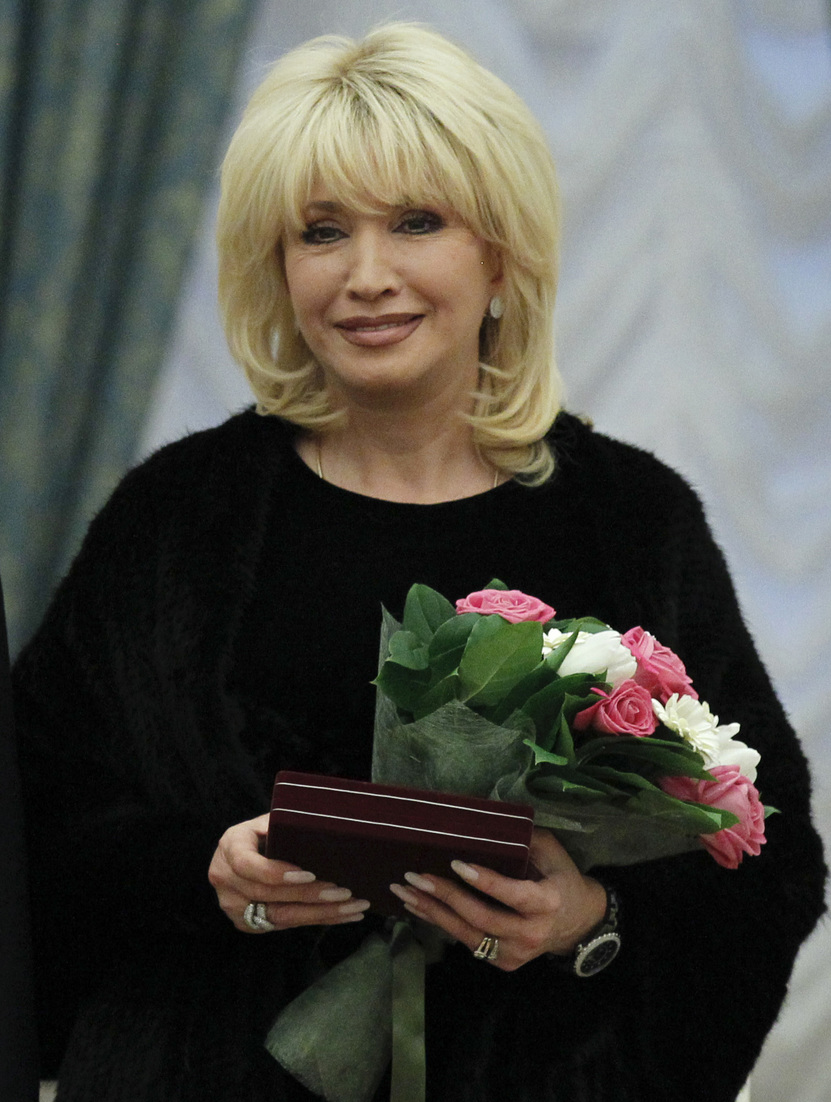
- Born: Irina Aleksandrovna Allegrova; 20 January 1952 (age 74); Rostov-on-Don, Soviet Union
- Occupations: Singer; actress
- Years active: 1975–present
- Height: 172 cm (5 ft 7 1/2 in)
- Title: People's Artist of Russia (2010)
- Musical career
- Genres: Pop; dance; synthpop; pop rock; dance-rock
- Instruments: Vocals
- Website: irinaallegrova.ru

Irina Aleksandrovna Allegrova (Russian: Ирина Александровна Аллегрова; born 20 January 1952) is a Russian singer. She is a People's Artist of Russia (2010).

Also known as the "Empress" of the Russian stage ("Императрица" российской естрады).

== Biography ==
Allegrova was born in Rostov-on-Don in 1952. Her father, Aleksander Sarkisov, an ethnic Armenian, took the surname Allegrov when he was just 17 and Irina was born with this surname. Her Russian mother was Serafima Sosnovskaya. Allegrova was brought up in a theatrical family with famous people who frequented their house and impressed the young girl. She spent her early life in Baku, Azerbaijan SSR where she studied piano and ballet. Allegrova gave birth to one daughter, Lala, at a young age. She left Lala with her parents and moved to Moscow to become a singer at the age of 22.

In 1985, Allegrova met Oscar Feltsman, who gave her a chance at a solo career and wrote several songs for her. Then, in 1987 she became soloist in David Tukhmanov's band – Electroclub.

Her debut album "My Destined One – Suzheny/Wanderer – Strannik" was written and produced by her neighbor and friend Igor Nikolaev. Allegrova's next album was "Ugonschitsa" (1994–1995). She toured the United States after that album's release. She began to work with Igor Krutoi, changed her hair to her natural brunette, married and started a family, and bought a house on the outskirts of Moscow. Irina and Krutoi released two albums together, "I will disperse the clouds with my hands" and "Un-finished Romance" (1996, 1998). Allegrova divorced, released a healing-themed album called "Teatr" (Theater) (1999) and went on tour around the world. In 2005, she began working exclusively with Aleksei Garnizov on the Po Lezviyu Lyubvi (On the razor's edge of love) trilogy. Allegrova announced that in March 2012 she will be retiring and went on a final tour, she is still doing concerts, however, very rarely. At the end of 2013, she released a new song with Russian singer Slava called "First Love, Last Love".

== Political views ==
In the 1996 presidential election, Allegrova campaigned for Boris Yeltsin, participating in the "Vote or lose" election campaign.

Allegrova supported the 2022 Russian invasion of Ukraine and used proceeds from concerts to support the Russian army. In January 2023, Ukraine imposed sanctions on Allegrova. In February, Canada sanctioned her.

== Discography ==
=== Studio albums ===
- Strannik moy (1992)
- Suzheny moy... (1994)
- Ugonshchitsa (1994)
- Ya tuchi razvedu rukami... (1996)
- Imperatritsa (1997)
- Nezakoncheny roman (1998)
- Teatr... (1999)
- Vsyo snachala... (2001)
- Po lezviyu lyubvi (2002)
- Popolam (with Mikhail Shufutinsky; 2004)
- S dnyom rozhdeniya! (2005)
- Allegrova 2007 (2007)
- Eksklyuzivnoye izdaniye (2010)
- Perezagruzka. Pererozhdeniye (2016)

=== Video albums ===
- Ya tuchi razvedu rukami (1996)
- Nezakoncheny roman Iriny Allegrovoy (1998)
- Ispoved (1998)
- Ispoved neslomlennoy zhenshchiny (2010)

=== Compilation albums ===
- Suzheny moy... (1994)
- The Best (2002)
- Luchshiye pesni (2002)
- Grand Collection (2002)
- Lyubovnoe nastroeniye (2003)
- Grand Collection (2009)
- O muzhchinach i dlya muzhchin (2019)
- S prazdnikom, dorogiye devchonki! (2019)
- Neizdannoe (2019)
- Semya. Lyubov. Vernost (2019)
- Mono... (2019)
- Luchshiye duety (2019)
- Byvshiye... (2020)

=== EPs ===
- S novym godom (2018)

=== Singles ===
- "Pervaya lyubov – lyubov poslednyaya" (with Slava; 2013)
- "Kino o ljubvi" (with Ivan; 2016)
- "Osen" (with Igor Krutoy; 2020)

== Awards ==
- 2010 – People's Artist of the Russian Federation
- 2007, 2010, 2014, 2018 – Winner of the Golden Gramophone Award

== Personal life ==
Irina Allegrova was married four times:

- First husband, 1971–1972 – Georgy Tairov, basketball player from Baku; in 1972 daughter Lala was born (pop director, married to Artem Artemyev, Russian judo champion, champion and medalist of the Russian and world Sambo championships);
- Second husband, 1974–1979 – Vladimir Bleher, artistic director of the ensemble "Vesyolyye Rebyata";
- Third husband, 1985–1990 – Vladimir Dubovitsky, producer and musician, creator of the ensemble "Lights of Moscow";
- Fourth husband, 1993–1999 – Igor Kapusta, a dancer from her team (the marriage was not officially registered, but the couple got married).
