= Valentina Tolkunova =

Russian singer (1946–2010)

Valentina Tolkunova Валентина Толкунова
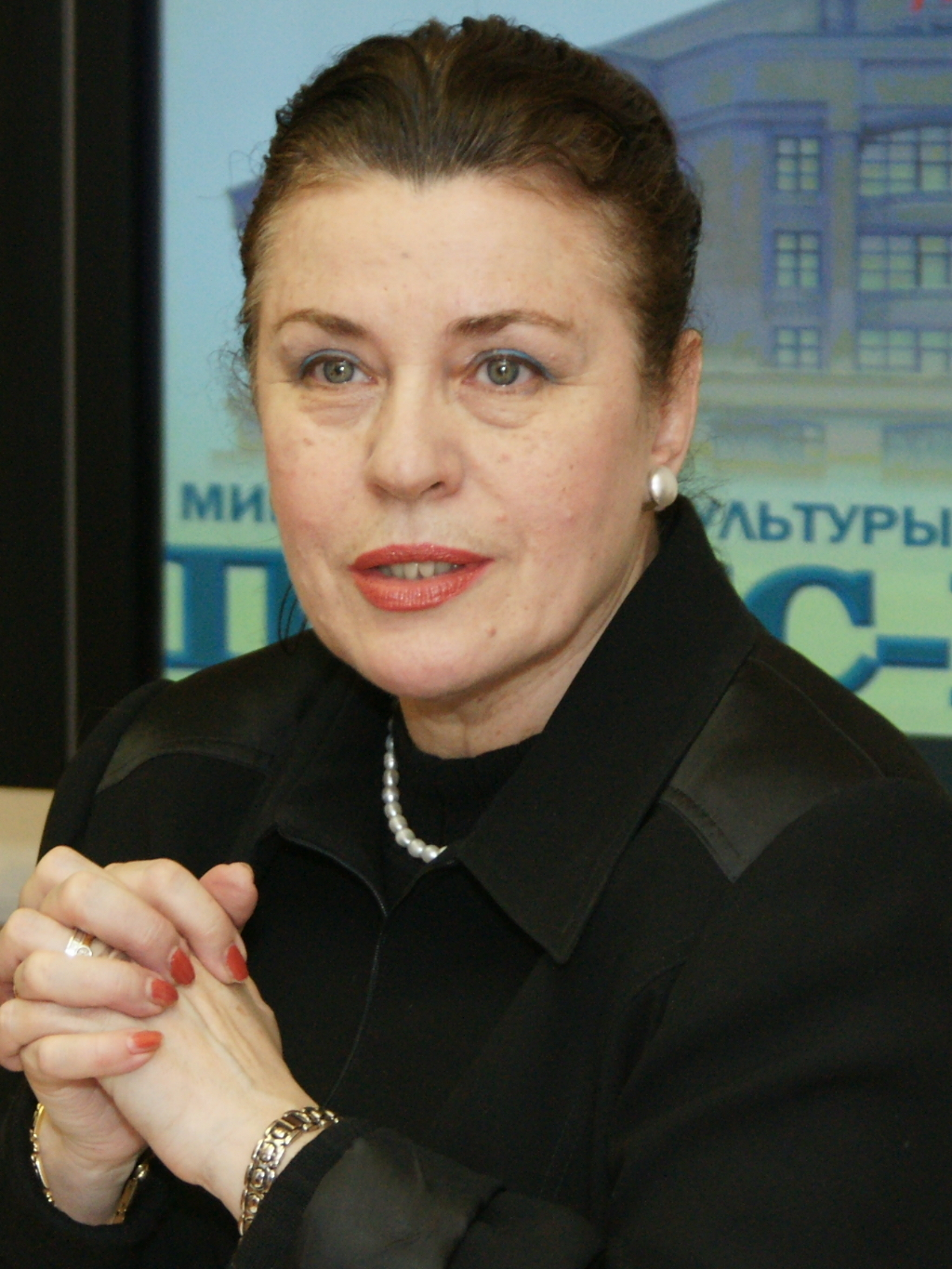
- Valentina Tolkunova in 2008
- Born: Valentina Vasilevna Tolkunova; 12 July 1946; Armavir, Krasnodar Krai, Soviet Union
- Died: 22 March 2010 (aged 63); Moscow, Russia
- Resting place: Troyekurovskoye Cemetery, Moscow
- Education: Moscow State Art and Cultural University
- Title: People’s Artist of the RSFSR (1987)
- Awards: Order of Honour (Russia); Order of Friendship (Russia); Order of Princess Olga (Ukraine,3rd class)
- Musical career
- Origin: Moscow, Soviet Union
- Genres: Pop, Jazz, Chanson, Folk
- Occupation: Singer
- Years active: 1966–2010
- Formerly of: VIO-66

Signature
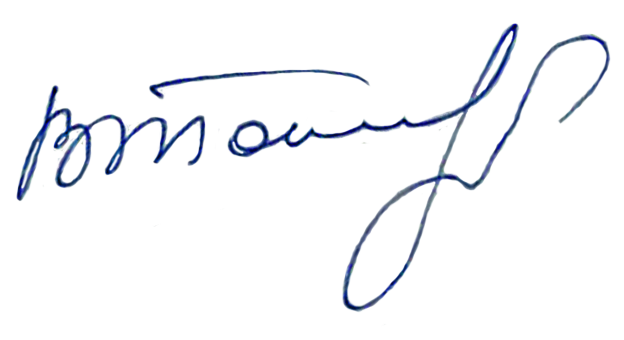

Valentina Vasilevna Tolkunova (Russian: Валенти́на Васи́льевна Толкуно́ва, 12 July 1946 – 22 March 2010) was a Soviet and Russian singer and was bestowed the title of Honored Artist of RSFSR (1979) and People’s Artist of the RSFSR (1987). Her performances exhibited a kindhearted mood and sincerity, and her voice was noted for its clarity.

== Biography ==
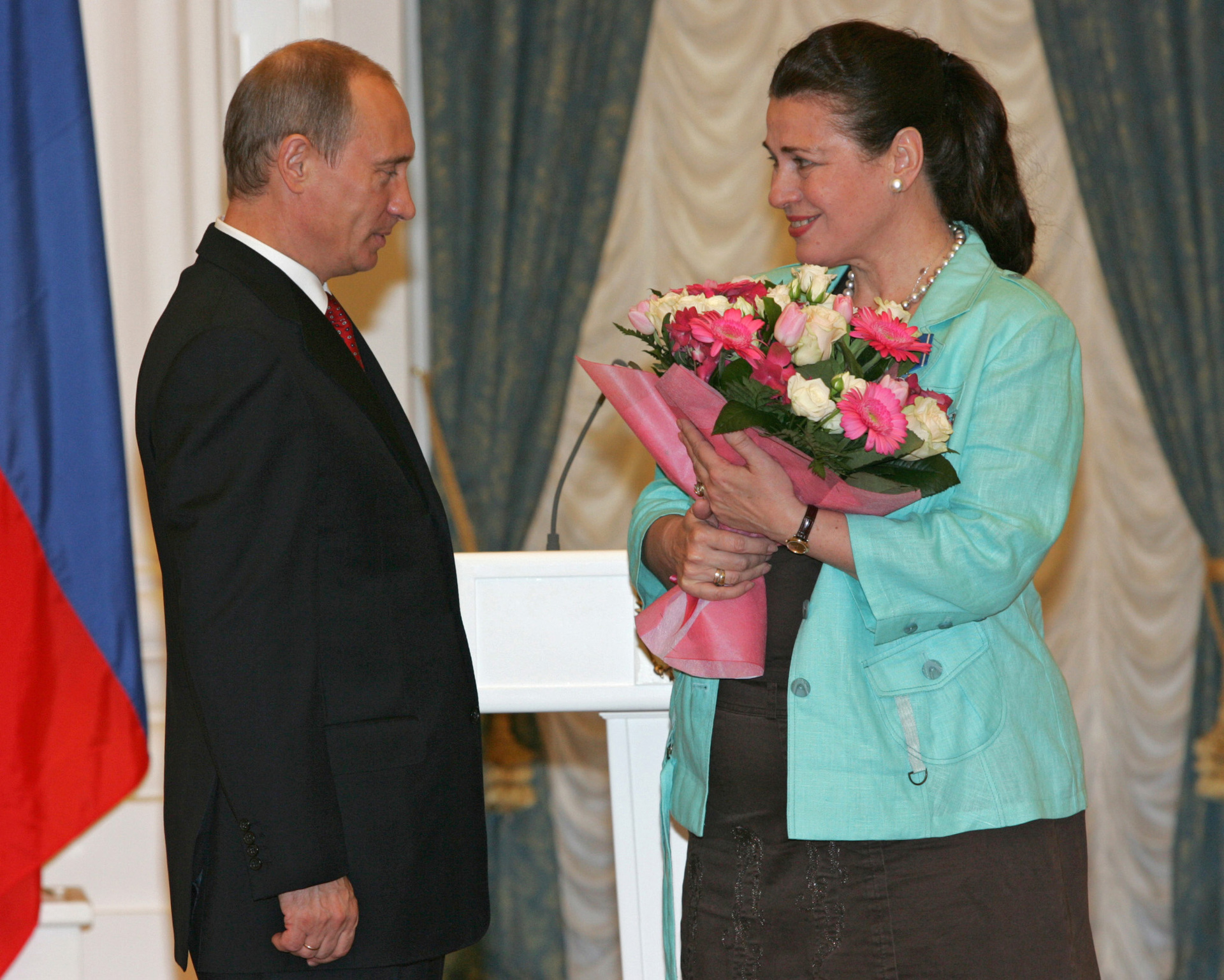
In 2007

At age 18, Valentina Tolkunova entered the Moscow State Art and Cultural University. In 1966, she became a member of Yury Saulsky's jazz band VIO-66 as a soloist and jazz singer. In 1971, she graduated from the Gnessin State Musical College and recorded songs for the TV series Day by Day. The year 1972 was Tolkunova's breakthrough year, due to a noted performance of songs, and marked the beginning of a successful career in radio and TV. In 1973, she began a busy collaboration with the Moscow Philharmonic Concert Association (Moskonzert), and in 1989 she founded and became the director of her own theatre. Over a thirty-year recording career, Valentina Tolkunova released at least thirteen albums. She also won many awards in Soviet republics and was a 23-time winner of the "Song of the Year" competition on television.

On 16 February 2010, Tolkunova became ill during a concert in Mogilev, Belarus, and went to a local hospital where she was diagnosed with brain tumor before being transferred to the Botkin Clinic in Moscow. On 22 March, she went into a coma and died two hours later of a brain tumor.

She was married to Yury Saulsky for 5 years, ending in divorce.

== Discography ==
- 1974 – Valentina Tolkunova (Melodiya М60-35925-26)
- 1974 – V portu (Pesennaya suita) (Melodiya, 33С4711-12); feat. Mark Minkov / Oleg Anofriev
- 1977 – Pesni (Melodiya С60-08497-98)
- 1985 – Razgovor s zhenschinoy (Melodiya С60 22325 003)
- 1990 – Esli b ne bylo voyny (Melodiya C60 29795 001–006)
- 1991 – Seryozha (Melodiya С60 31325 002)
- 1992 – Sorok pyat' (Russian Disc R60 00989)
- 2002 – Moi pridumanniy muzhchina (Soyuz SZCD 1449–02)
- 2010 – Kak byt' schastlivoy

=== Selected songs ===
- Standing on the Train Рlatform (1974)
- Song of Young Neighbors (1984)
- And I See (1984)

== Selected filmography ==
As a singer

- Two hours earlier (На два часа раньше, 1967)
- Cross the threshold (Переступи порог, 1970)
- Dandelion Wine (1971)
- The Summer of Dedov the Soldier (Лето рядового Дедова, 1971)
- Day by Day (1972)
- Summer Dreams (Летние сны, 1972)
- Two on the Way (Двое в пути, 1973)
- Matters of the Heart (1973)
- There Were Three Bachelors (Жили три холостяка, 1973)
- Appointment (Назначение, 1973)
- Different People (Разные люди, 1973)
- The Black Prince (Чёрный принц, 1973)
- Moscow, My Love (1974)
- A Lover's Romance (1974)
- Three Days in Moscow (Три дня в Москве, 1974)
- The Bride From the North (Невеста с севера, 1975)
- Ma-ma (1976)
- Family Celebration Day (День семейного торжества, 1976)
- Soldiers of Freedom (1977)
- Close Distance (Близкая даль, 1978)
- Wormwood is a Bitter Herb (Полынь — трава горькая, 1981)
- Hope and Support (Надежда и опора, 1982)
