= Simon Osiashvili =

Russian poet, singer, & actor (born 1952)

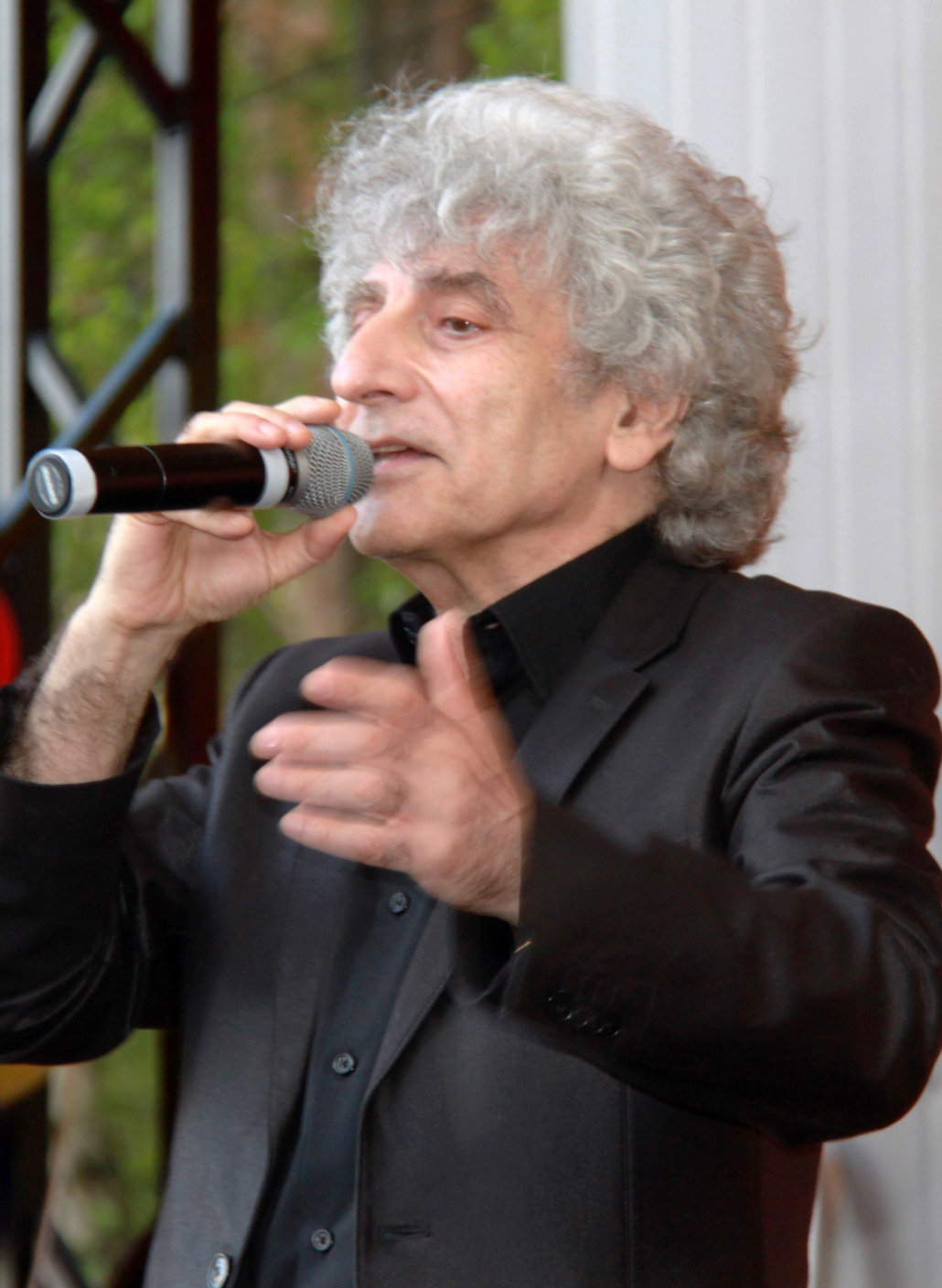

Simon Abramovich Osiashvili (Russian: Симо́н Абрамович Осиашви́ли; born 4 December 1952 in Lviv) is a Russian poet, singer, Honoured Artist of Russia (2002).

Since 1986 to the present time the songs of Simon Osiashvili year are unchanged winners of the TV Festival Pesnya goda. Songwriter for Igor Sarukhanov, Philipp Kirkorov, Vyacheslav Malezhik, Mikhail Boyarsky, Valentina Legkostupova, Yaroslav Yevdokimov, Irina Ponarovskaya and many others.

Member of the professional Russian jury at Eurovision Song Contest 2019.
