= Igor Nikolayev =

Russian composer, singer and song-writer (born 1960)

- Игорь Николаев
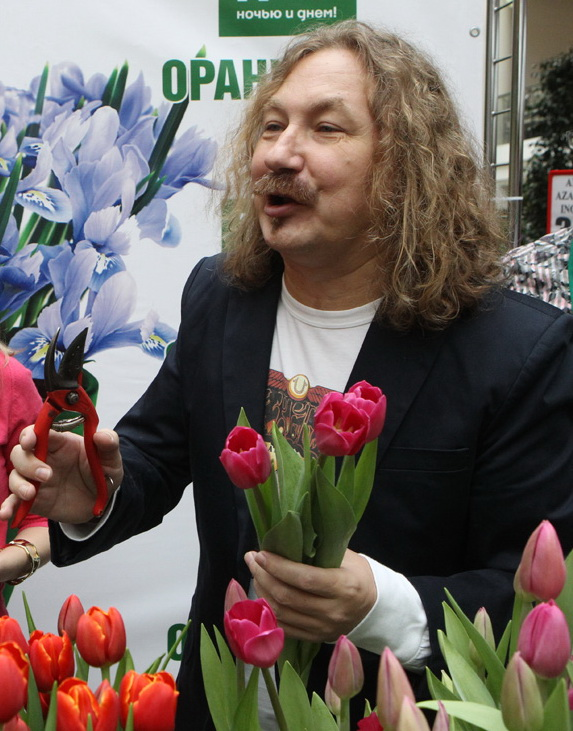
- Nikolayev in 2011
- Born: Igor Yuryevich Nikolayev; 17 January 1960 (age 66); Kholmsk, Sakhalin Oblast, Russian SFSR, USSR (Now Russia)
- Education: Academic Music College
- Occupations: Singer, Composer, Poet
- Years active: 1980s – present
- Known for: Igor [Yuryevich] Nikolayev (Игорь [Юрьевич] Николаев) is known for his songs.
- Children: 2
- Musical career
- Genres: Pop; Blue-eyed soul; Electronic dance
- Instruments: Vocals; Piano; Synthesizer; Guitar
- Website: igornikolaev.ru

Igor Yuryevich Nikolayev (Russian: И́горь Ю́рьевич Никола́ев; born 17 January 1960) is a Russian composer, singer and songwriter.

== Biography ==
Nikolayev was born in Kholmsk, Sakhalin Oblast, into the family of the Sakhalin marinist poet Yury Nikolayev. He graduated from the pop branch (class of the composer Igor Yakushenko) of the Moscow Institute of Culture. In the early 1980s, he worked in Alla Pugacheva's ensemble "Recital" as a keyboardist and arranger. In 1983, Pugacheva and Nikolayev recorded the songs "Iceberg" and "Tell, Birds!", which established him as a celebrated composer. He has a daughter, Yulia Igorevna Nikolaeva, from his first marriage. His second marriage was to the singer Natasha Koroleva. He has a further daughter, Veronika Igorevna Nikolaeva, from his second marriage to the singer Yulia Proskuryakova, who in 2021 attracted public attention after insulting a neighbour who had occupied her parking space.

== Solo career ==
His solo singing career began in 1986, with the release of his debut song, "Mill". He was the recipient of the national music award "Ovation 1995" in the category "Composer".

Nikolayev has won a number of prestigious music awards. These include: "Ovation-92", for the album Dolphin and Mermaid; "Ovation-95", in the nomination Composer of the Year; "Ovation-97", in the nomination Poet of the Year; "Ovation-99", in the nomination Composer of the Year; "Song-99", for his outstanding contribution to the development of song (the Isaak Dunayevsky Prize); the "Golden Gramophone Award-2001", for the song "Five Reasons"; and "Best Composer in 2002", a prize awarded at the "Pesnya Goda" festival.

In 2004, he served as a composer on Star Factory 4.

== Popular songs ==
- "Iceberg" (Russian: Айсберг) by Alla Pugacheva
- "Ozero nadezhdy" (Russian: Озеро надежды, Hope Lake) by Alla Pugacheva
- "Ne obijay menya" (Russian: Не обижай меня) by Alla Pugacheva
- "Paromshik" (Russian: Паромщик) by Alla Pugacheva
- "Rasskazhite, ptitsy" (Russian: Расскажите, птицы) by Alla Pugacheva
- "Parahody" (Russian: Пароходы) by Valery Leontiev
- "Tri minuty" (Russian: Три минуты, Three Minutes) by Valery Leontiev
- "Komarovo" (Russian: Комарово) by Igor Sklyar
- "Strannik Moy" (Russian: Странник мой) by Irina Allegrova
- "Zheltye Tyulpani" (Russian: Жёлтые тюльпаны) by Natasha Koroleva
- "Malenkaya strana" (Russian: Маленькая страна, Little Country) by Natasha Koroleva
- "Kievskiy mal'chishka" (Russian: Киевский мальчишка, Kiev Boy) by Natasha Koroleva
- "Ya Ne Rafael" (Russian: Я не Рафаэль, I Am Not Raphael) by Philipp Kirkorov
- "Nemnogo zhal" (Russian: Немного жаль) by Philipp Kirkorov
- "Vip'em Za Lyubov" (Russian: Выпьем за любовь, Let's Drink to Love)
- "Dve Zvezdy" (Russian: Две звезды, Two Stars) by Alla Pugacheva and Vladimir Kuzmin
- "Staraya Melnitsa" (Russian: Старая мельница)
- "Taxi, Taxi" (Russian: Такси, такси)
- "Den Rojdeniya" (Russian: День рождения, Birthday)
- "Master and Margarita" (Russian: Мастер и Маргарита)
- "Volshebnoye steklo moyey dushi" (Russian: Волшебное стекло моей души, The Magic Glass of My Soul) by Diana Gurtskaya
- "Piano in the Night" (Russian: Рояль в ночи)
- "Kingdom of Crooked Mirrors" (Russian: Королевство кривых зеркал)
- "You Do Not Know How Beautiful You Are" (Russian: Ты даже не знаешь, как ты прекрасна)

== Discography ==
- 1986 — Счастья в личной жизни (Alla Pugacheva) (Good Luck in the Personal Life!)
- 1987 — Мельница (Mill)
- 1989 — Королевство кривых зеркал (Kingdom Of Crooked Mirrors)
- 1989 — Фантастика (Fantasy)
- 1989 — Kingdom of Carnival Mirrors, Sweden
- 1989 — Aqarius 1999 (Lisa Nilsson), Sweden
- 1989 — Julen Är Här (Tommy Körberg), Sweden
- 1990 — Жёлтые тюльпаны Natalya Koroleva (Yellow Tulips)
- 1991 — Мисс разлука (Ms. Separation)
- 1992 — Дельфин и русалка (The Dolphin and the Mermaid)
- 1992 — Странник мой Irina Allegrova (My Stranger)
- 1994 — Малиновое вино (Raspberry Wine)
- 1994 — Поклонник Natalya Koroleva ("Admirer")
- 1995 — Конфетти Natalya Koroleva ("Confetti")
- 1995 — Выпьем за любовь (Let's Toast to Love)
- 1997 — Пятнадцать лет. Лучшие песни (15 Years. The Best Songs)
- 1997 — Бриллианты слёз Natalya Koroleva (Diamonds Of Tears)
- 1998 — Игорь Николаев-98 (Igor Nikolaev-98)
- 2000 — Разбитая чашка любви (The Broken Cup Of Love)
- 2001 — Самая родная (The Dearest)
- 2001 — Дочка …и я (feat. Yulia Nikolaeva) (The Daughter ...And I)
- 2002 — Прости и отпусти (Forgive And Let Go)
- 2004 — ЗДРАВСТВУЙ (HELLO)
- 2004 — Миллион красивых женщин (compilation) (Million Of Beautiful Women)
- 2006 — Как ты прекрасна ( How Beautiful You are)
- 2006 — Просто всё прошло (Everything has ended)
- 2006 — Лучшие песни. Новая коллекция (Best songs. New collection)
- 2010 — Игорь Николаев и Юлия Проскурякова: Новые песни (Igor Nikolaev and Yulia Proskuryakova: New Songs)
- 2010 — Англоязычные песни Игоря Николаева (Igor Nikolaev's English-language songs)
- 2014 — Линия жизни (Lifeline)
