= Pesnya goda =

Pesnya Goda
- Location: Moscow
- Country: Russia
- Presented by: Angelina Vovk and Yevgeni Menshov
- Rewards: all laureates receive a diploma, the main category winner receives the Pesnya Goda award trophy
- First award: 1971; 55 years ago

Television/radio coverage
- Network: Channel One Russia (1995–2004); NTV (2005); Russia-1 (2006–present)

Pesnya goda (Russian: Песня года), meaning Song of the Year, is an annual televised music festival and gala in Russia, honoring standout songs from the previous year. The event began in the Soviet period, and prior to the dissolution of the USSR also included songs in languages other than Russian.

First held in 1971, it became the main event of the year for Soviet singers and musical groups. Pesnya goda is traditionally recorded in December and aired on television in early January, as part of the New Year's festivities. Programme One (later Channel One Russia) was the official broadcaster through 2004; the festival is now broadcast on Russia 1.

== History ==
In many ways, the history of Pesnya goda mirrored the history of the former Soviet Union. The songs selected for the initial festivals were strictly censored and required to be consistent with the social norms established by the Communist Party. The performers were all conservatory graduates in good standing with pristine reputations and conservative looks; the same case fell also for the VIAs whose songs were also featured. Over time as Soviet society became more liberal and in the 1980s during the era of perestroika, the festival began to include a broader range of musical styles, song lyrics, and performers. In 1971 and 1972 it aired in black and white and via videotape; starting 1973, the program was prerecorded in color, and today is shot in digital video and high definition.

In the 1990s, after the collapse of the Soviet Union, the Pesnya goda festival was reborn in 1993 and became part of the new society's New Year's tradition, providing an escape from the harsh socioeconomic realities of life in Russia in the 1990s. In the 2000s, the festival became a television extravaganza featuring the most commercially successful and popular artists of Russian pop and rock music. In 2021, the festival's 50th anniversary, Pesnya goda held a special golden jubilee event.

All performers included in the televised final of the festival are considered "winners" and referred to as such in the media. The two performers that have received the most inclusions in Pesnya goda are Lev Leshchenko, who appeared in 49 finals (each year from 1971 to 2023, except for 1989, 2005, and 2007), and Sofia Rotaru, who was in 47 festival each year from 1973 to 2021, except for 2002. Other artists that have been perennial Pesnya goda winners include Iosif Kobzon (41 times), Valery Leontiev, Valentina Tolkunova, Edita Piekha, Laima Vaikule, Igor Nikolayev, Irina Allegrova and Alla Pugacheva. The first rap song featured in the festival came in 2019, with the rap performance of Russian pop-singer Egor Kreed (with popular singer Philip Kirkorov).

The best known hosts of the festival are Angelina Vovk and Evgueny Menishov, who hosted it from 1988 until 2006; Anna Shilova and Igor Kirillov, who hosted it from 1971 until 1975; and Svetlana Zhiltsova and Alexander Maslyakov, who hosted it from 1976 until 1979. The most recent hosts are Lera Kudryavtseva and Sergey Lazarev, who have hosted since 2007.

Until 1991, the festival was hosted at the Ostankino Technical Center Concert Hall, with exception of 1985 when it was held at the Dynamo Sports Palace. After the dissolution of the Soviet Union, Pesnya goda was held at the State Kremlin Palace (1993–1997, 1999-2003 and 2005), Cosmos Hotel Concert Hall (1998), Rossiya Central Concert Hall (2004), Olimpiyskiy Sports Complex (2006–2018), VTB Arena (2019–2020) and Megasport Sport Palace (since 2021).

== Records and statistics ==
=== Appearances in finals ===
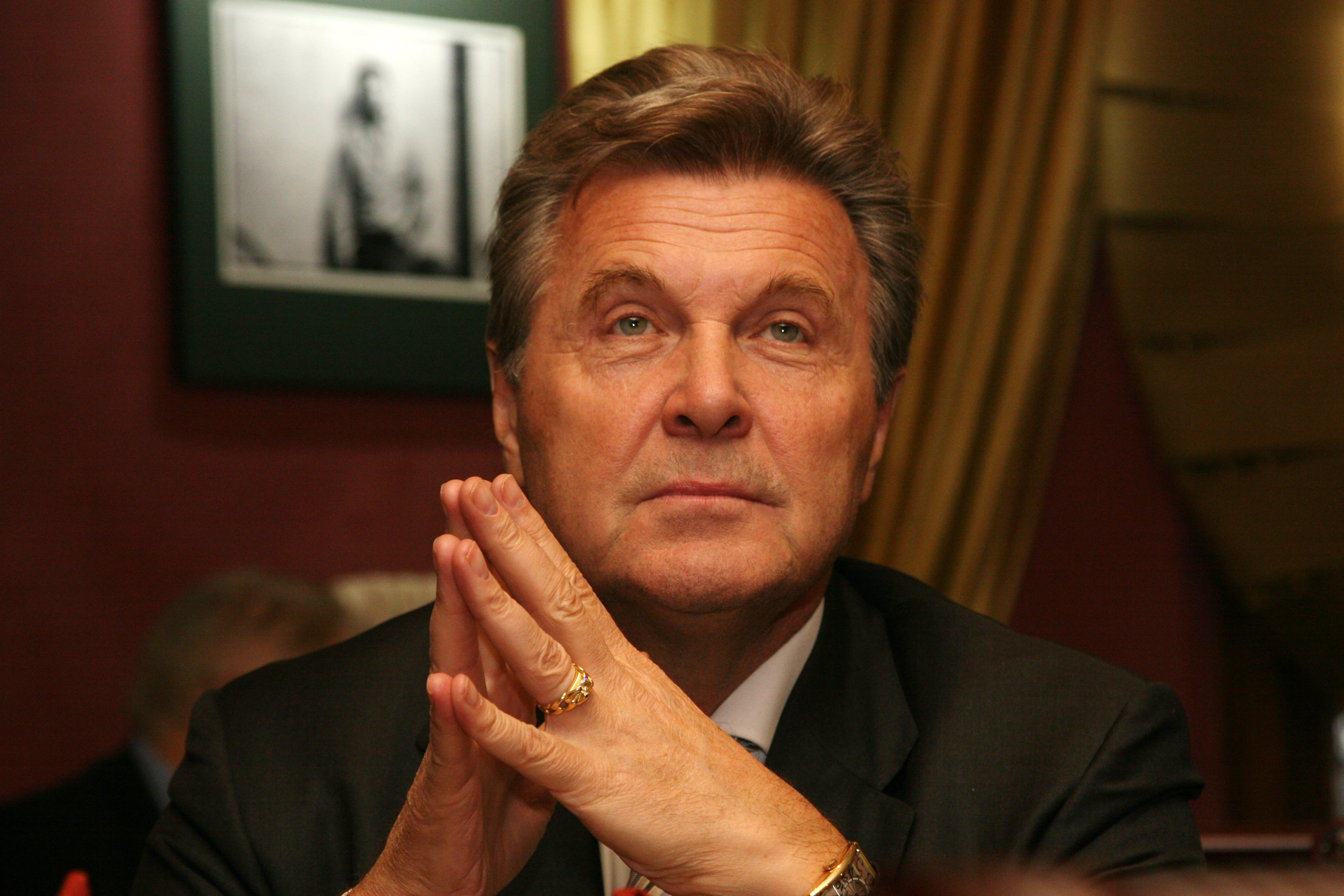
Lev Leshchenko, 49 Finals.

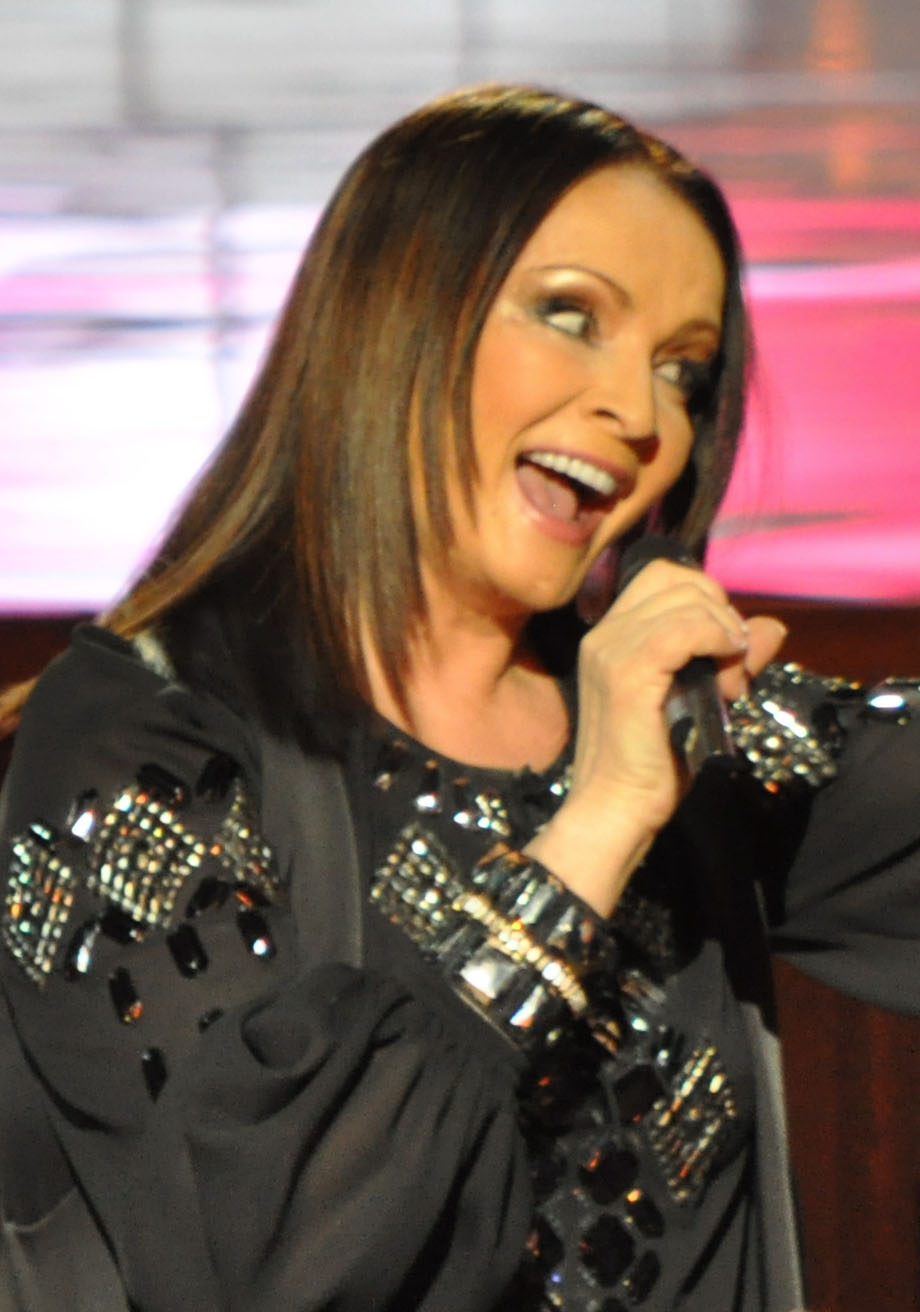
Sofia Rotaru, 47 Finals.

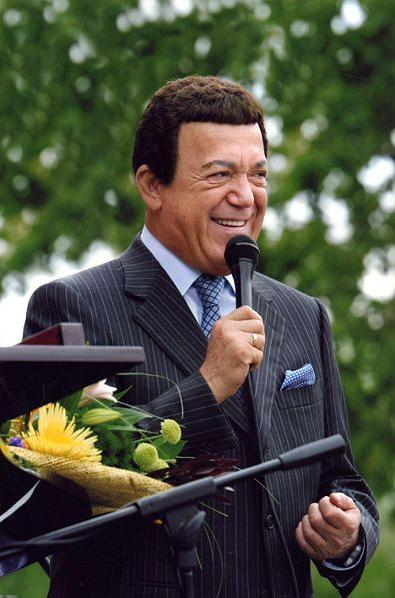
Joseph Kobzon (1937–2018), 41 Finals.

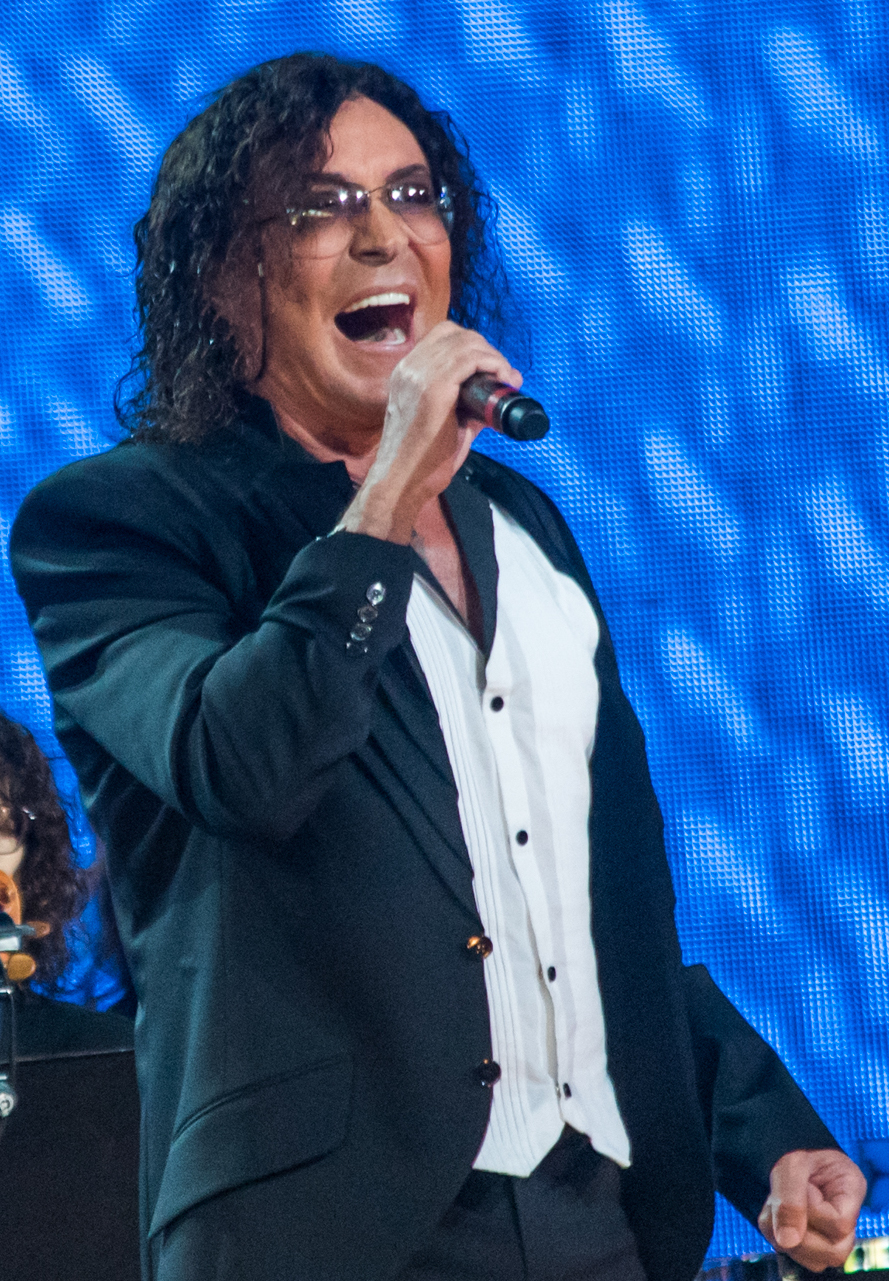
Valery Leontiev, 39 Finals

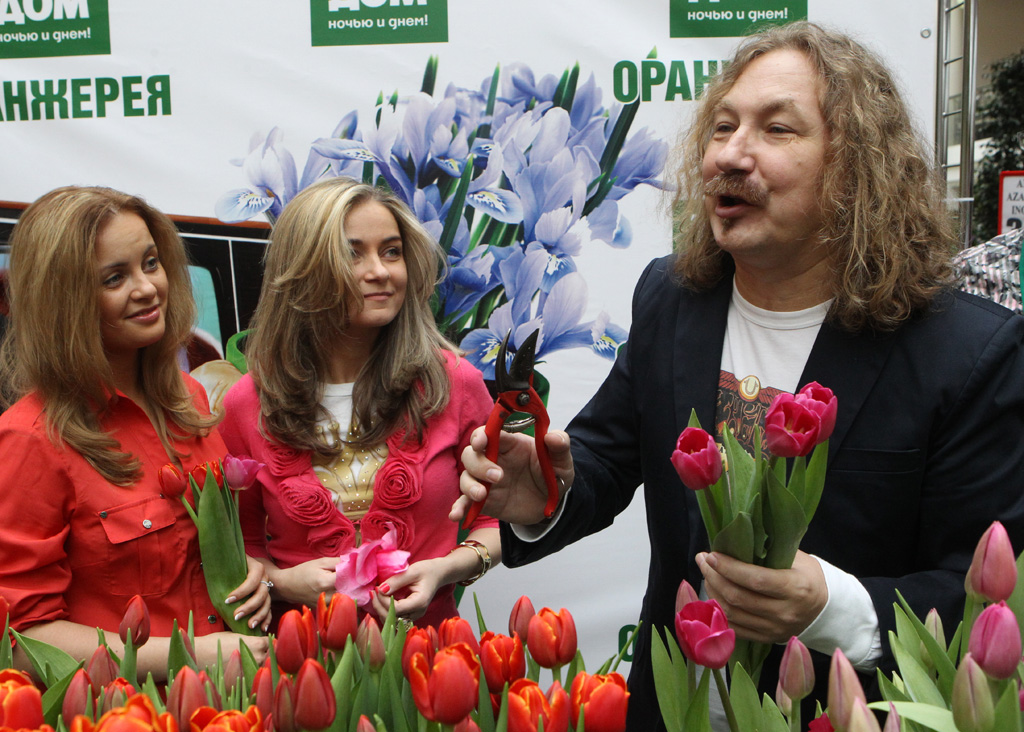
Igor Nikolayev, 32 Finals.

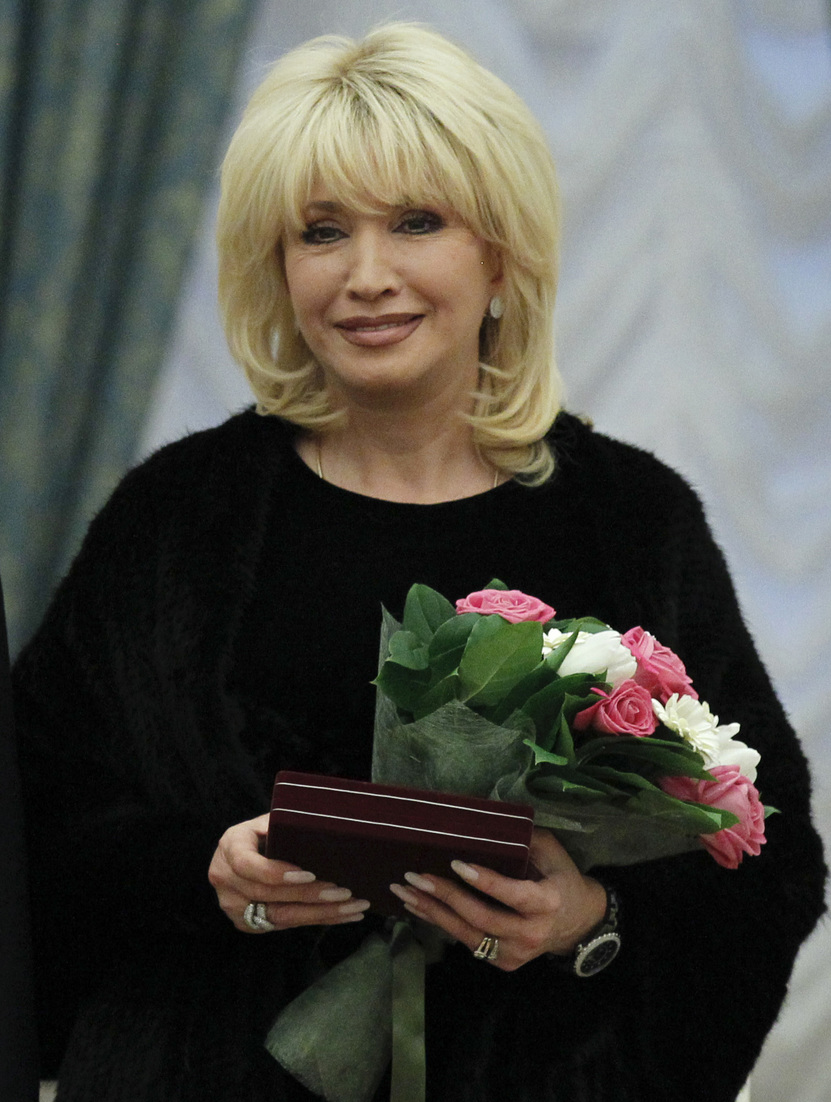
Irina Allegrova, 31 Finals.

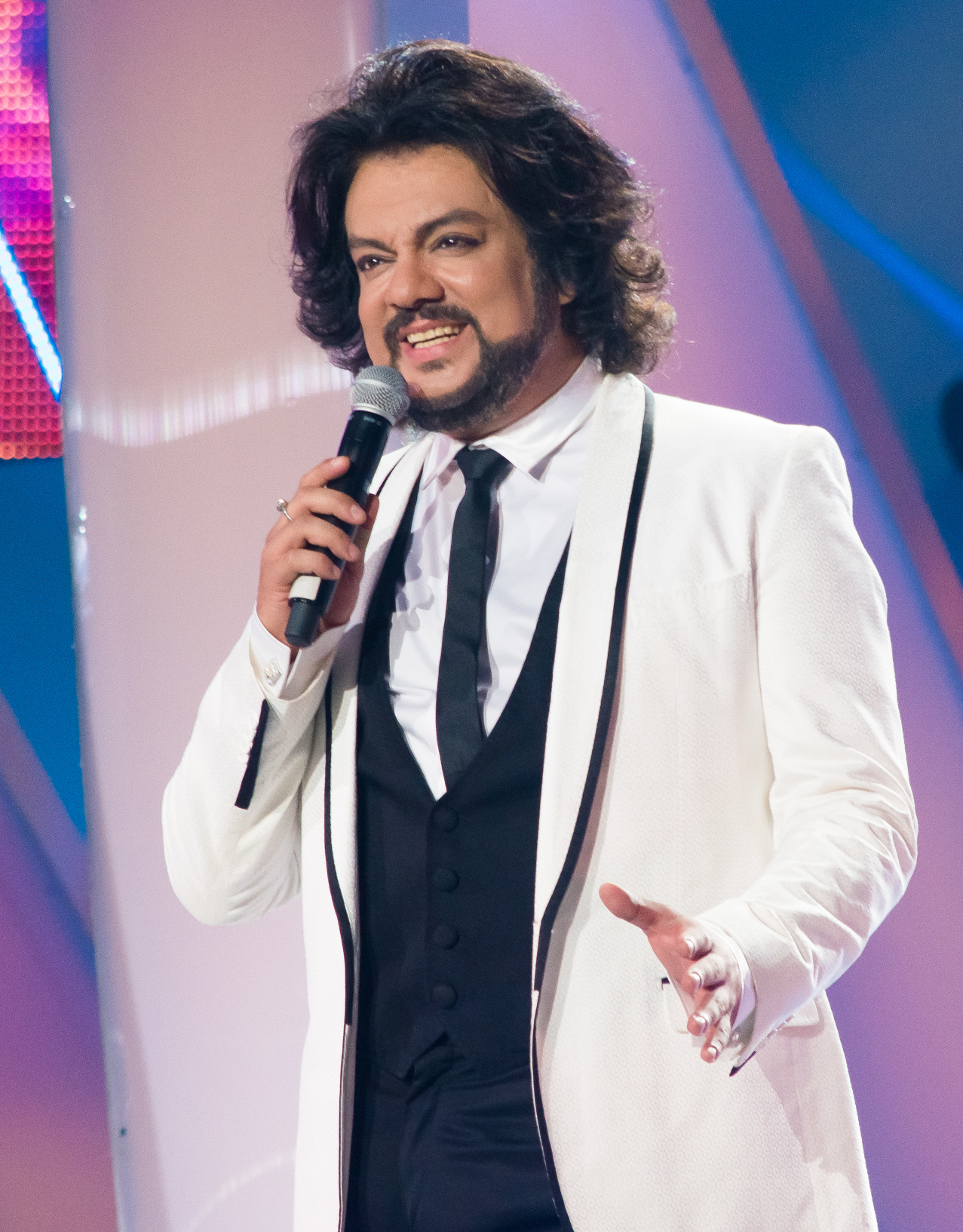
Philipp Kirkorov, 30 Finals

NO.	Name	Finals appearances as of 2023 Finals
1	Lev Leshchenko	49
2	Sophia Rotaru	47
3	Joseph Kobzon	41
4	Valery Leontiev	39
5	Igor Nikolayev	32
6	Irina Allegrova	31
7	Philipp Kirkorov	30
8	Leonid Agutin	29
9	Larisa Dolina	28
10	Laima Vaikule	27
10	Anzhelika Varum	27
10	Oleg Gazmanov	27
13	Alexander Buinov	26
14	Valentina Tolkunova	25
15	Valery Meladze	24
15	Kristina Orbakaitė	24
17	Edita Piekha	22
17	Aleksander Serov	22
17	Nikolay Baskov	22
20	Vyacheslav Dobrynin	21
20	Valeriya	21
22	Alla Pugacheva	20
23	Alsou	19
23	Sergey Lazarev	19
25	Diskoteka Avariya	18
25	Dmitry Malikov	18
25	Dima Bilan	18
28	Natasha Koroleva	17
29	A-Studio	16
29	Jasmin	16
31	Alexander Malinin	15
32	Nadezhda Babkina	14
32	Boris Moiseev	14
34	Muslim Magomayev	12
34	Big Children's Choir	12
34	Lyube	12
34	Tatiana Ovsyenko	12

== See also ==
- List of historic rock festivals
