= Odintsov =

Odintsov (masculine, Russian: Одинцов) or Odintsova (feminine, Russian: Одинцова) is a Russian surname. It is a patronymic surname derived from the nickname одинец literally meaning "single person", e.g., a single son, a peasant without family. Ukrainian-language spelling: Odyntsov. Notable people with the surname include:

- Anna Odintsova, Russian ballet dancer, prima ballerina
- Mikhail Odintsov (1921—2011), Russian journalist, writer, and military pilot
- Sergei Odintsov (born 1959), Russian astrophysicist
- Yevhen Odyntsov (born 1986), Ukrainian soccer player

== See also ==
- Odinets
- Odintsov, Belgorod Oblast, village in Russia
