= People's Artist of Russia =

Russian performing arts award

People's Artist of the Russian Federation
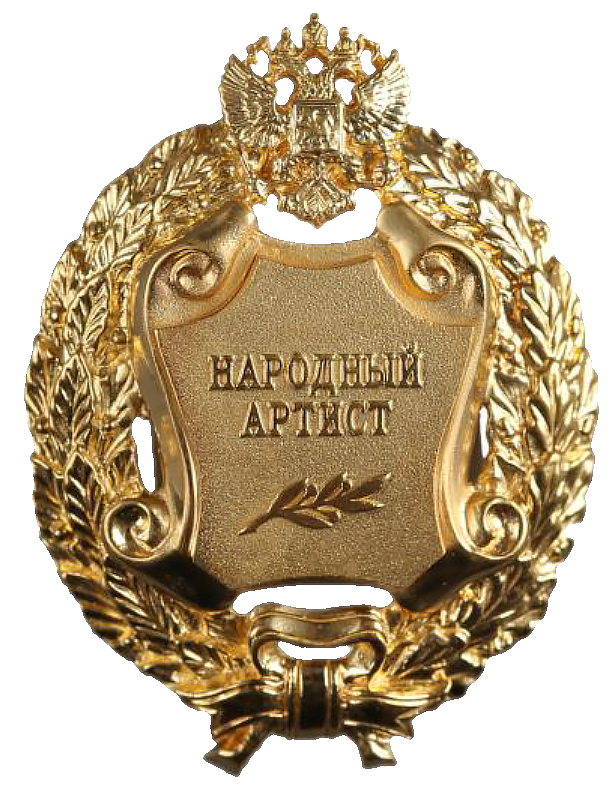
- Awarded for: Outstanding achievements in the performing arts
- Country: Russian Federation
- Presented by: President of Russia
- First award: February 21, 1992; 34 years ago

People's Artist of the Russian Federation (Russian: Народный артист Российской Федерации, Narodnyy artist Rossiyskoy Federatsii), also sometimes translated as National Artist of the Russian Federation, is an honorary and the highest title awarded to citizens of the Russian Federation, all outstanding in the performing arts, whose merits are exceptional in the sphere of the development of the performing arts (theatre, music, dance, circus, cinema, etc.).

It succeeded both the all-Soviet Union "People's Artist of the USSR" award (Народный артист СССР), and more directly the local republic's "People's Artist of the RSFSR" award (Народный артист РСФСР), after the dissolution of the Soviet Union. Now, the status of the People's Artist of the Russian Federation has risen above that of the earlier RSFSR award.

There are presently two levels to this award:

- The lower Honored Artist of Russia (Заслуженный артист Zasluzhenniy artist) also translates as "Meritorious Artist". This was equivalent to the earlier «Заслуженный артист РСФСР», which became «Заслуженный артист Российской Федерации».
- The higher People's Artist of Russia (Народный артист России, Narodny artist) is the highest honorary title of the Russian Federation for outstanding achievements in the field of theater, music, circus, vaudeville, and film art.

Receiving the lower "Honored" (Заслуженный, Zasluzhenniy artist) award makes the recipient eligible to receive the higher "People's" (Народный, Narodny) award at a later time. For example, the light entertainment singer Sergei Zakharov was awarded Honored Artist of the RSFSR (Заслуженный артист РСФСР) in 1988, then People's Artist of Russia (Народный артист России) in 1996.

== Categories awarded ==
The awards may be issued to people working in the following fields:

- Teacher
- Artist
- Agronomist
- Architect
- Chemist
- Miner
- Veterinarian
- Military Pilot
- Military Expert
- Military Navigator
- Doctor
- Geologist
- Scientist
- Land surveyor
- Husbandry
- Inventor
- Designer
- Forester
- Test Pilot
- Mechanic
- Metallurgist
- Meteorologist
- Border Guard
- Community services worker
- Foreign Service Employee
- Health Worker
- Cultural Worker
- Forestry Worker
- Oil & Gas Industry Worker
- Employee of the Food Industry
- Employee of the Aerospace Industry

Other professionals are open to attaining the title as well as those listed.

== Gallery ==
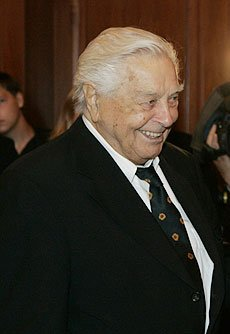
Stage actor Yuri Lyubimov

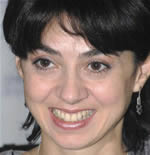
Ballet dancer Nina Ananiashvili

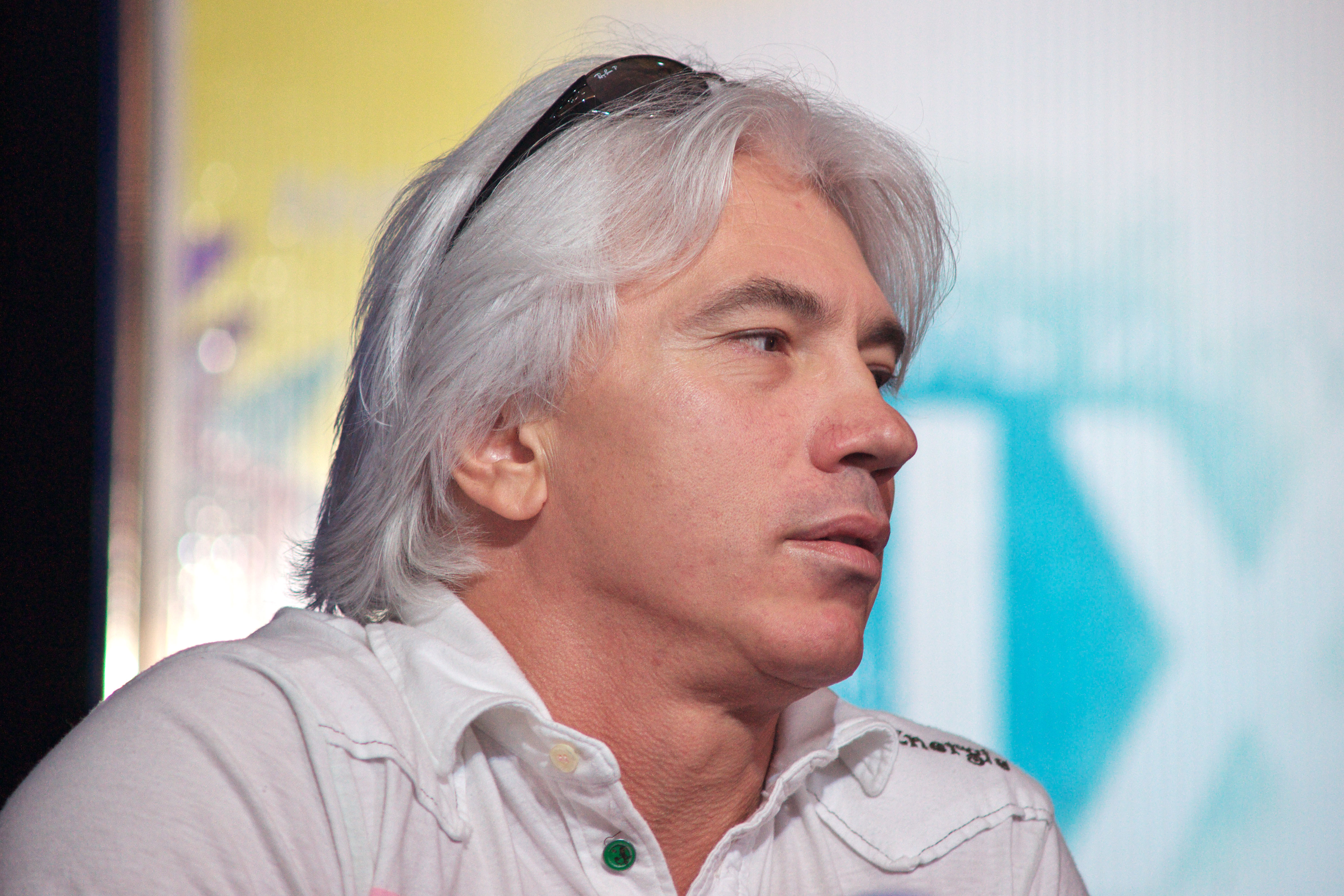
Operatic singer Dmitri Hvorostovsky

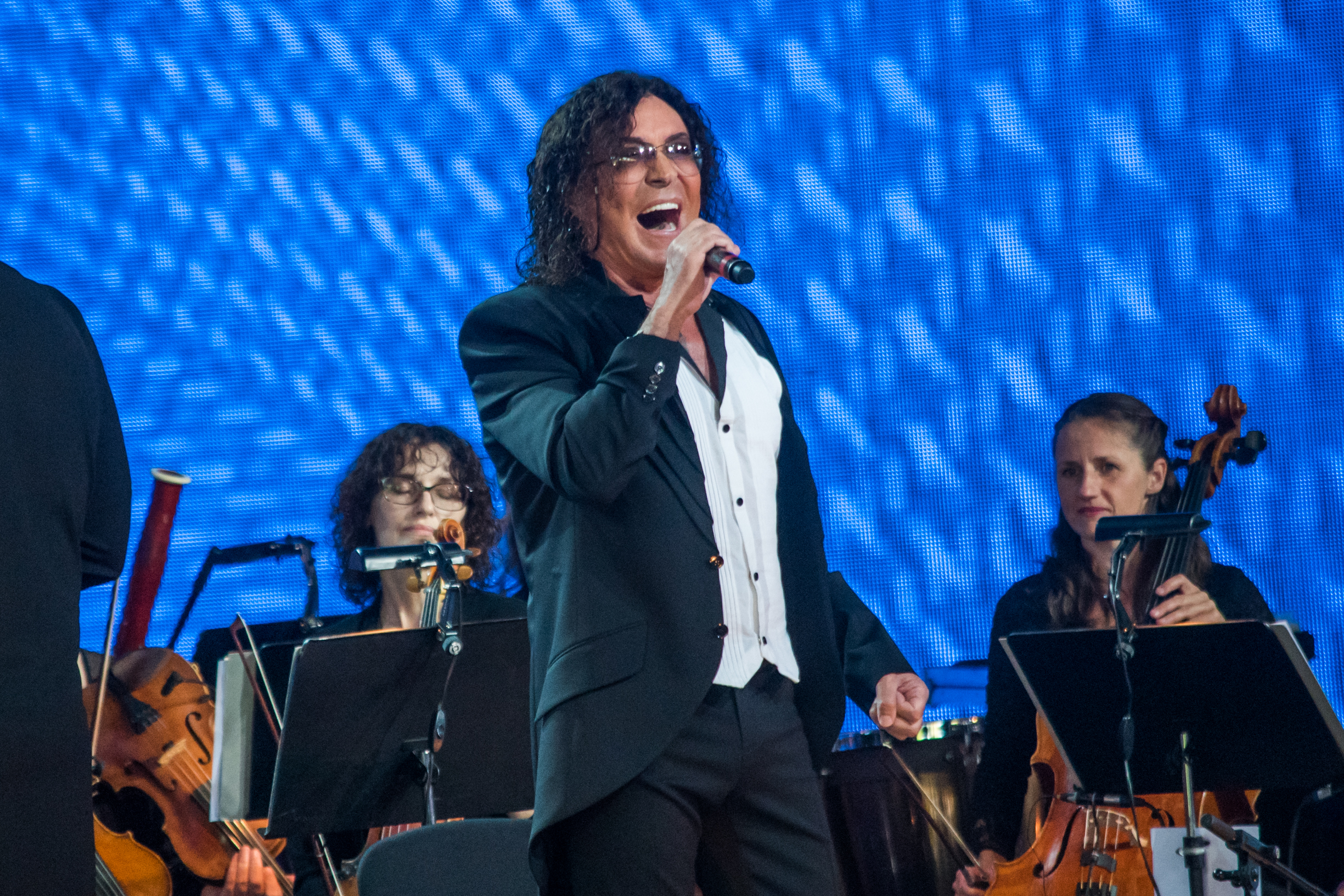
Singer Valery Leontiev

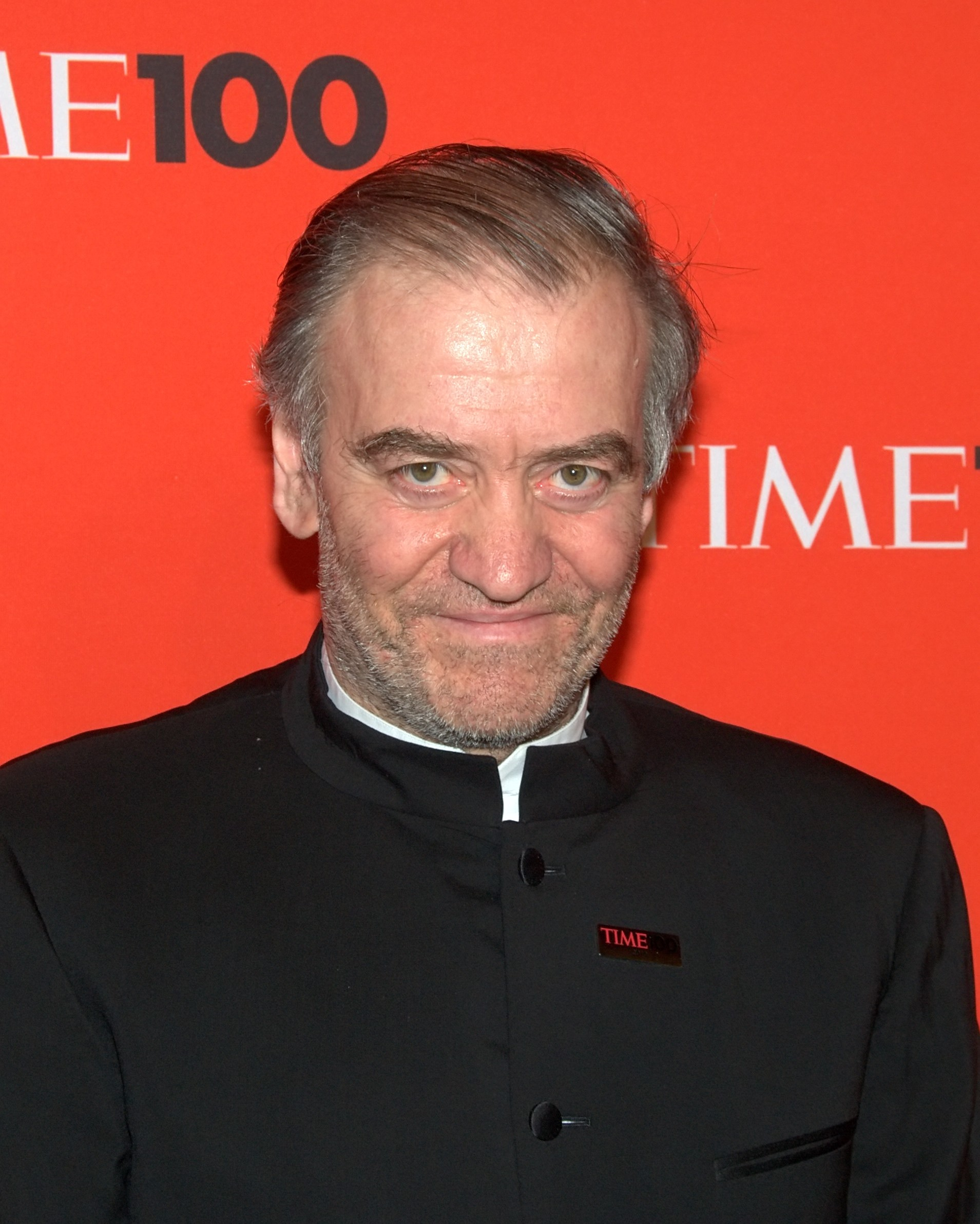
Conductor Valery Gergiev

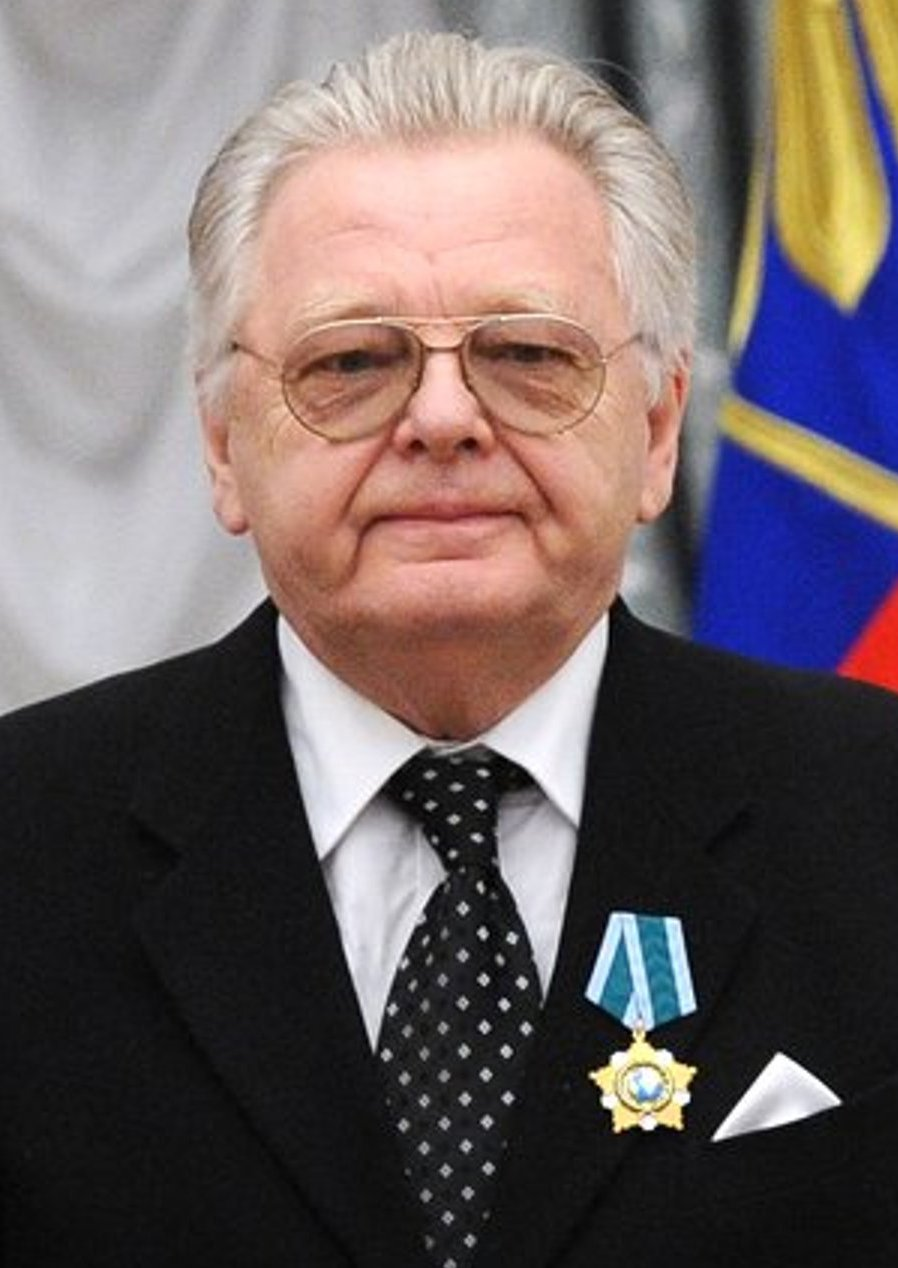
Composer and singer Yuri Antonov

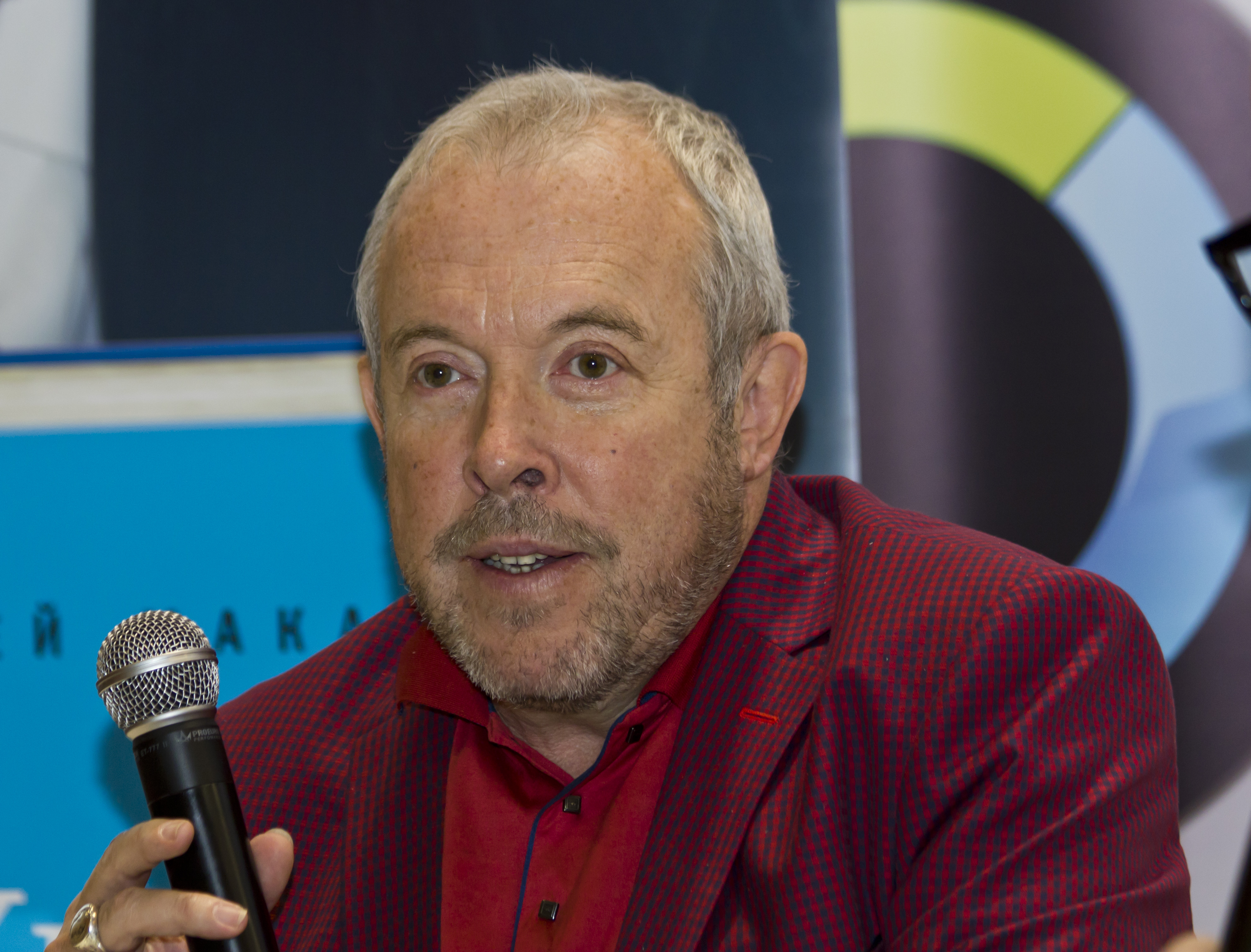
Musician Andrey Makarevich

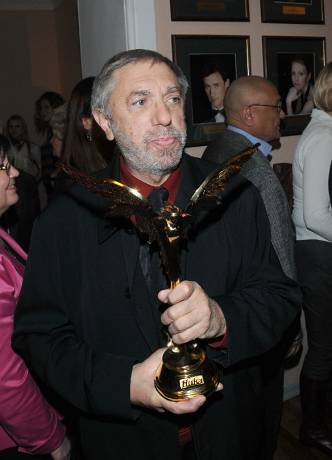
Composer Eduard Artemyev

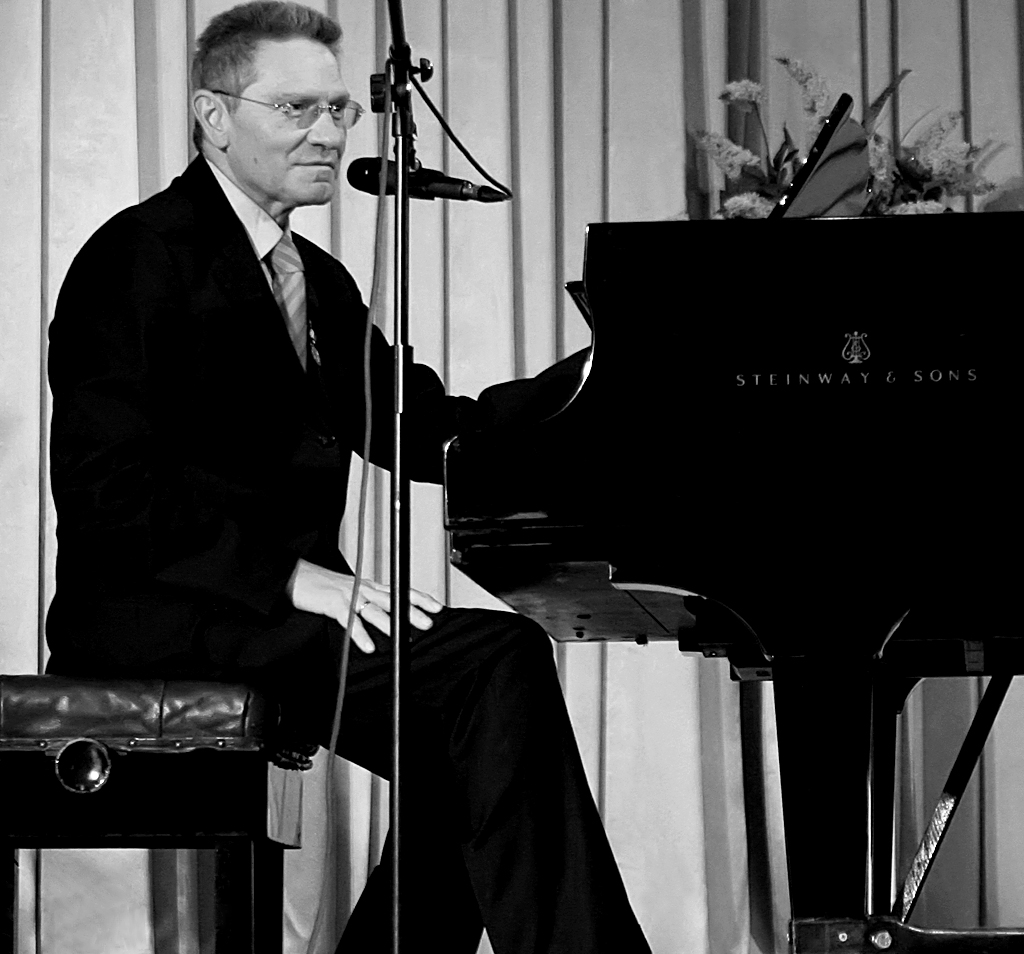
Composer David Tukhmanov

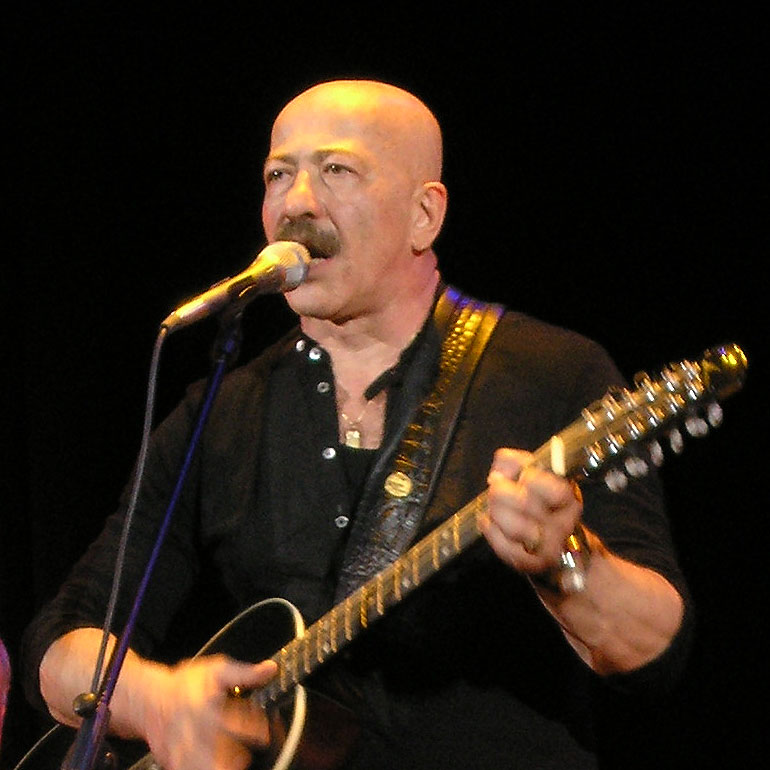
Bard Alexander Rosenbaum

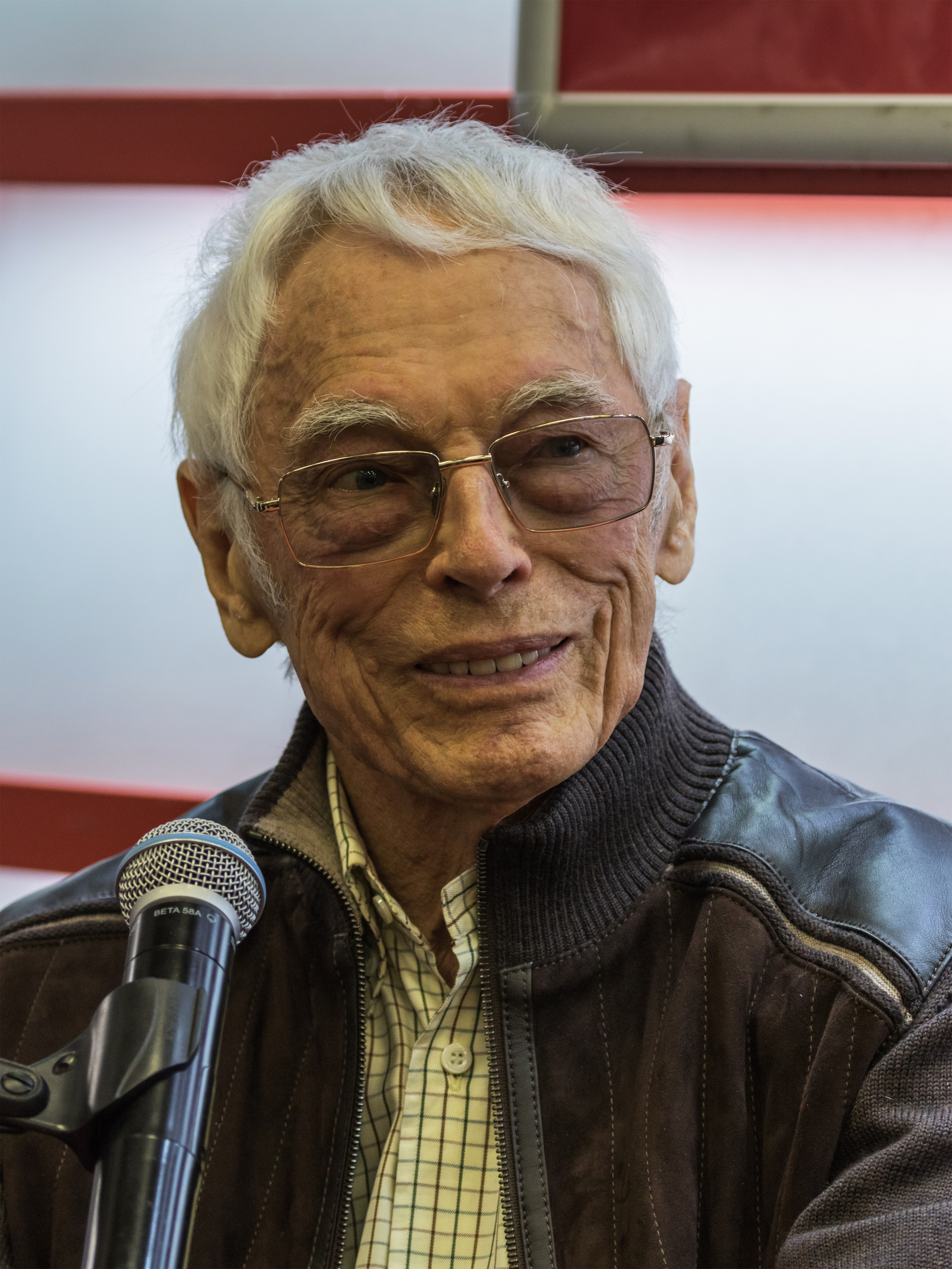
Composer Aleksandr Zatsepin

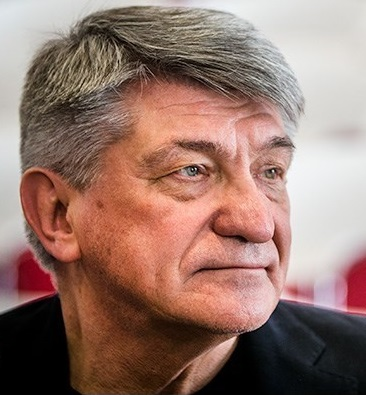
Filmmaker Alexander Sokurov

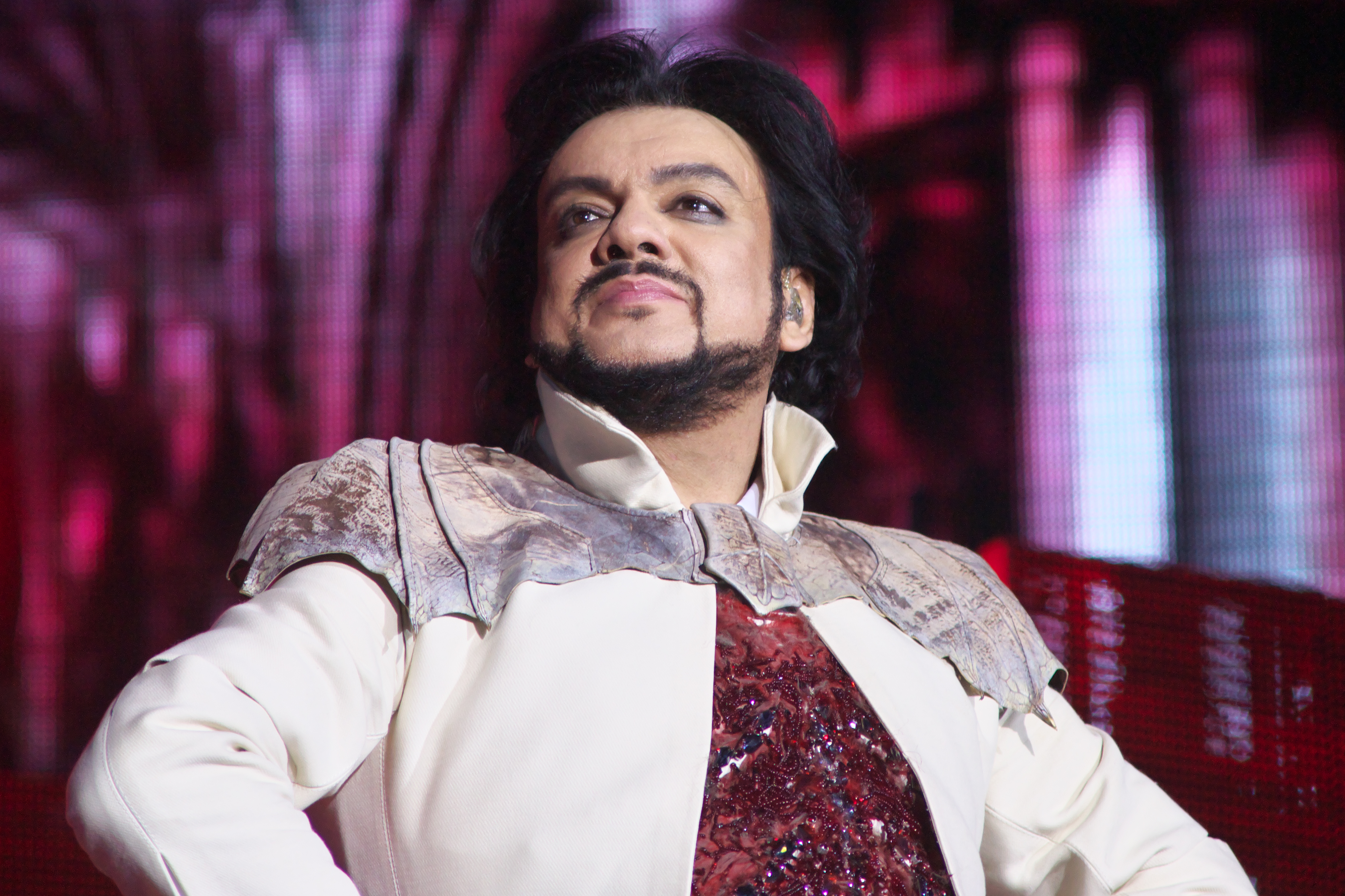
Singer Philipp Kirkorov

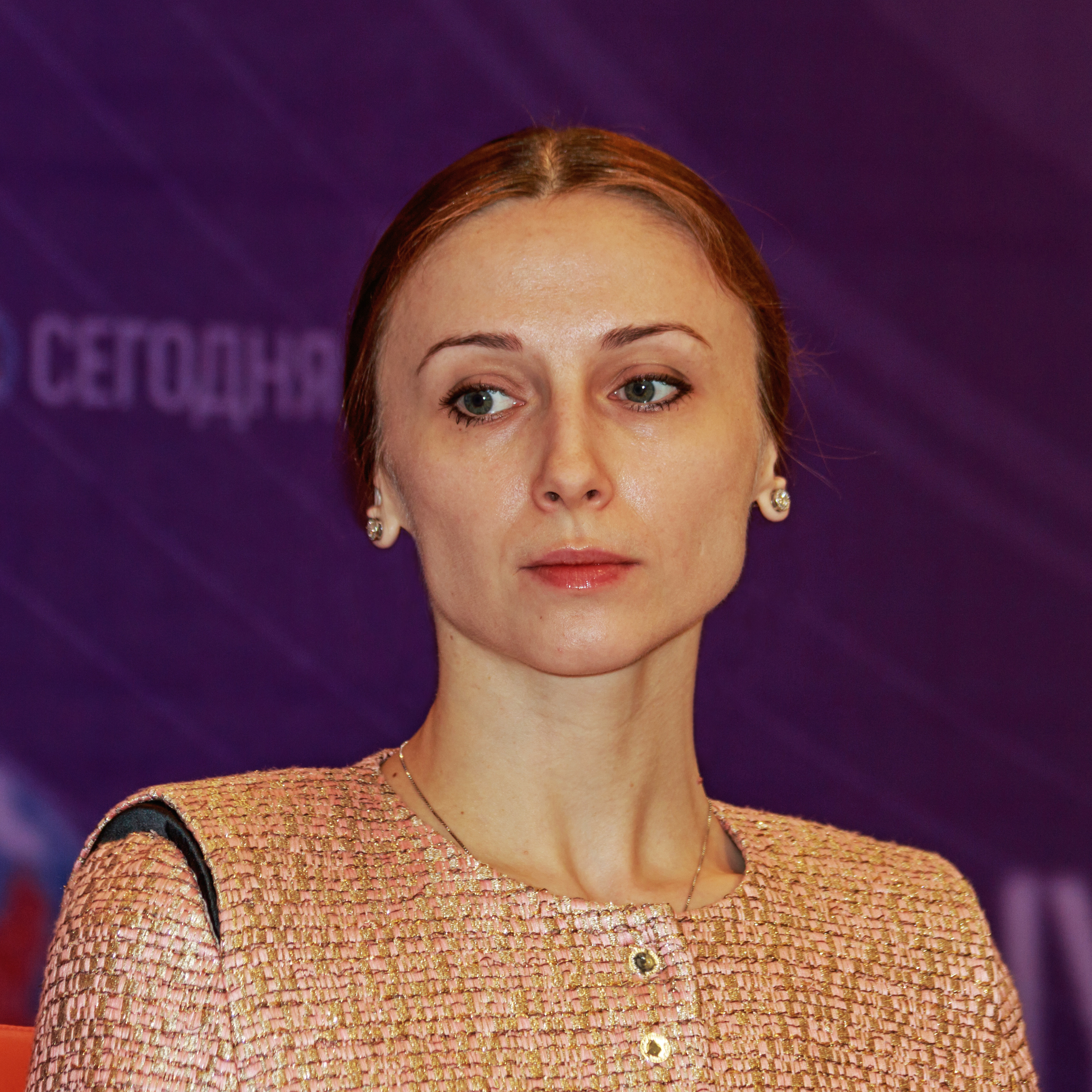
Ballet dancer Svetlana Zakharova

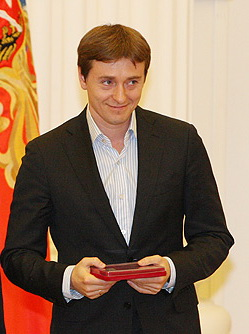
Actor Sergey Bezrukov

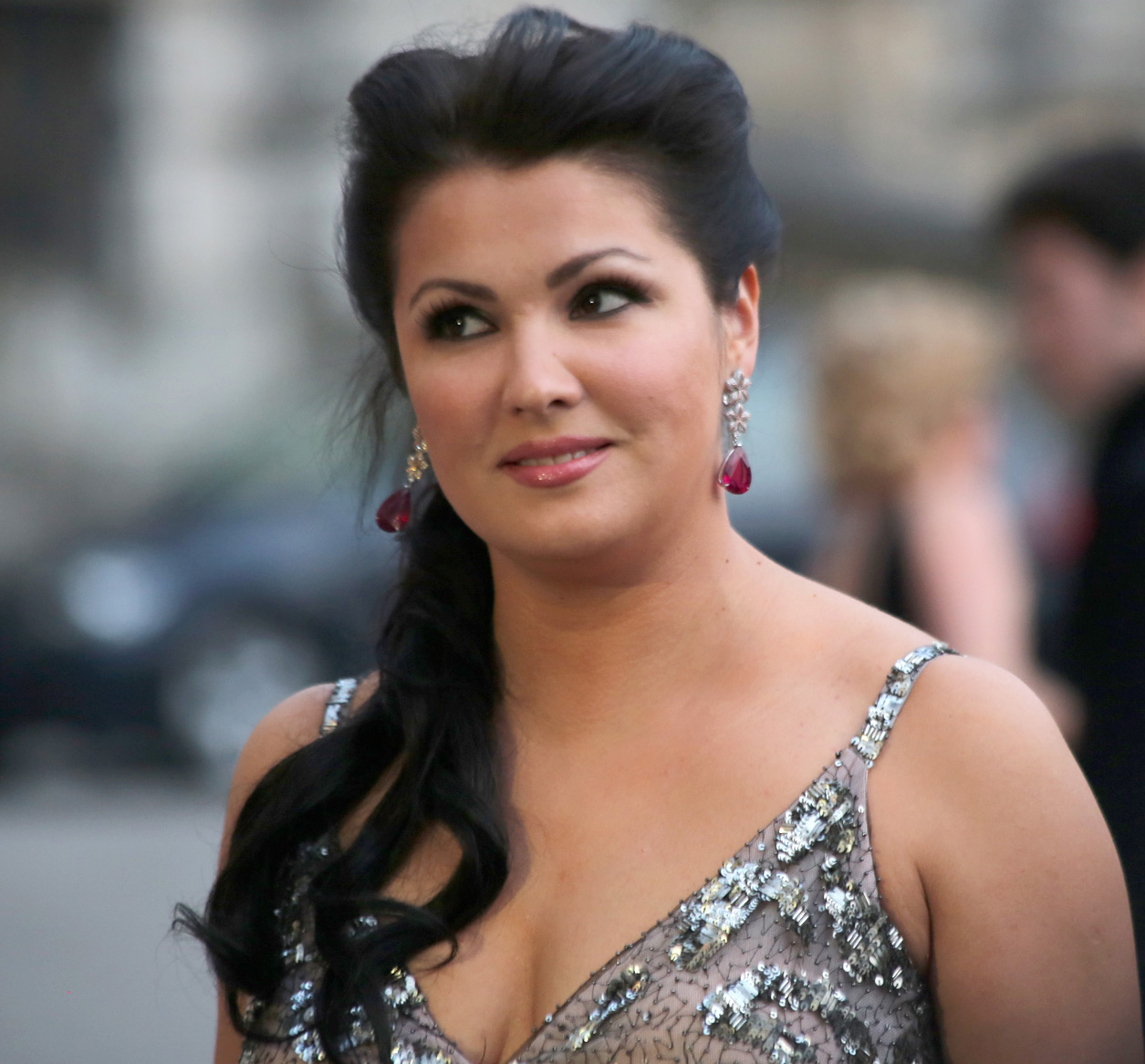
Operatic singer Anna Netrebko

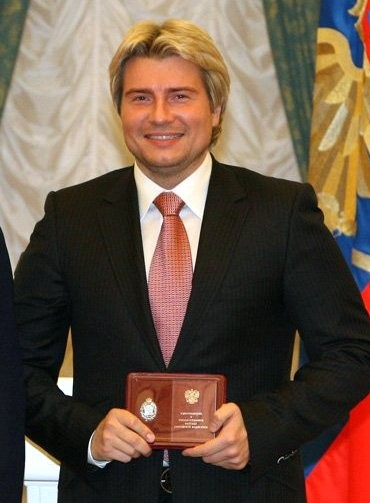
Singer Nikolay Baskov

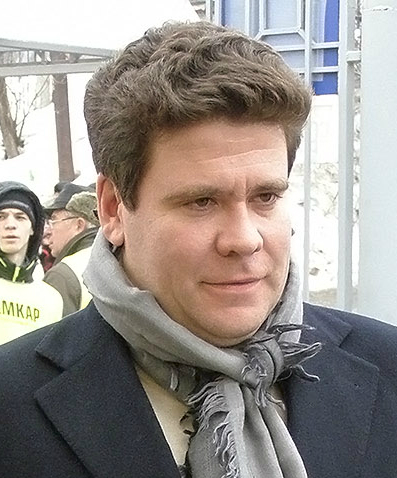
Classical pianist Denis Matsuev

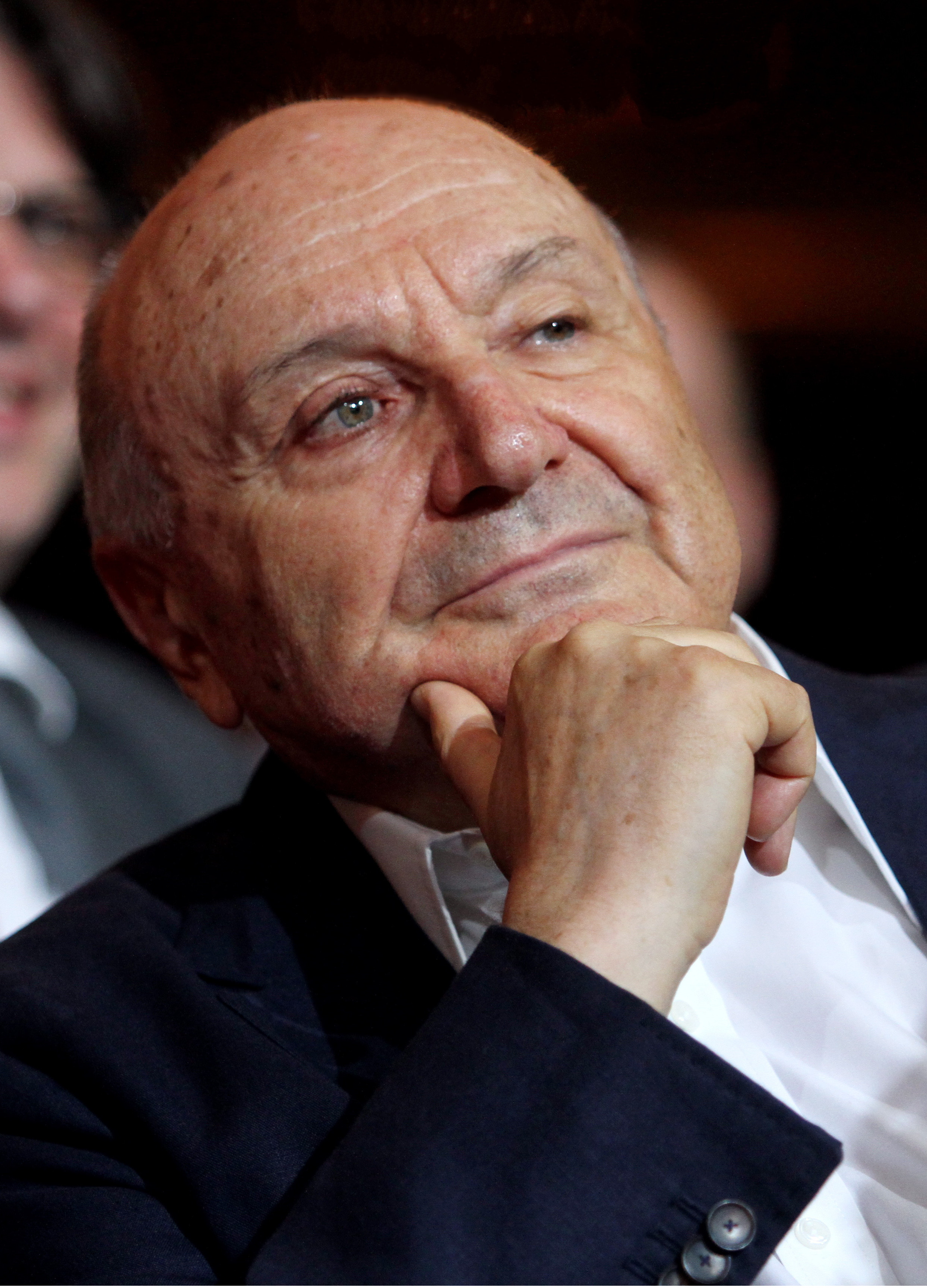
Writer, satirist Mikhail Zhvanetsky

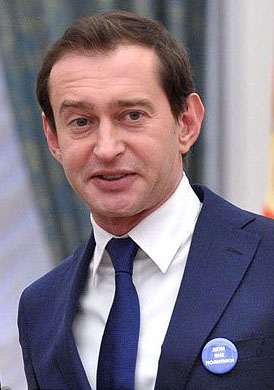
Actor Konstantin Khabensky

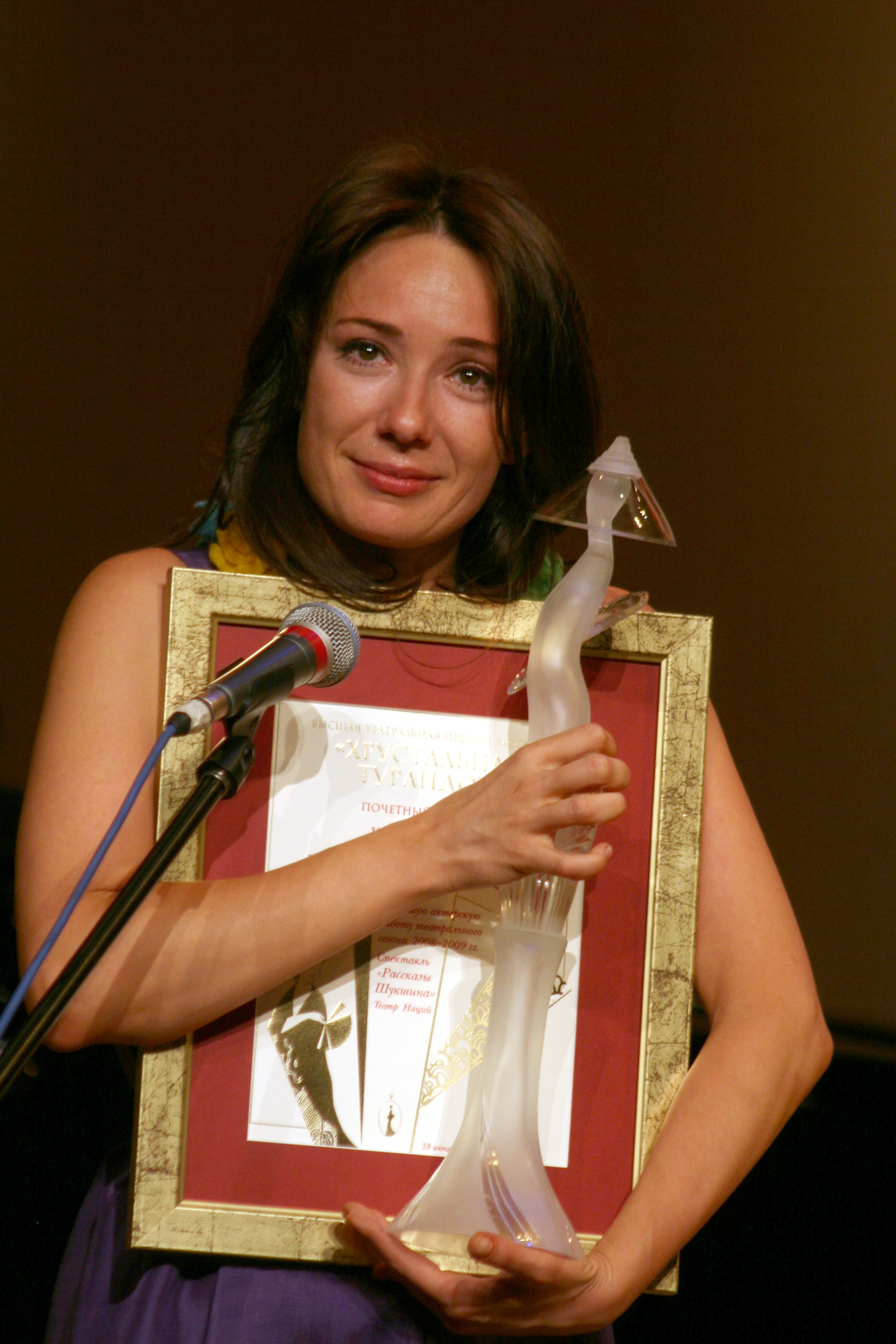
Actress Chulpan Khamatova

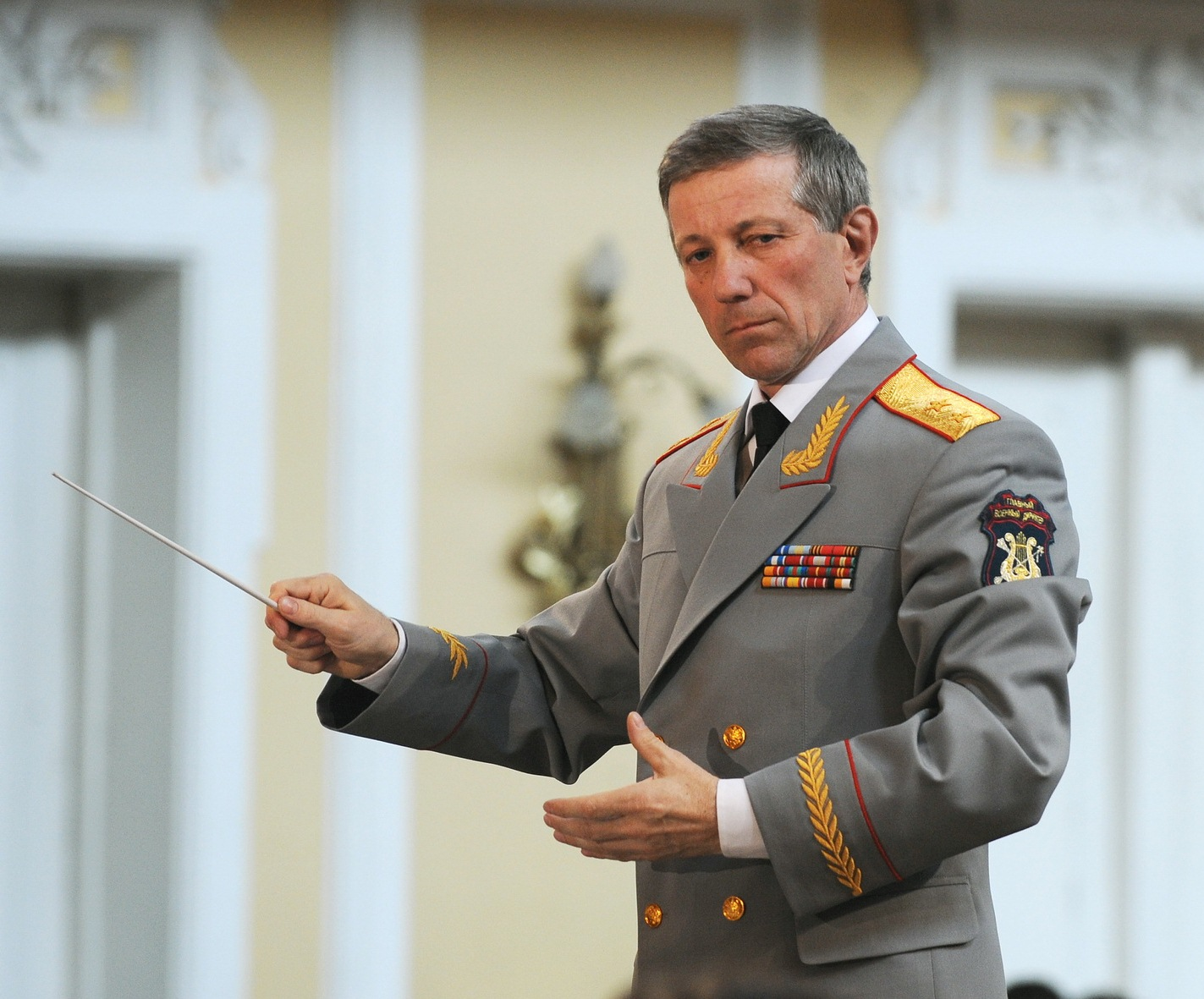
Conductor Valery Khalilov

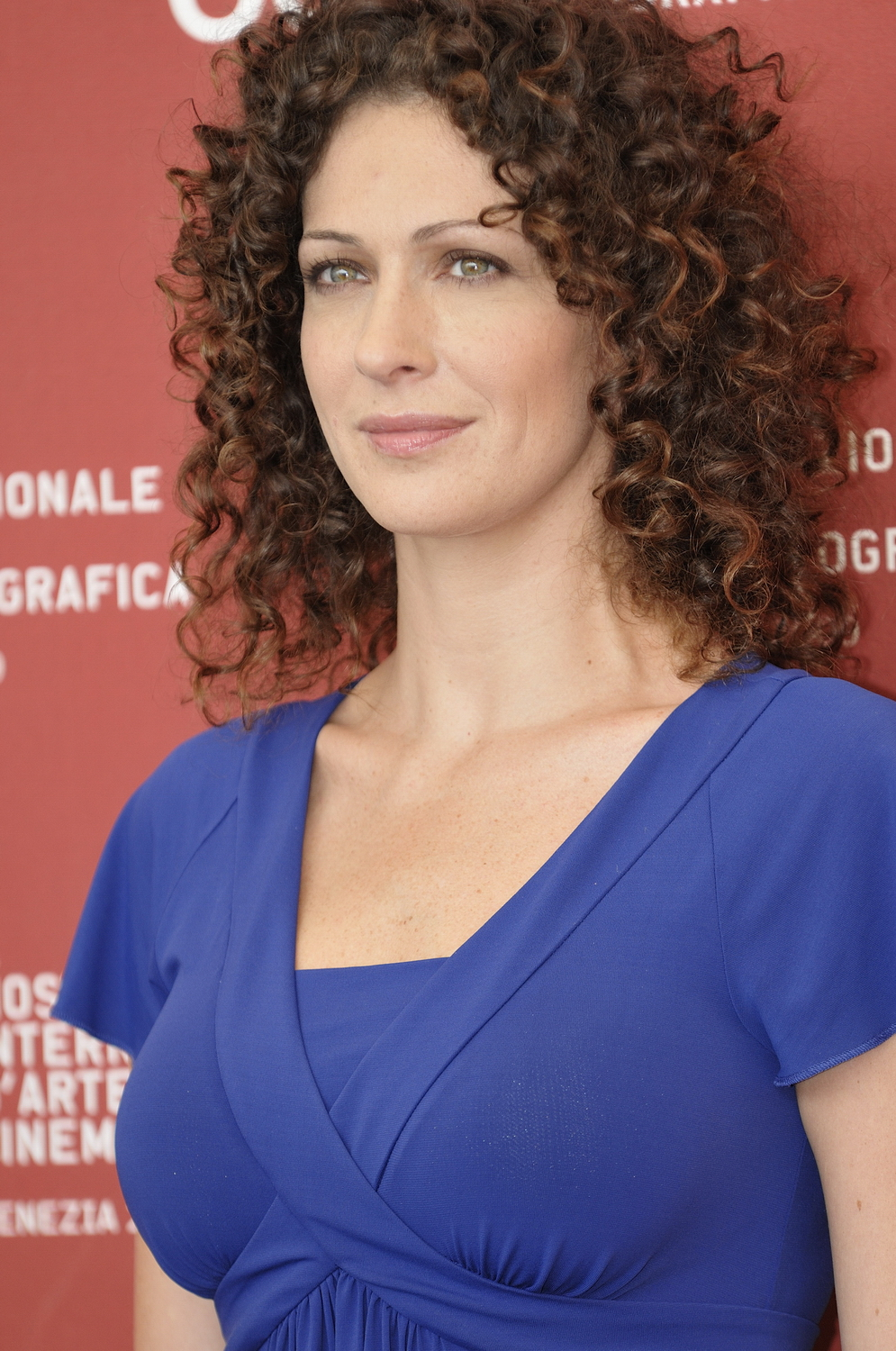
Actress Kseniya Rappoport

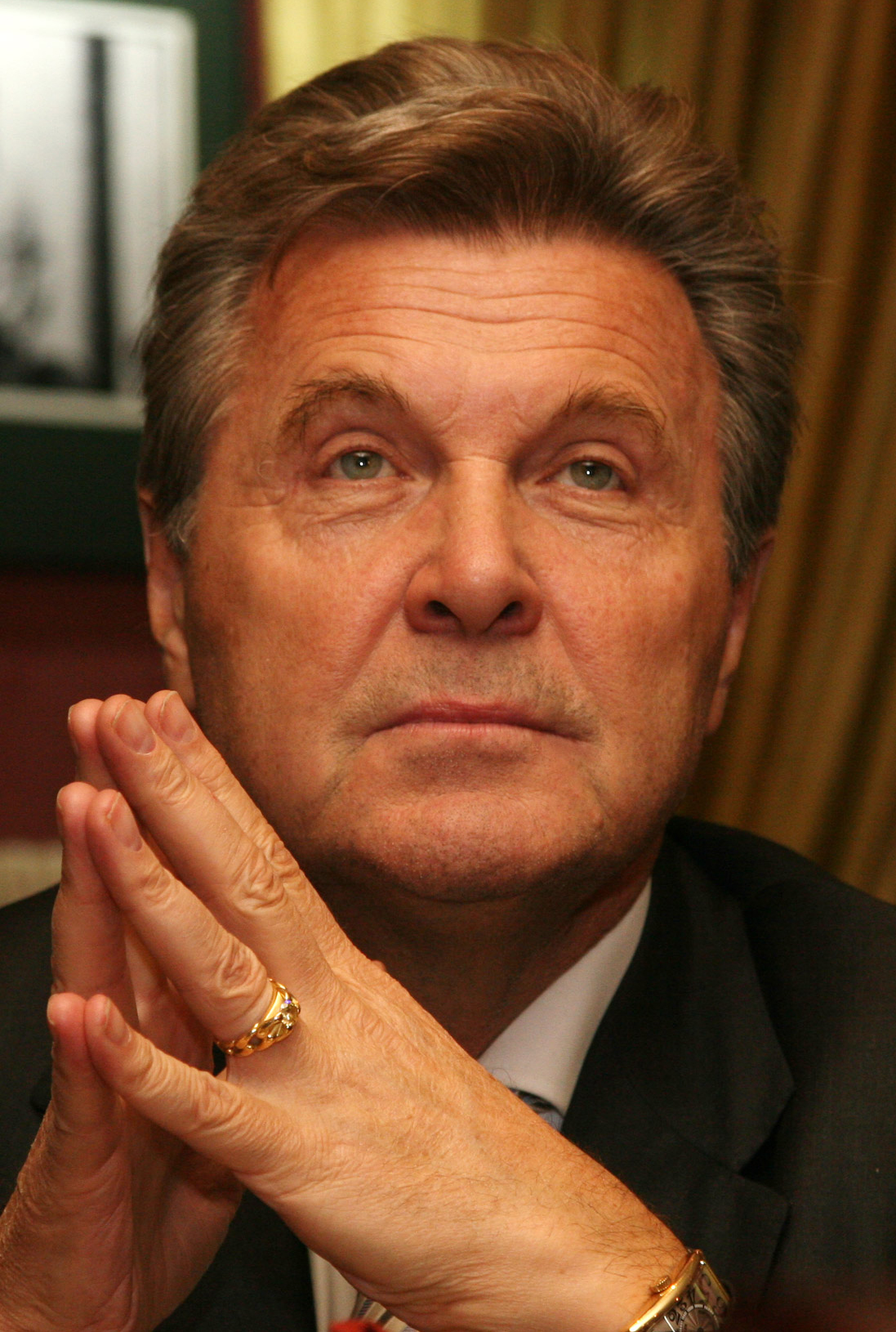
Singer Lev Leshchenko

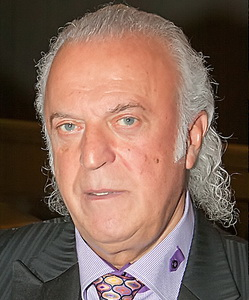
Poet Ilya Reznik

== People's Artist of the Russian Federation (list) ==
=== 1992 ===
February 21, 1992

- Ivan Krasko (1930–2025) — actor

April 6, 1992

- Boris Diev (1924–2008) — composer

May 8, 1992

- Lyudmila Fedotova (1939–2004), actress and singer
- Vladimir Bylkov (1938–2004) — theater director

June 10,1992

- Gennady Frolov (1937–2019) — actor
- Tamara Krasnyuk-Yablokova (1939–2008) — actress
- Tatyana Samoylova (1934–2014) – actress

June 23, 1992

- Tamara Nosova (1927–2007) — actress
- Harry Grodberg (1929–2016) — organist
- Yaroslav Baryshev (1942–2013) — actor

June 24,1992

- Pavel Rudakov (1915–1993), concertina player
- Gelena Velikanova (1923–2008) — singer

June 25,1992

- Izabella Yurieva (1899–2000) — singer
- Tatyana Vasilyeva (b.1947) — actress

August 25,1992

- Vera Alentova (b.1942) — actress

August 26,1992

- Vadim Abdrashitov (1945–2023) — film director
- Anatoly Solodilin (1937—2006) — theater actor

August 27,1992

- Svetlana Bragarnik (1944–2023) — theater & films actress

August 31,1992

- Fasil Akhmetov (1935–1998) — Tatar composer
- Vyacheslav Mochalov (1938–2010) — choirmaster

September 21,1992

- Irina Nekrasova (b.1938) — Gypsy actress

September 28,1992

- Yuri Lyubimov (1917–2014) — actor

October 13,1992

- Viktor Smirnov (1945–2017) — actor
- Albina Zotova (b.1939) — circus performer, equestrian, illusionist

November 20,1992

- Gennady Bortnikov (1939–2007) — actor
- Margarita Kypriyanova (1924–2005) — theater actress
- Liya Radina (1921–2000) — theater actress
- Vladimir Chermyaninov(1929–2009) — theater actress

December 8,1992

- Raisa Ibragimova (1951–2012) — tamer
- Grant Ibragimov (b.1951) — tamer
- Rustam Kaseev (1929–1997) — tamer
- Nikolay Pavlenko (b.1943) — tamer
- Vladimir Petrunin (b.1948) — ballet dancer
- Konstantin Raikin (b.1950) — actor

December 31,1992

- Zhanna Polovtseva — soloist of the choir
- Pavel Lebeshev (1940–2003) —cinematographer
- Aleksandr Knyazhevskiy (1936–1996) — cinematographer
- Nikolay Ivanov (1943–2020) – actor

=== 1993 ===
January 15,1993

- Vadim Zhukov (1934–2021) — director of the puppet theater
- Aleksandr Lomonosov (b.1939) — opera singer

February 2,1993

- Orzeta Bekuzarova (1934–2007) — Ossetian theater actress
- Yuri Gorobets (1932–2022) — actor

February 20,1993

- Leonarda Brushtain (1935–1999) — violinist

March 2,1993

- Mikhail Kopelman (b.1947) — violinist

March 18,1993

- Lyalya Bobrova (1939–2021) — Gypsy actress

April 23,1993

- Gennady Piskunov (1939–2020) — opera singer
- Olga Volkova (b.1939) — actress

May 7,1993

- Tahir Mateulin (1935–2005) — actor

May 13,1993

- Pyotr Fomenko (1932–2012) — director
- Yevgeny Steblov (b.1945) — actor
- Emilia Tsallagova (b.1947) — opera singer (soprano)
- Leonid Heifets (1934–2022) — theater director
- Leonid Psenichnyi (b.1944) — soloist of the song and dance ensemble
- Anatoly Lubimov (b.1941) — oboist
- Ludmila Kravtsova (1947–2010) — theater actress
- Valentina Zavorotnyk (b.1943) — theater actress

May 22,1993

- Irina Zhurina (b.1946) – opera singer
- Boris Khimichev (1933–2014) – actor

June 1,1993

- Valentina Tokarskaya (1906–1996) — actress

June 16,1993

- Ivan Stepanov (b.1945) — opera singer
- Semyon Okoshnikov (1944–2019) — opera singer

Jule 3,1993

- Georgy Garanian (1934–2010) — musician

Jule 14,1993

- Pavel Slobodkin (1945–2017) — composer

Jule 27,1993

- Viktor Ivanov (b.1941) — military conductor, colonel
- Mirian Dzhangisherashvili (1943–2018) — theater director

August 20,1993

- Vladimir Kydryashov (1939–2006) — opera singer
- Vladimir Tonha (b.1941) — violinist

October 26,1993

- Raisa Dement (b.1941) — Gypsy actress
- Lev Dodin (b.1944) — theatre director

October 28,1993

- Mikhail Matveev (1937–2000) — actor
- Yuri Evtushenko (b.1943) — guslar

November 23,1993

- Ruzhena Sikora (1916–2006) — singer

November 30,1993

- Iosif Mataev (1940–2018) — choreographer
- Vasiliy Shtefutsa (b.1936) — singer

December 16,1993

- Andrey Abramenkov (1935–2023) — fiddler
- Sergei Solovyov (1944–2021) — director
- Gugren Tonunst (1922–1997) — actor
- Olga Ostroumova (b.1947) — actress

December 18,1993

- Gleb Lapiado (1926–2007) — jockey
- Galina Petrinskaya (1935–2000) — aerialist

December 20,1993

- Evgeny Knyazev (b.1942) — theater actor
- Valentina Morozova (b.1953) — ballet dancer
- Leonid Nikolaev (1940–2009) — conductor
- Tatyana Sterling (b.1942) — opera singer
- Vitaliy Tihonov (b.1938) — acrobat
- Tatyana Bochtaryova (b.1953) — soloist of the Cossack choir

=== 1994 ===
January 6, 1994

- Pavel Ovsyannikov (b.1951) —military conductor
- Oleg Baglukov (b.1940) — theater actor
- Vladimir Knestikov (1950–1999) — theater actor
- Aleksander Sklyarov (1949–2023) — accordion player

January 11, 1994

- Andrey Kozhevnikov (1933–2011) — conductor
- Igor Voronov (b.1953) — soloist of the male vocal quartet
- Valeriy Volhovskiy (1938–2003) — director of the puppet theater
- Yuliya Abakumovskaya (b.1942) — opera singer
- Semyon Aranovich (1934–1996) — director of photography
- Aleksey German (1938–2013) —director of photography
- Ernst Romanov (1936–2024) — actor

February 9, 1994

- Valentin Feigin (1934–1995) — cellist
- Vladimir Matveev (1939–2017) — actor
- Boris Kiselyov (1943–2016) —theater actor
- Valentina Iltsaranova (1939–2010) — Kalmyk singer
- Georgy Butuhanov (b.1932) — theater actor

February 12, 1994

- Valeriy Ivchenko (1939–2024) — actor
- Nina Usatova (b.1951) — actress
- Temur Chkheidze (1943–2022) — theater director

March 1, 1994

- Nikolai Yeremenko Jr. (1949–2001) — actor
- Andrey Martynov (b.1945) — actor
- Valery Nosik (1940–1995) — actor
- Irina Muravyova (b.1949) — actress

March 14, 1994

- Eduard Bernadskiy (1942–2014) — circus performer
- Aleksandr Popov (b.1940) — circus performer
- Maria Bulova (b.1956) — ballet dancer
- Tatyana Erastova (b.1947) — opera singer

March 21, 1994

- Eduard Markin (b.1941) — choirmaster

April 11, 1994

- Mikhail Sales (b.1946) — theater director & actor
- Yuriy Novohizhin (b.1942) — Theater actor
- Ivan Permyakov (b.1944) — soloist of the folk choir
- Vera Chaika (b.1947) — opera singer
- Albert Tarakanov (b.1938) — pianist
- Nikolay Kuchev (1927–2002) — actor
- Elena Mishina (b.1941) — actress of the puppet theater
- Vladimir Lubyshkin (b.1946) — soloist of the folk choir
- Gennadi Yukhtin (1932–2022) — actor
- Georgy Natanson (1921–2017) — director
- Yevgeni Gerasimov (b.1951) — actor
- Pavel Kogan (b.1952) — conductor

May 6, 1994

- Anatoly Sobolev (1939–2012) — conductor

May 26, 1994

- Raisa Goncharova (b.1954) — soloist of Cossaks choir
- Anatoly Lizvinskiy (1947–2008) — soloist of Cossaks choir
- Boris Shcherbakov (b.1949) — actor

June 3, 1994

- Anatoly Ivanov (1941–2009) — theater director
- Alexander Galkovsky (1945–2016) — violist
- Aleksander Korchagin (1945–2022) — violist
- Sergey Pishugin (b.1941) — violist
- Andrey Shishlov (1945–2016) — violist

June 28, 1994

- Olga Antonova (b.1937)

July 6, 1994

- Igor Gavrish (b.1945) — violist
- Natalia Gerasimova (b.1950) — soloist of choir
- Leonid Nevedomsky (1939–2018) — actor
- Anatoly Pustokhin (b.1938) — actor
- Lidiya Yatsunuch (b.1950) — opera singer
- Natalya Tenyakova (b.1944) — actress
- Sergey Baikov — opera singer
- Aleksander Vetrov (b.1961) — ballet dancer
- Alla Vasilyeva (1933–2018) — violist

August 29, 1994

- Albert Filozov (1937–2016) — actor
- Boris Novikov (1925–1997) — actor
- Mikhail Ivanov (1929–1995) — circus performer
- Oleksandr Bondurianskyi (b.1945) — pianist
- Vladimir Ivanov (b.1948) — violist
- Mikhail Utkin (b.1952) — violist
- Aleksei Zharkov (1948–2016) — actor

September 12, 1994

- Kapitolina Lazarenko (1925–2007)

December 1, 1994

- Valentina Baranova (b.1951) — opera singer
- Iya Bobrakova (1927–2012) — theater actress
- Vladislav Verestnikov (b.1947) — opera singer
- Vadim Derbenyov (1934—2016) — director
- Tatyana Klanidchkina (b.1956) — ballet dancer
- Faina Kostina (b.1939) — actress of puppets theater
- Ivan Krivoruchko (b.1940) — actor
- Yevgeny Krylatov (1934–2019) — composer
- Aleksander Kuimov (1958–2021) — ballet dancer
- Asiyat Kumratova (b.1940) — soloist of choir
- Nadezhda Kuular (b.1947) — singer
- Friedrich Lips (b.1948) — accordionist
- Rimma Markova (1925–2015) — actress
- Emilia Moskvitina (b.1939) —harpist
- Viktor Pliner (1915–1999) — circus performer
- Igor Shibanov (1944–2019) — actor
- Stepan Denisov (b.1941) — tiger and bear trainer
- Elvina Podchernikova-Elvorti (1928–2014) — circus performer

December 29, 1994

- Liya Akhedzhakova (b.1938) — actress
- Yevgeny Bilyauar (b.1947) — circus performer
- Anatoly Vasilyev (b.1946) — actor
- Adam Visitaev (b.1948) — circus performer
- Edison Denisov (1929–1996) — composer
- Yuriy Loevskiy (b.1939) — violist
- Viktor Pavlov (1940–2006) — actor
- Lyubov Polishchuk (1949–2006) — actress
- Aleksandr Porokhovshchikov (1939–2012) — actor, director
- Mikhail Rozhkov (1918–2018) — balalaika player
- Aleksey Sarach (b.1943) — circus performer

=== 1995 ===
January 27,1995

- Yuri Avsharov (1937–2010) — actor
- Boris Arzhanov (1942–2021) — actor
- Zinire Atnabaeva (1934–2013) — theater actress
- Irina Bochkova (1938–2020) — violist
- Vladimir Bychkov (1928–2024) — ballet dancer
- Boris Vetrov (b.1943) — Theater actress
- Vladimir Vlasenko (b.1932) — singer and bassoonist
- Rustem Gabdullin (b.1944) — contrabass player
- Pyotr Karpov (1947–2020) — the operetta artist
- Vyacheslav Kruglov (b.1945) — performer on domra and mandolin
- Roman Ledenev (1930–2019) — composer
- Galina Midzyaeva (b.1941) — theater actress
- Natalya Pankova (b.1951) — pianist
- Vladimir Rubin (1924–2019) — composer
- Nikolay Simachev (1927–1996) — ballet dancer
- Leonid Solovyov (1940–2010) — theater actor
- Larisa Cycheva (b.1954) — ballet dancer
- Nina Terentieva (b.1946) — opera singer
- Ekaterina Shavrina (b.1942) — folk-singer
- Anatoly Bazhalkin (b.1949) — Lieutenant Colonel

March 17,1995

- Nina Ananiashvili (b.1963) —ballet dancer
- Grigoriy Getsov (1918–2000) — theater actor
- Galina Zaitseva (b.1947) — opera singer
- Aleksandr Mezentsev (1951–2005) — actor
- Nikolai Prokopovich (1925–2005) — actor
- Nina Sharova-Zaspanova (1918–2006) — actress
- Mikhail Yanko (b.1950) — actor

April 25,1995

- Vladimir Verbitsky (b.1943) — conductor
- Rimma Volkova (1940–2021) — opera singer
- Mikhail Elbonov (1945–2023) — Buryat actor
- Gennady Zavolikin (1948–2001) — accordionist
- Vladislav Novik (b.1951) — choirmeister
- Aleksandr Proshkin (b.1940) — director
- Tatyana Shestakova (b.1948) — ballet dancer

May 11,1995

- Gennady Rozhdestvov (1934–2005) — ballet dancer

May 30,1995

- Rubina Kalantaryan (1925–2024) — opera singer
- Elena Kamburova (b.1940) — singer
- Vyacheslav Pomelnikov (b.1947) — accordion player
- Nikolay Peregudov (1930–2009) —concertmaster

August 4,1995

- Vladimir Barlyaev (1947–2008) — theater and dubbing actor, singer
- Vasiliy Bochkaryov (b.1942) — actor
- Pyotr Vorobyov (b.1942) — theater actor
- Ivan Mozgovenko (1924–2021) — clarinetist
- Nikolay Mozgovenko (b.1947) — clarinetist
- Yuriy Osherov (1942–2019) — актёр
- Nikolay Shishkov (b.1946) — actor

August 5,1995

- Venera Ganeeva (b.1955) — opera singer (coloratura soprano)
- Georgy Ivanov (1927–2010) — composer
- Ivetta Kiselyova (1927–2006) — actress
- Zelimhan Kozaev (b.1951) — the head of the dance ensemble
- Lev Lyubetskiy (1920–2000) — actor
- Nikolay Makeev (1920–1998) — actor
- Liliya Sabitova (b.1953) — ballet dancer
- Zilya Singatullina (b.1949) — opera singer (lyrico-coloratura soprano)
- Boris Tevlin (1931–2012) — choral conductor
- Dmitri Hvorostovsky (1962–2017) — opera singer, (baritone)

August 11,1995

- Yevgeny Akulov (1905–1996) — conductor

August 17,1995

- Vladimir Nesterov (b.1931) — soloist of the song and dance ensemble of the Northern Fleet

October 19,1995

- Oleg Boshnyakovich (1920–2006) — pianist
- Yevgeniya Glushenko (b.1952) — actress
- Mairbek Ikaev (1927–2004) — theater actress
- Igor Kostolevsky (born 1948) — actor
- Alina Kuznetsova (1938–2024) — theater actress
- Savva Kulish (1936–2001) — director
- Vyacheslav Semyonov (b. 1946) — accordionist
- Evgeny Tashkov (1926–2012) — film director, screenwriter and actor
- Lyubov Timofeeva (b.1951) — pianist
- Boris Figotin (1923–1998) — composer

November 27,1995

- Yuriy Bure-Nebelsen (b. 1938) — theater director
- Rafael Klainer (1939–2024) — artist-reader, theater director
- Antonina Kuznetsova (b. 1941) — theater actress
- Irena Tarasova (b. 1938) — actress
- Lyubov Kuzmicheva (1937–2014) — soloist of choir, singer
- Aleftina Lapteva — singer, soloist of choir
- Galina Rozhdestvenskaya (1925–2001) — conductor, choirmeister

December 28,1995

- Anatoly Aleksandrovich (1922–2016) — singer
- Galina Bibicheva (b. 1948) — opera singer (mezzo-soprano)
- Vladimir Burulev (1945–2015) — opera singer (baritone)
- Vladimir Vasilyov (1931–2017) — choreographer, ballet director
- Nabi Ibragimov (1935–2022) — film & theater actor
- Lev Kuznetsov (1944–2008) — opera singer (tenor)
- Lima Kustabaeva (b. 1945) — artistic director of the State Song and Dance Ensemble of the Republic of Tatarstan.
- Avangard Leontiev (b. 1947) — theater & film actor
- Grigory Pinyasov (b. 1948) — singer
- Yevgeniya Simonova (b. 1955) — actress
- Leonid Filatov (1946–2003) — theater and film actor, film director, poet, playwright
- Gennady Pasko – painter

=== 1996 ===
January 29,1996

- Dolores-Luiza Belaonova (1937_2009) — opera singer (lyric-dramatic soprano)
- Vyacheslav Dobrynin (b. 1946) — composer & singer
- Lyudmila Korshunova (b. 1950) — theater actress
- Igor Krutoy (b. 1954) — composer
- Avangard Fedotov (1925–2015) — clarinetist
- Valery Fokin (b. 1946) — theatrical and film director
- Tamara Chernyshova (1922–2007) — theatrical actress
- Isaac Schwartz (1923–2009) — composer

February 21,1996

- Alexander Burdonsky (1941–2017) — theater director
- Sergey Nazarko (b. 1951) — conductor of the Song and Dance Ensemble of the Moscow Air Defense District, lieutenant-colonel
- Pavel Mikhailov (b. 1943) — singer

March 9,1996

- Vladimir Boikov (1935–2009) — conductor
- Yuriy Drozhnyak (b. 1943) — theater actor
- Sergey Zakharov (1950–2019) — singer
- Vladimir Kelin (1936–2013) — opera singer (tenor)
- Valeriy Kovtun (1942–2017) — accordionist
- Aleksey Levitskiy (1931–2008) — opera singer (bass)
- Valery Leontiev (b. 1949), singer
- Boris Temirkanov (1937–2018), conductor

April 9,1995

- Anatoly Adoskin (1927–2019), actor
- Nina Vasilyeva (b. 1945), actress of the operetta theater
- Konstantin Vasilyev (1933–2020), clown and acrobat
- Anatoly Vekshin (1930–2016), clown
- Galina Dyomina (1925–2005) — actress
- Elena Zimenkova (b. 1944) — singer
- Leonid Zimnenko (1943–2021), opera singer
- Hodache Molodtsova (b. 1949), folk-singer
- Valery Polyansky (b. 1949), conductor

May 2,1996

- Konstantin Biragov (1936–1999), actor
- Vyacheslav Vershinin (b. 1942), theatrical actor
- Maidari Zhaphandaev (1946–2008), actor
- Natalya Seleznyova (b.1945), actress
- Aleksander Usov (1937–1998), theatrical actor
- Mikhail Philippov (b.1947), actor
- Marta Tsifrinovich (1924–2009), puppeteer

June 7,1996

- Aleksandr Azarin (1919–2004), master of artistic reading
- Svetlana Bezrodnaya (b. 1934), violinist
- Nadezhda Gracheva (b. 1969), ballet dancer
- Galina Stepanenko (b. 1966), ballet dancer
- Naum Shtarkman (1927–2006), pianist
- Vladimir Yakovlev (1930–2008), actor

June 13,1996

- Ninel Konstantinova (1926–2010), theatrical actress
- Natalya Novakova (b. 1947), theater actress
- Olga Ovchinikova (b. 1950), theater actress
- Vladislav Agafonnikov (b. 1936), composer
- Georgy Demurov (1940–2023), theater actor
- Lidiya Anikeeva (1950–2024), actress
- Mikhail Svetin (1929–2015), actor
- Evgeniya Pchyolkina (1928–1997), theater actress
- Leonard Varfolomeev (1936–2010), actor

June 20,1996

- Valery Gergiev (b.1953), conductor

August 30,1996

- Nikolai Burlyayev – actor
- Vyacheslav Dobrynin – composer, singer
- Valery Fokin – theatre director
- Igor Krutoy – composer
- Valery Leontiev – singer
- Tamara Miansarova – singer
- Yuriy Norshteyn – director
- Nikolay Serebryakov – director
- Margarita Terekhova – actress
- Sergei Zakharov – singer

=== 1997 ===
- Yuri Antonov – musician
- Victor Balashov – radio host
- Valery Lantratov- ballet dancer
- Alexander Lenkov – actor
- Alexander Malinin – musician
- Vladimir Matorin – singer
- Klara Novikova – actress
- Kirill Tikhonov – conductor

=== 1998 ===
- Olga Barnet – actress
- Vitali Konyayev – actor
- Fuat Mansurov – conductor
- Sergey Migitsko – actor
- Yuri Nikolaev – TV and radio host, actor
- Maria Pakhomenko – singer
- Boris Plotnikov – actor
- Gennadi Poloka – actor, director
- Nina Ruslanova – actress
- Sergei Skripka – conductor
- Larisa Udovichenko – actress
- Emmanuil Vitorgan – actor
- Sergei Makovetsky – actor

=== 1999 ===
- Alla Bayanova – singer
- Andrei Chistyakov – conductor
- Valentin Dikul – circus performer
- Vladimir Ilyin – actor
- Alexander Gradsky – musician
- David Goloschekin – musician
- Nadezhda Kadysheva – singer
- Mikhail Kononov – actor
- Aristarkh Livanov – actor
- Lyudmila Polyakova – actress
- Andrey Makarevich – musician
- Tatyana Piletskaya – actress
- Joseph Raihelgauz – theatre director
- Alexey Rybnikov – composer
- Alexey Sheynin – actor
- Nikolai Sorokin – actor
- Eduard Artemyev - composer

=== 2000 ===
- Ivan Bortnik – actor
- Tatyana Dogileva – actress
- Taisia Kornilova — circus performer
- Evgeny Brazhnik – conductor
- Aleksandr Misharin (screenwriter)
- Dmitry Nazarov – actor
- Emilyano Ochagaviya – actor
- Yuri Sarantsev – actor
- Alla Surikova – director
- Svetlana Morgunova – dictor

=== 2001 ===
- Lev Borisov – actor
- Zakhar Bron – violinist
- Boris Bystrov – actor
- Lydia Davydova – singer
- Sergei Filin – ballet dancer
- Oleg Gazmanov – singer
- Boris Khmelnitsky – actor
- Georgi Movsesyan – composer
- Ilya Oleynikov – actor
- Yuriy Stoyanov – actor
- Slava Polunin – circus performer, actor
- Alexander Rosenbaum – musician
- Vladimir Steklov – actor
- Nikolay Tsiskaridze – ballet dancer
- Alexandra Zakharova – actress

=== 2002 ===
- Olga Borodina – singer
- Gennady Gladkov – composer
- Boris Klyuyev – actor
- Tatyana Kravchenko – actress
- Vladimir Ponkin – conductor
- Stahan Rakhimov – singer
- Nikolay Rastorguyev – singer
- Karen Shakhnazarov – filmmaker
- Elena Yakovleva – actress
- Leonid Yakubovich – actor
- Alla Yoshpe – singer
- Ludmila Senchina – singer

=== 2003 ===
- Kama Ginkas – theatre director
- Igor Kashintsev – actor
- Andrey Kovalchuk – sculptor
- Oleg Menshikov – actor
- Leonid Nechayev – director
- Viktor Rakov – actor
- Ilya Reznik – poet
- Andrei Smirnov – actor, director
- Zinovy Vysokovsky – actor
- Aleksandr Zatsepin – composer
- Mikhail Tanich – poet

=== 2004 ===
- Oleg Anofriyev – actor, musician
- Igor Yuryevich Ivanov – actor
- Zinaida Ignatyeva – pianist
- Tamara Gverdtsiteli – singer
- Yevgeny Mironov – actor
- Alexander Mitta – director
- Alexander Morozov – composer
- Vladimir Nazarov – musician
- Andrey Smolyakov – actor
- Alexander Sokurov – director
- Maurice Yaklashkin – conductor
- Valeriya Zaklunna – actress

=== 2005 ===
- Sergei Artsibashev – director
- Yuriy Nazarov – actor
- Vladimir Ovchinnikov - pianist
- Sergei Roldugin – cellist
- Boris Romanov – actor
- Raisa Ryazanova – actress
- Valentin Smirnitsky – actor
- Svetlana Smirnova – actress
- Valentin Yudashkin – fashion designer
- Era Ziganshina – actress

=== 2006 ===
- Svyatoslav Belza – critic
- Yuri Bosco – artist
- Aleksandr Galibin – actor
- Sergei Garmash – actor
- Vitaly Logvinovsky – actor
- Ulyana Lopatkina – ballet dancer
- Alexander Pyatkov – actor
- Angelina Vovk – actress
- Slava Zaitsev – fashion designer
- Marina Zudina – actress

=== 2007 ===
- Irina Alfyorova – actress
- Aleksandr Domogarov – actor
- Margarita Fyodorova – pianist
- Vladimir Galouzine – singer
- Aleksei Guskov – actor
- Dmitry Kharatyan – actor
- Irina Rozanova – actress
- Diana Vishneva – ballet dancer
- Konstantin Lopushansky – director

=== 2008 ===
- Sergey Bezrukov – actor
- Yuri Chernov – actor
- Philipp Kirkorov – singer
- Yulia Makhalina – ballet dancer
- Anna Netrebko – singer
- Svetlana Zakharova – prima-ballerina

=== 2009 ===
- Maria Alexandrova – ballet dancer
- Nikolay Baskov – singer
- Alexey Buldakov – actor
- Oleg Mityaev – musician
- Anatoly Mukasei – cinematographer
- Valentina Telichkina – actress
- Roman Viktyuk – actor, director

=== 2010s ===
==== 2010 ====
- Irina Allegrova – singer
- Vladimir Khotinenko – actor, director
- Dmitry Malikov – musician
- Vladimir Mashkov – actor
- Aleksei Serebryakov – actor
- Vyacheslav Spesivtsev – actor
- Alexander Buinov – singer

==== 2011 ====
- Igor Butman – saxophonist
- Fyodor Dobronravov – actor
- Vera Glagoleva – actress and film director
- Andrei Khrzhanovsky – film director
- Denis Matsuev – pianist
- Lev Matyushin - sculptor
- Boris Nevzorov – actor, director
- Irma Nioradze – ballet dancer

==== 2012 ====
- Dmitry Gudanov – ballet dancer
- Konstantin Khabensky – actor
- Chulpan Khamatova – actress
- Bedros Kirkorov – singer
- Hibla Gerzmava – opera singer
- Mariya Aronova – actress

==== 2013 ====
- Nikolai Chindyajkin – actor
- Nikolai Lugansky – pianist
- Natalya Gvozdikova – actress
- Lev Prygunov – actor
- Igor Sklyar – actor
- Aleksandr Trofimov – actor
- Valeriya – singer

==== 2014 ====
- Valery Khalilov – conductor, composer
- Anna Odintsova - ballet dancer

==== 2015 ====
- Arkady Arkanov – actor (posthumous)
- Kseniya Rappoport – actress

==== 2016 ====
- Vladimir Nosik – actor
- Yuliya Rutberg – actress
- Alexander Sladkovsky – conductor
- Igor Vernik – actor

==== 2017 ====
- Olga Pogodina – actress

==== 2018 ====
- Viktoria Tereshkina – ballet dancer
- Nikolai Lebedev - actor
- Yekaterina Shipulina - principal dancer

==== 2019 ====
- Mikhail Porechenkov - actor
- Angelina Vovk - presenter
- Igor Nikolayev - composer, singer

==== 2020 ====
- Anna Kovalchuk - actress
- Felix Korobov - conductor
- Aleksei Kravchenko - actor
- Maria Mironova - actress

==== 2021 ====
- Andrey Ilyin - actor
- Galina Tyunina - actress
- Anita Tsoy - singer
- Natalia Vdovina - actress

==== 2022 ====
- Vladislav Vetrov - actor
- Elena Sanayeva - actress
- Alexander Kniazev - cellist, organist
- Vadim Repin - violinist
- Diana Gurtskaya - singer
- Stas Mikhaylov - singer
- Grigory Leps - singer
- Igor Matvienko - composer, producer

==== 2023 ====
- Valery Lednev - painter
- Vladimir Pozner - journalist

==== 2025 ====
- Irina Pegova — actress

==== 2025 ====
- Maksim Averin — actor
- Anna Mikhalkova — actress
- Alexander Oleshko — actor

== See also ==
- Awards and decorations of the Russian Federation
- Ministerial Awards of the Russian Federation
- List of awards of independent services of the Russian Federation
