= Lantratov =

Lantratov (masculine, Russian: Лантратов) or Lantratova (feminine, Russian: Лантратова) is a Russian surname. Notable people with the surname include:

- Darya Lantratova (born 1984), Russian politician
- Ilya Lantratov (born 1995), Russian soccer player
- Valery Lantratov (born 1958), Russian ballet dancer
- Vera Lantratova (1947–2021), Soviet volleyball player
- Vladislav Lantratov (born 1988), Russian principal dancer
- Yana Lantratova (born 1988), Russian politician
