= Alla Yoshpe =

Soviet singer (1937–2021)

Alla Yoshpe PAR
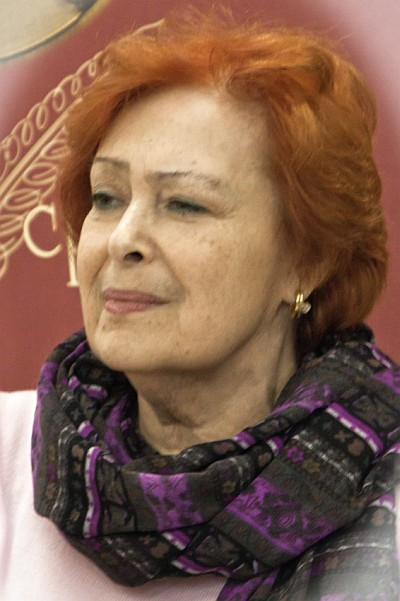
- Born: 13 June 1937; Moscow, USSR
- Died: 30 January 2021 (aged 83); Moscow, Russia

Alla Yakovlevna Ioshpe (Yoshpe) (Russian: А́лла Я́ковлевна Ио́шпе (Йо́шпе); 13 June 1937 – 30 January 2021) was a Soviet and Russian pop singer, and a People's Artist of the Russian Federation (2002).

== Biography ==
Yoshpe was born in Moscow into a Jewish family. She studied philosophy at Moscow State University and while a student sang with the university's symphony orchestra.

In 1960, at a university event, she met Stakhan Rakhimov and the pair formed a pop duo. The pair performed both in the Soviet Union and overseas.

== Selected songs ==
- 'Tri plus pyat' (Russian: Три плюс пять, lit. 'Three plus five'), Russian-language cover of Marie Laforêt's 'Ivan, Boris et moi'
