= Kirill Tikhonov =

Russian conductor

Kirill Tikhonov (1921–1998) was a Russian conductor and a recipient of the People's Artist of Russia award.

== Biography ==
Kirill Tikhonov graduated from Moscow Conservatory in 1947 and by 1952 was graduated from symphonic conducting department of the Saint Petersburg Conservatory as well. His first public appearance took place at the Moscow Theater of Drama in 1945 and later on he appeared at the Saint Petersburg Comedy Theatre and both Perm and Sverdlovsk Theatre of Opera and Ballet. In 1977 he became a lecturer at the Moscow State University of Culture and later became a professor there. By 1990 he was promoted to a chief conductor and then became musical director of Helikon Opera which he co-founded along with Dmitry Bertman and became his friend and helper till his death on 29 December 1998.

During his life he has toured throughout Russia and overseas conducting such operas as Mikhail Glinka's A Life for the Tsar, Alexander Borodin's Prince Igor, Modest Mussorgsky's Boris Godunov and Khovanshchina, and both The Queen of Spades and Eugene Onegin of Pyotr Ilyich Tchaikovsky, among others. Besides operas he also conducted ballet music as well, including Sergei Prokofiev's Cinderella, Peer Gynt and Rodion Shchedrin's The Humpbacked Horse. For Helikon Opera alone he has conducted over 23 operas including Giovanni Battista Pergolesi's La serva padrona, The Tsar's Bride of Nikolai Rimsky-Korsakov, Georges Bizet's Carmen, Prokofiev's Rotschield’s Violin and both La traviata and Aida of Giuseppe Verdi. Many future conductors such as Lev Lyakh, Wolf Gorelik, Eugene Kolobov, Valery Kritskov, Evgeny Brazhnik, Alexander Voloshchuk and Victoria Unguryanu among others did some practical work under his guidance.
