= Svetlana Bezrodnaya =

Russian conductor and music educator

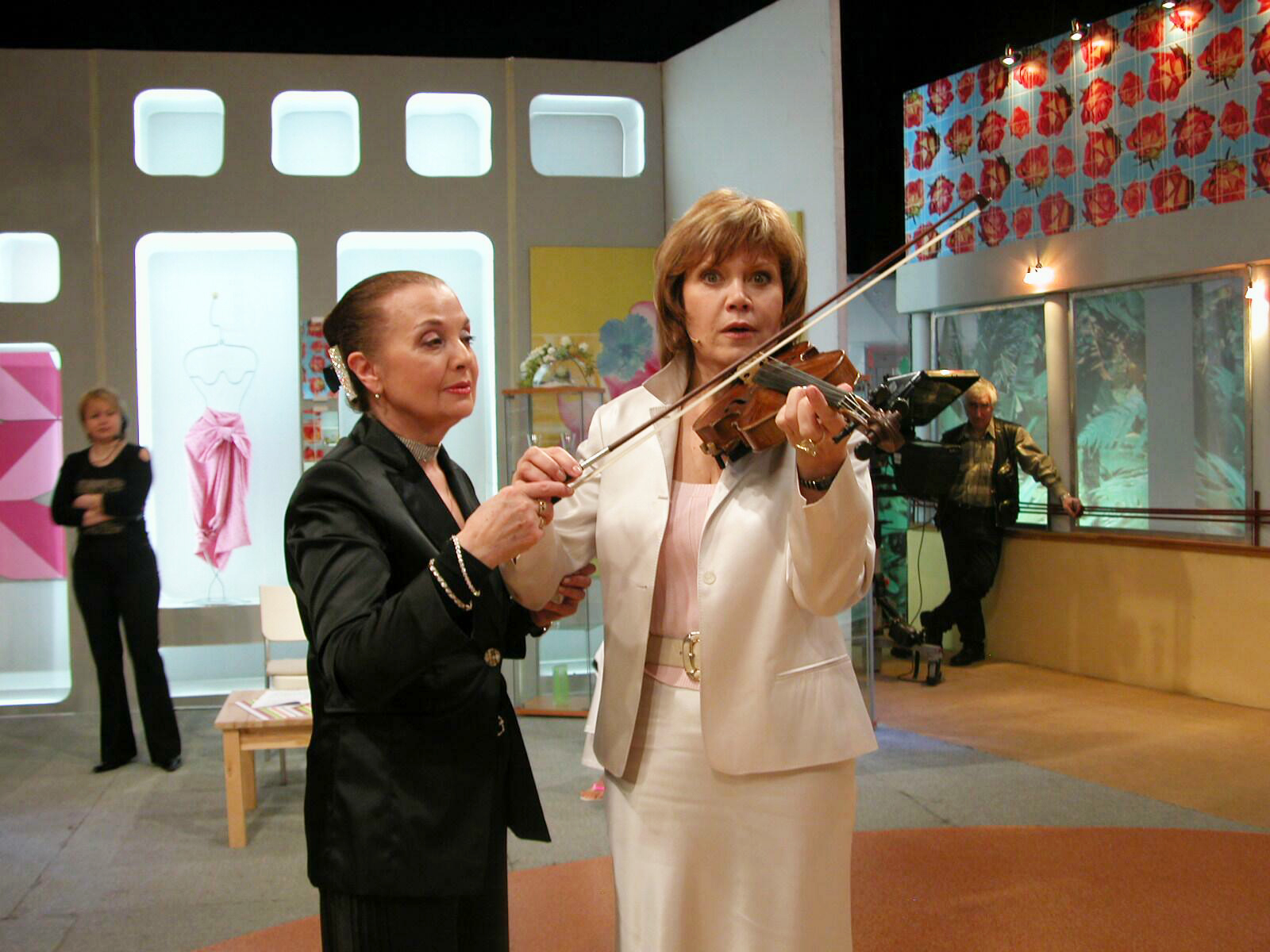
Svetlana Bezrodnaya and Larisa Krivtsova

Svetlana Borisovna Bezrodnaya (Russian: Светла́на Бори́совна Безро́дная; nee Levina (Russian: Ле́вина), born 12 February 1934, Barvikha, USSR) is a Soviet and Russian violinist and conductor. Artistic director of the State Academic Chamber Vivaldi-orchestra. She was awarded of People's Artist of Russia in 1996.
