= Ruzhena Sikora =

Soviet singer (1918–2006)

- Ружена Сикора
- Born: Ружена Владимировна Сикора; 20 August 1918; Novorossiysk, Soviet Russia
- Died: 23 December 2006 (aged 87); Moscow, Russian Federation
- Occupations: singer pedagogue
- Years active: 1940s – 1980s
- Spouses: Viktor Goryshnik; Nikolai Taranenko
- Awards: People's Artist of Russia (1993)

Ruzhena Vladimirovna Sikora (Russian: Ружена Владимировна Сикора; 20 August 1918 – 23 December 2006) was a Soviet traditional pop and jazz performer of Czech and Polish origins, highly popular in the late 1940s and 1950s. Sikora is credited with being the first Soviet artist to have started performing international jazz, swing and pop standards in their respective original languages.

== Biography ==
Ruzhena Sikora was born in Novorossiysk. Her father Vladimir Vladimirovich Sikora was a second-generation Russian Czech, son of a wine-maker Vladimir Sikora Sr. who in the mid-19th century left his country for Tiflis, Georgia, then settled in Abrau-Dyurso, Krasnodar Krai. Vladimir Sikora Jr., an accountant in a local cement factory, was a part-time opera singer, well known among the Novorossiysk connoisseurs. Ruzhena's mother, Veronika Adamovna Sikora, came from Poland.

Encouraged by her father, Ruzhena began singing as a three-year-old. At the age of five she started studying the piano and four years later was able to accompany her father on a professional level, first at home, then with her own solo program at the local Pioneers' Palace and the City's Theatre.

In July 1936, Vladimir Sikora died of heart attack. To help support the family in the times when only state workers received provision cards, Ruzhena went to work at a local cement factory. In the evenings, she was playing the piano at the factory's cinema club and still managed to continue her musical education. Impressed by one of her public performances, the city authorities sent the 18-year-old to the Rostov-on-Don musical college, one of the best in the country, which she graduated in 1941, as a professional vocalist.

=== Career ===
As a student, Sikora joined Dmitry Voronin's North Caucasian Railways Orchestra, working part-time. A self-styled proponent of what later became known as the 'Theatre of Song', the girl was spotted in Baku by an established pianist, composer and conductor Alexander Tsfasman who invited her to join his own musical collective. In May 1941 she debuted as a singer of the Tsfasman-led Soviet Radio Jazz Orchestra at the All-Union Agricultural Exhibition's Green Theatre in Moscow. The young singer was looking forward to a nationwide tour after which she planned to join the Moscow Gnessin State Musical College, but then the War came.

Ruzhena Sikora continued to perform in besieged Moscow, while working with the volunteer patrol groups. She joined a small artistic frontline brigade (alongside stage entertainer Mikhail Garkavi, and dancers Anna Redel and Mikhail Khrustalyov) and embarked upon the continuous 'trenches tour'. "Strangely, in the frontline forests and trenches we felt safer than in Moscow. Our audience were enthusiastic, lively people getting themselves ready for next day's fight... Things were more depressing in hospitals. But we knew our concerts meant a lot for the injured boys and were doing our best," she remembered. Decades later, in 2005 she was awarded the Medal "For Valiant Labour in the Great Patriotic War 1941–1945".

In 1946 Sikora re-joined the Tsfasman's Orchestra. She took part in the 2nd All-Union Competition of Soviet Popular Music Performers (the first one in 1940 brought Klavdya Shulzhenko into the spotlight) and won the 1st prize. The same year Sikora debuted as a recording artist when "The Crescent in the Blue Sky" was released on record. Other popular songs of her extensive late-1940s repertoire included "A Friend", "Remembering", "Wait For You", "The Light of Stars", "Lights", "I Won't Be Writing To You", "Little Rain".

In 1947 the Radio Jazz Orchestra disbanded and, as Tsfasman became the director of the Moscow Hermitage Theatre, Sikora joined its Sympho-Jazz band. Established composers like Nikita Bogoslovsky, Matvey Blanter, Mark Fradkin, Vano Muradeli and Kirill Molchanov were now writing the originals for her. Critics praised her restrained elegance, the ability to achieve dramatic effect by simple, almost ascetic means.

The first Soviet singer to start performing foreign originals in different languages (Czech, Polish, Italian, French, Spanish), she received serious chastising in the Soviet press in 1955, blamed (by Sovyetskaya Kultura newspaper) for, among other things, condoning the 'hostile ideology' by performing songs of 'dubious origins'. Several years earlier such verdict could mean serious trouble, but the mid-1950s anti-'West-worshippers' campaign was the last of its kind. Sikora's success continued, she visited Poland, Bulgaria and East Germany with solo concerts.

In the early 1950s Sikora married pianist Viktor Goryshnik who became her accompanist on stage. In the early 1960s the pair suffered a serious car accident. Goryshnik died, Ruzhena Sikora spent seven months in hospital. Later the singer returned on stage, then married band leader Nikolai Taranenko. But giving full-time concerts for her was becoming more and more difficult and in the 1970s she had to quit, continuing to teach vocals, at the Central House of Artists in Moscow.

After the retirement, Sikora appeared on stage twice, first at the Alexander Vertinsky memorial, alongside Nikita Bogoslovsky and Bulat Okudzhava. Then in February 1993 music historian and writer Valery Safoshkin organized the Ruzhena Sikora special concert at the Moscow Central House of Artists. In the finale of this highly successful show the legendary performer Izabella Yuryeva rose on stage to present the bouquet of flowers to Ruzhena Sikora. Also in 1993 she was granted the prestigious title of the People's Artist of Russia.

Ruzhena Vladimirovna Sikora died on 23 December 2006 in Moscow. She was buried at the Khimkinskoye Cemetery.
