= Ivan, Boris et moi =

Single by Marie Laforêt
- Language: French
- Released: 1967
- Label: Disques Festival
- Composer(s): Émile Stern
- Lyricist(s): Eddy Marnay

Music video
- "Ivan, Boris et moi" (ORTF, 1967) on YouTube

"Ivan, Boris et moi" is a song by French singer Marie Laforêt. It initially appeared in 1967 on her EP titled Marie Laforêt vol. XIV (also called Ivan, Boris et moi).

== Composition ==
The song was written by Émile Stern and Eddy Marnay.

== Track listings ==
7-inch EP Marie Laforêt vol. XIV (1967, Festival FX 1545)

A1. "Ivan, Boris et moi"
A2. "Je ne peux rien promettre"
B1. "Pour celui qui viendra"
B2. "Tom"

== Charts ==
"Ivan, Boris et moi" / "Tom"

Chart (1967)	Peak position
Belgium (Ultratop 50 Wallonia)	15

== Covers ==
There are two Russian versions of this song, "Tri plus pyat'" (Russian: Три плюс пять, lit. "Three plus five"), adapted by Leonid Kukso and recorded by Alla Yoshpe, and "Anton, Ivan, Boris'" (Russian: Антон, Иван, Борис), recorded by Edita Piekha.
