= Stahan Rakhimov =

Uzbek singer (1937–2021)

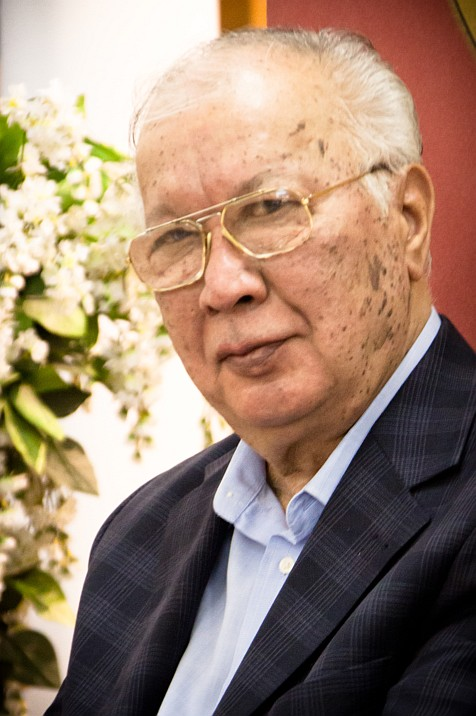
Stahan Rahimov in 2012

Stahan Mamadzhanovich Rakhimov (Uzbek: Staxan Rahimov, Russian: Стаха́н Мамаджа́нович Рахи́мов; December 17, 1937 – March 12, 2021) was a Soviet Uzbek and Russian singer, People's Artist of Russia (2002).

== Biography ==
Stahan Rakhimov was born in 1937 in Andijan, Uzbekistan. His mother, the future famous singer, People's Artist of the Uzbek SSR Shahodat Rakhimova came from a wealthy family. However, when it came time to marry, she ran to the theater, which she had dreamed about all her life. Nobody remembers what happened to nearly paid the bride money, but then broke the scandal, it seems, forever preserved in the local epic legends.

When Shahodat was sent to Moscow to the conservatory for training, she took Stahan with her. Here he graduated from high school and became a student of Moscow Power Engineering Institute.

In 1960, participating in the final competition of amateur high school he met his true love Alla Yoshpe. Since 1963, the duo went to a professional pop scene, where they invariably contributed to the success. They became famous, traveling almost all over the huge Soviet country and halfway around the world as well.

In the 1970s, Alla's health suddenly worsened, she had surgery with no or little improvement. They were seeking some help from abroad, but they were denied the permission by the Ministry of Health.

In 1979 they decided to apply for emigration to Israel.

The authorities' response followed immediately, not only were Alla and Stahan not allowed to leave the country, but they were declared as enemies of the country and banned from performing on stage. All of their recordings on radio and television have been demagnetized. The subsequent decade Rakhimov and Yoshpe spent practically under house arrest.

And only in the late 1980s the curtain of silence had got slightly lifted for them. They were allowed to sing in small district centers, and then to the principal stages of the country.

Then Alla Yoshpe and Stahan Rakhimov performed on TV and radio, in concert halls in Russia and abroad.
