= Sergei Zakharov (singer) =

Russian singer (1950–2019)

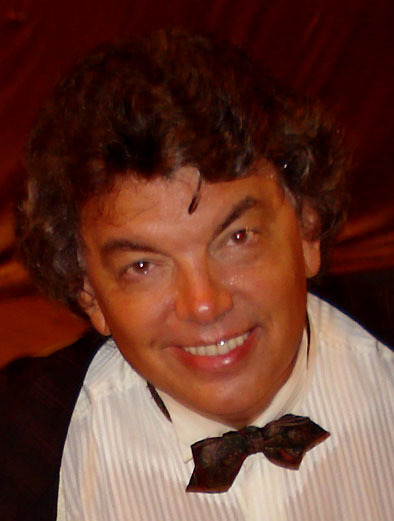

Background information
- Born: Sergey Georgievich Zakharov; 1 May 1950; Mykolaiv, Ukrainian SSR
- Died: 13 February 2019 (aged 68) Moscow, Russia
- Occupation: Baritone singer
- Instrument: Vocals

Sergey Georgievich Zakharov (Russian: Серге́й Гео́ргиевич Заха́ров; 1 May 1950 – 13 February 2019) was a Russian singer who had a rare lyrical baritone.

== Biography ==
Zakharov was born on 1 May 1950 in Mykolaiv in the Ukrainian SSR (then part of the Soviet Union, now Ukraine) in a military family. In 1971 he entered the operetta department of the Gnessin State Musical College in Moscow in the class of Margarita Landa, and while still a student became the soloist of the State Variety Orchestra conducted by Leonid Utyosov.

In 1974 he was the winner of music competitions Golden Orpheus and Sopot International Song Festival.

Beginning in 1985, he worked independently, first with his own band, then since 1991, with pianist Alexander Kogan.

Curator of the International Festival of Russian Song of Great Britain since 2011.

He died of heart failure on 14 February 2019, at the age of 68, in a hospital in Moscow.

== Awards ==
- Honored Artist of RSFSR (1988)
- People's Artist of Russia (1996)
- Repeated winner of Soviet, Russian and international competitions

== Discography ==
- Sergei Zakharov Sings
- Oh, You My Ancient Romance
- Centripetal Force. Pop Songs
- On Delicate Keys of the Soul
- Russian Romances and Songs
- About You and About Myself
- You My Old Romance
- Touch of Love
- Oh, If I Could Express in a Sound...
- Stay with Me
- The Secret
- Autumn Woman
- The Best of
- Listen to me My Dear...
- I Come Out Alone On the Road...
- Zakharov with Kalinin

== Videography ==
- Heavenly Swallows
- Solo Concert
- Unknown Zakharov
- Star Show
- Jubilee
