= Odyniec =

Odyniec is a Polish surname.

- Antoni Edward Odyniec, Polish poet
- Wacław Odyniec (1922–1999), Polish historian, professor
- Wincenty Odyniec (1865–1952) Russian imperial and Polish general

== See also ==
- Odyniec coat of arms
- Odinets
