= Alexey Sheynin =

Russian theatrical actor (born 1947)

Alexey Sheynin PAR
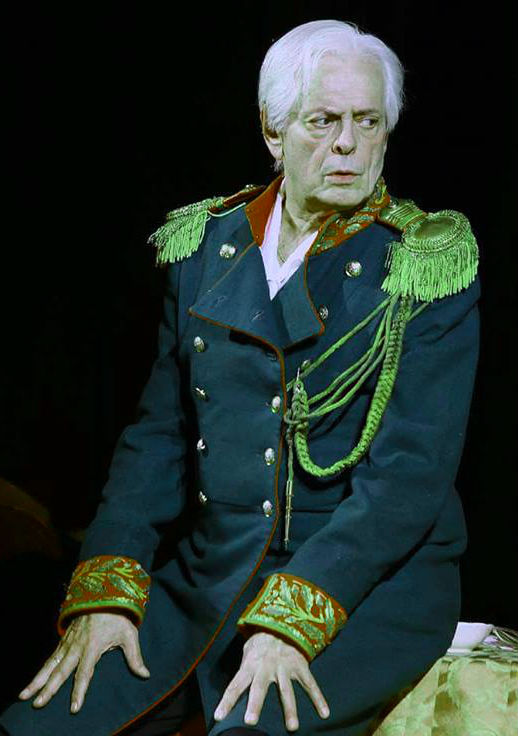
- Sheynin as Alexander III of Russia
- Born: Alexey Igorevich Sheynin; December 18, 1947 (age 78); Leningrad, USSR
- Occupation: actor
- Years active: 1968 — present

Alexey Igorevich Sheynin (Russian: Алексей Игоревич Шейнин; born December 18, 1947, Leningrad) is a Soviet and Russian drama theater and film actor.

== Biography ==
Born in Leningrad on December 18, 1947, Alexey Sheynin graduated in 1968 from the theater studio at the Leningrad Youth Theater (under the tutelage of Zinovy Korogodsky). He worked at the Leningrad Comedy Theater and has been with the Yermolova Theatre since 1970. He also graduated from the Institute of Culture, specializing in directing.

Sheynin is a teacher at GITIS and also teaches at the Russian Theater Institute.

== Personal life ==
His first wife was actress Nelly Pshennaya, with whom he had a daughter named Yeugenia. Yeugenia died from cancer in 2015. His second wife, Annie, is a two-time French champion in show jumping.

== Awards ==
- Honored Artist of the RSFSR (1985)
- People's Artist of Russia (1999)
