= Valery Kritskov =

Russian conductor

Valery Kritskov (Russian: Валерий Крицков) is a Russian conductor.

== Biography ==
He took conducting lessons at the Moscow Institute of Culture which were taught by Kirill Tikhonov. He graduated from there in 1988 and then worked in Moscow-based Helikon Opera till he got employed with Novaya Opera in 2002.

While there, he conducted many operas including Nikolai Rimsky-Korsakov's The Snow Maiden and The Tsar’s Bride as well as Anton Rubinstein's The Demon and Tchaikovsky's The Maid of Orleans. He also conducted works by the Italian composers such as Pietro Mascagni's Cavalleria rusticana and Ruggero Leoncavallo's Pagliacci and German such as Richard Wagner's Lohengrin and Strauss' Die Fledermaus as well as a concert dedicated to Vincenzo Bellini. Besides operas, he is also known for his conducting of the Russian ballet based on works by Tchaikovsky and Sergei Prokofiev as well as German and Austrian ballet composers such as Ludwig Minkus and Charles Gounod. Later on, he became a conductor of the Coppélia ballet which was based by Léo Delibes work and was produced by Imperial Russian Ballet. Currently he has two CD recordings called Chorus of the Novaya Opera Theatre of Moscow and the Soloists of the Novaya Opera Theatre of Moscow.
