= Vladislav Zolotaryov =

Russian composer

Vladislav Andreyevich Zolotaryov (Russian: Владислав Андреевич Золотарёв, De-Kastri, September 13, 1942 – Moscow, May 13, 1975) was a Soviet composer and bayanist. He is regarded as one of the greatest Soviet composers for bayan.

He graduated from the class of N. A. Lesnoi (bayan) at the Magadan Secondary School of Music in 1968, and studied composition under the guidance of R. K. Shchedrin (by way of consultation, 1968–1969), and with T. N. Khrennikov (at the Moscow Conservatoire, 1971–1972). He composed large-scale and chamber compositions, string quartets and vocal music, but is best known for his works for bayan (button accordion).

Friedrich Lips and A. Surkov wrote in Anthology of Compositions for Button Accordion: "The creative work of Vl. Zolotaryov can be described as a milestone of the utmost importance for the incontestable progress of accordion music. . . . In his Partita (1968), Six Children's Suites (1969/74), his Sonata N° 2 (1971) and Sonata No. 3 (1972), and Five Compositions (1971), the advantages of the new-type [converter free-bass] accordion have, as never before, been wholly revealed. The instrument has become a full and equal participant in the chamber sphere of art music."

Zolotaryov committed suicide at age 32.
