= Friedrich Lips =

Russian bayanist/accordionist

Friedrich Robertovitch Lips
- Фридрих Робертович Липс
- Born: November 18, 1948 (age 77); Yemanzhelinsk, Russian SFSR, Soviet Union (present-day Russia)
- Occupations: Bayanist, accordionist

Friedrich Robertovitch Lips (Note: Russian: Фридрих Робертович Липс, romanized: Fridrikh Robertovich Lips) (born November 18, 1948) is a Russian bayanist and accordionist of German origin. Since 1989 he has been professor of the bayan accordion department at the Gnesin Russian Academy of Music, one of two music academies in Moscow. He worked as a soloist, chamber musician, arranger, book author and teacher. In 1994 he was honored as a People's Artist of the Russian Federation.

== Biography ==
Friedrich Lips was born in 1948 to parents of German origin in the city of Yemanzhelinsk (Chelyabinsk district). In 1967 he finished his education at the "Mikhail Glinka" music school in Magnitogorsk in the class of E. Kudinov (bayan, conducting). He then went to Moscow to the Gnesin State Institute for Music Education, where he was a master student of Sergey Kolobkov and took his exams in his class in 1972 (bayan, conducting) and completed his postgraduate education in 1974.

From 1971 onwards he himself worked as a teacher at the Gnesin Institute. In 1980 he was appointed lecturer and in 1989 professor. Since 1996 he has been head of the Folk Instruments Department - to which the bayan accordion is assigned - at the institute, which has since been renamed the Russian Academy of Music. As a visiting professor, he taught at institutions and academies in Irun, Spain; Groningen, Netherlands; Royal Academy of Music, London; Tianjin, Shanghai, China. As a guest lecturer, he is internationally active in seminars, master classes and educational courses and also acted as a juror in music competitions. In 1989 he founded the international music festival "Bayan and Bayanists" in Moscow, which he chairs as Artistic Director, and initiated the Moscow Music Prize "Silver Disc" for bayan/accordion soloists.

During his work as a teacher, many musicians emerged from his classes who have since become award winners of national and international competitions, concert musicians and educators. As a performing artist, Friedrich Lips was first prize winner at the international music competition in Klingenthal (GDR) in 1969. In 1970 he was signed to the state Soviet concert agency Goskoncert. This is how he started his career as a concert virtuoso and chamber musician. In the following 30 years of uninterrupted concert activity, concerts took him to the US, Canada, China, France, Spain, Italy, Switzerland, Austria, Germany, the Netherlands, Japan, Norway, Denmark, to concert halls (including the Great Hall of the Moscow Conservatory, Concertgebouw Amsterdam, Suntory Hall Tokyo, Lincoln Center New York, JF Kennedy Center Washington, to the musicians Gidon Kremer, Vladimir Igolinsky, Yo-Yo Ma, Vladimir Tonkha, Mark Pekarski and to the composers Sergey Berinsky, Mikhail Bronner, Alexander Kholminov, Evgeny Derbenko, Edison Denisov, Sofia Gubaidulina, Efrem Podgaits, Alfred Schnittke, Vladislav Zolotaryov, Kirill Volkov, Roman Ledenyov, Tatyana Sergeyeva, Vladimir Ryabov.

== Significance ==
He has worked in chamber music ensembles and has given concerts with orchestras under the direction of Gennady Rozhdestvensky, Vladimir Spivakov, Yuri Bashmet, Oleg Agarkov, Timur Mynbayev, Yuri Nikolayevsky, Yūji Takahashi, Luca Pfaff, Lev Markis, Dmitry Liss, and Valery Gergiev. Many works were dedicated to him personally, more than 50 works were premiered by himself and 100 compositions - on more than 30 CDs - recorded and published in various countries in America, Europe and Asia. The CD Seven Words, released in Moscow, was awarded the "Diapason d’or" as CD of the year in Paris in 1991. In the US, the CD "Russian and Trepak" was awarded the 3rd prize in a competition organized by Just Plain Folks Music Awards 2006 in the category classical among solo albums with 25,500 nominated CDs.

He is also the author of music theory writings, articles and specialist books of importance. e.g. The Art of Bayan Playing (Kamen, 1991), The Art of Bayan Playing (Kamen, 2000), The Art of Editing Classical Music for Accordion (Kamen, 2017), The Art of Arranging Classical music for Accordion (Kamen, 2018), It seems like yesterday ... (Moscow, 2018).

== Awards ==
- 1993 Silver disc of the festival "Bayan and bayanists"
- 1994 State award "People's Artist of Russia"
- 2001 Musical Review: "Person of the Year"
- 2001 Order of Friendship
- 2005 Children's Art School No. 1 in Yemanzhelinsk was named after its first graduate Friedrich Lips
- 2006 honorary citizen of the Yemanzhelinsk district of the Chelyabinsk region
- 2008 "Bright Past" award from the O. Mityaev Foundation and the government of the Chelyabinsk region
- 2008 Gold medal of the Moscow Security Committee on the twentieth anniversary of the Moscow Autumn Festival
- 2008 "Merit Award" of the Confédération Internationale des Accordéonistes
- 2009 Russian Performing Arts Foundation: Golden Talent of Russia Diploma
- 2010 Honorary Professor at the London Academy of Music (Great Britain)
- 2011 Moscow City Prize
- 2015 laureate of the International Music Education Prize Ippolitova-Ivanova named after him
- 2019 As part of the "2019 World Music Awards", Friedrich Lips was voted "Musician of the Year" by the Accordion Stars Illustrated Magazine in New York, he received a "Lifetime Achievement Award" and was inducted into the "Accordion World Hall of Fame".

== World premieres ==
Year	Place	Composer	Piece
1971	Moscow (Soviet Union)	Vladislav Solotaryov	Sonata N° 2 (dedicated to Fridrikh Lips)
1972	Moscow (Soviet Union)	Vladislav Solotaryov	Sonata N° 3 (dedicated to Fridrikh Lips)
1975	Moscow (Soviet Union)	Alexander Shurbin	Fantasy and Fugue (dedicated to Fridrikh Lips)
1975	Moscow (Soviet Union)	Alexander Shurbin	Toccata (neue Bearbeitung)
1975	Moscow (Soviet Union)	Vladislav Solotaryov	Five compositions
1975	Moscow (Soviet Union)	Vladislav Solotaryov	Children Suite N° 4
1975	Moscow (Soviet Union)	Vladislav Solotaryov	Children Suite N° 6
1976	Moscow (Soviet Union)	Vladislav Solotaryov	Spanish Rhapsody "Ispaniada" (dedicated to Fridrikh Lips)
1976	Moscow (Soviet Union)	Vladislav Solotaryov	Monastery of Ferapont
1976	Moscow (Soviet Union)	Vladislav Solotaryov	Children Suite N° 5
1977	Moscow (Soviet Union)	Kirill Volkov	Sonata N° 1 (dedicated to Fridrikh Lips)
1977	Moscow (Soviet Union)	Vladislav Solotaryov	"Concert Symphony N° 1" for bayan and symphony orchestra
1978	Moscow (Soviet Union)	Alexander Shurbin	Concert-Diptych (new arrangement)
1978	Moscow (Soviet Union)	Vladimir Podgorny	Prelude in memory of Vl. Solotaryov
1979	Moscow (Soviet Union)	Nikita Bogoslovsky	Three Russian Pieces: Fairy tale, Round dance, Dance
1980	Moscow (Soviet Union)	Kirill Volkov	Sonata N° 2
1980	Moscow (Soviet Union)	Sofia Gubaidulina	De profundis (dedicated to Fridrikh Lips)
1982	Moscow (Soviet Union)	Alexander Shurbin	Sonata N° 2 "Nostalgia" (dedicated to Fridrikh Lips)
1982	Moscow (Soviet Union)	Pyotr Londonov	Scherzo-Toccata
1982	Moscow (Soviet Union)	Sofia Gubaidulina	Partita "Seven Words" for bayan, violoncello and chamber orchestra (dedicated to Fridrikh Lips and Vladimir Tonkha)
1984	Moscow (Soviet Union)	Alexander Shurbin	Sonata N° 3 "Walk through Neskutchny sad" (dedicated to Fridrikh Lips)
1984	Moscow (Soviet Union)	Vladimir Podgorny	Fantasy on the Ukrainian folk song "Hey Thou Wind, blow up your country", 2nd arrangement (dedicated to Fridrikh Lips)
1986	Oslo (Norway)	Trygve Madsen	Partita in 4 parts for 2 bayans
1987	Moscow (Soviet Union)	Sofia Gubaidulina	Sonate "Et exspecto" in 5 Sätzen (dedicated to Fridrikh Lips)
1987	Moscow (Soviet Union)	Jewgenij Derbenko	Toccata (dedicated to Fridrikh Lips)
1987	Moscow (Soviet Union)	Edison Denisov	Fantasy on Soviet songs from the 1930s "The steamer drives past the harbor" for bayan, piano and percussion
1989	Karstula (Finland)	Yevgeny Derbenko	Prelude and Toccata
1990	Sotshi (Soviet Union)	Vladimir Belyayev	Sonata N° 1 (dedicated to Fridrikh Lips)
1991	Moscow (Soviet Union)	Sergey Berinsky	"Il dolce dolore" for bayan and violoncello
1991	Moscow (Soviet Union)	Alexander Rosenblat	"Waltz and Blues for two" for bayan and violoncello
1991	Moscow (Soviet Union)	Vladislav Solotaryov	"Concert Symphony N° 2" for bayan and symphony orchestra
1991	Moscow (Soviet Union)	Kirill Wolkow	"Stichera" for bayan and violoncello (dedicated to Fridrikh Lips and Vladimir Tonkha)
1991	Brussels (Belgium)	Sergey Berinsky	Partita "Also sprach Zarathustra" (dedicated to Fridrikh Lips)
1992	Amsterdam (Netherlands)	Bogdan Precz	Praeambulum and Toccata (dedicated to Fridrikh Lips)
1992	Moscow (Soviet Union) – Russian premiere	Sofia Gubaidulina	"Silenzio", Five Pieces for bayan, violin and violoncello
1993	Moscow (Russia)	Sergey Berinsky	Three pieces in "mauvais" style
1994	Moscow (Russia)	Gioacchino Rossini/Yevgeny Derbenko	Tarantella
1994	Moscow (Russia)	Sergey Berinsky	"Miserere" for soprano, bayan and piano (dedicated to Fridrikh Lips and Svyatoslav Lips)
1995	Klingenthal (Germany)	Vladimir Kobekin	"Holiday for two" for bayan and percussion
1995	Amsterdam (Netherlands)	Boudewijn Tarenskeen	"Requiem" for bayan and violoncello
1995	Amsterdam (Netherlands)	Alexander Larin	Three pieces for bayan
1996	Moscow (Russia)	Sergej Berinskij	Symphony N° 3 "... and the sky darkened" (Apocalypse, chapter 6) for bayan and symphony orchestra
1996	Moscow (Russia)	Alexander Wustin	"The Disappearance" for bayan, violoncello and chamber orchestra (dedicated to Fridrikh Lips and Vladimir Tonka)
1996	Moscow (Russia)	Edison Denisov	"From dusk to light" for bayan
1997	Amsterdam (Netherlands)	Alfred Schnittke	"Two little pieces for organ" (Version for bayan)
1997	Amsterdam (Netherlands)	Wladimir Rjabow	"The River of Love", Capriccio for bayan (dedicated to Fridrikh Lips)
1997	Groningen (Niederlande)	Sergey Berinsky	"Light waves" (dedicated to Fridrikh Lips and Miny Dekkers)
1997	Portogruaro (Italien)	Sergey Berinsky	"Sea World", Poem for violin and bayan
1997	Moscow (Russia)	Sergey Berinsky	"Cinema"
1997	Moscow (Russia)	Mikhail Bronner	"Dream Garden" for bayan and violoncello (dedicated to Fridrikh Lips and Vladimir Tonkha)
1998	Moscow (Russia)	Roman Ledenyov	"... against the background of a Russian landscape" (dedicated to Fridrikh Lips)
1998	Moscow (Russia)	Tatyana Sergeyeva	"Yasmine", Tango for bayan and piano (dedicated to Fridrikh Lips and Svyatoslav Lips)
1998	Portogruaro (Italy)	Mikhail Bronner	"Evenings near Moscow" for bayan, clarinet, violin, cello and double bass
1999	Moscow (Russia)	Mikhail Bronner	"Judas-Passion" for bayan and chamber orchestra (dedicated to Fridrikh Lips)
1999	Moscow (Russia)	Alexander Kholminow	"Symphony" for bayan solo (dedicated to Fridrikh Lips)
1999	Moscow (Russia)	Efrem Podgaits	"Fantasy in memory of Alfred Schnittke" (dedicated to Fridrikh Lips)
2000	Kuhmo (Finland)	Merab Gagnidze	"No comment" for bayan
2001	Moscow (Russia)	Tatyana Sergeyeva	"Dark-red rose" Tango for Quintett "Piazzolla-Studio"
2002	Klingenthal (Deutschland)	Efrem Podgaits	"Lips Concert" for bayan and symphony orchestra
2003	Stockholm (Sweden)	Sofia Gubaidulina	"Under the Sign of Scorpio" (Variations on Six Hexachords) for bayan and symphony orchestra
2003	Milwaukee (USA)	Efrem Podgaits	"Ex Animo" for bayan and string quartet (dedicated to Fridrikh Lips and Fine Arts Quartet)
2004	Moscow (Russia)	Mikhail Bronner	"Katuv" for bayan, piano and symphony orchestra (dedicated to Fridrikh Lips and Svyatoslav Lips)
2006	Moscow (Russia)	Roman Ledenyov	"Evening love songs" for bayan (dedicated to Fridrikh Lips)
2006	Moscow (Russia)	Alexander Kholminov	"Autumn melody" for bayan (dedicated to Fridrikh Lips)
2006	Moscow (Russia)	Efrem Podgaits	Sonata in 3 movements (dedicated to Fridrikh Lips)
2006	Milwaukee (USA)	Yehuda Yannay	"Bayannayab" for 2 bayans
2008	Moscow (Russia)	Giya Kancheli	"KAPOTE" for bayan and chamber orchestra (Russian premiere)
2008	Moscow (Russia)	Efrem Podgaits	"Viva voce" – Concert N° 2 for chamber orchestra (dedicated to Fridrikh Lips)
2008	Moscow (Russia)	Efrem Podgaits	"Ave Maria" for violoncello and bayan (dedicated to Fridrikh Lips and Vladimir Tonkha)
2008	Moscow (Russia)	Efrem Podgaits	"Cocktail Rio Rita " for bayan, violin, violoncello, piano and percussion (dedicated to Fridrikh Lips)
2008	Moscow (Russia)	Mikhael Bronner	"Eclipse" (dedicated to Fridrikh Lips)
2008	Moscow (Russia)	Roman Ledenyov	"Ave Maria" for violoncello and bayan
2009	Moscow (Russia)	Tatyana Sergeyeva	"Amaryllis" for bayan and piano (dedicated to Fridrikh Lips and Svyatoslav Lips)
2010	Moscow (Russia)	Alexander Kholminov	Concert for bayan and large symphony orchestra (dedicated to Fridrikh Lips)
2011	Moscow (Russia)	Tatyana Sergeyeva	"Night Flowers" for bayan and piano (dedicated to Fridrikh Lips and Svyatoslav Lips)
2011	Moscow (Russia)	Sofia Gubaidulina	"Tatarian dance" for bayan and two double basses (Russian premiere)
2011	Moscow (Russia)	Sofia Gubaidulina	"Fachwerk" for bayan and strings (Russian premiere)
2012	Moscow (Russia)	Mikhael Bronner	"Seven Jewish Songs" for bayan and chamber orchestra
2013	Minsk (Belarus)	Konstantin Yaskov	"Hymn to Aphrodite" for bayan and chamber orchestra
2013	Evora (Portugal)	Alexander Kholminov	"Moment" for bayan (dedicated to Fridrikh Lips)
2017	Moskau (Russia)	Mikhail Bronner	"I float on waves of love", eight sonnets for bayan and chamber orchestra
2018	Moskau (Russia)	Efrem Podgaits	"Double Mirror" for bayan, violoncello and symphony orchestra
2018	Moskau (Russia)	Efrem Podgaits	"Odessa-Quodlibet" for violin, bayan, violoncello and piano
2020	Moskau (Russia)	Alexander Tchaikovsky	Sonata in two parts
2021	Moskau (Russia)	Mikhail Bronner	"Jewish Holidays"
2021	Moskau (Russia)	Mikhail Bronner	Dolce appassionato
