= Odinets =

Odinets is a gender-neutral Russian surname derived from the nickname одинец literally meaning "single person", e.g., a single son, a peasant without family. It may refer to the following notable people:

- Dmitry Odinets (1883–1950), Russian Empire politician and Ukrainian statesman
- Eduard Odinets (born 1976), Estonian politician

== See also ==
- Odintsov
- Odyniec
