= Mark Fradkin =

Soviet composer

- Марк Фрадкин
- Born: May 4, 1914; Vitebsk, Russian Empire (present-day Belarus)
- Died: April 4, 1990 (aged 75); Moscow, Russian SFSR, Soviet Union
- Resting place: Novodevichy Cemetery
- Education: Leningrad Theatre Institute
- Occupations: Composer, songwriter, memoirist
- Years active: 1940s–1990
- Awards: People's Artist of the USSR (1985); USSR State Prize (1979)

Mark Grigoryevich Fradkin (Note: Russian: Марк Григорьевич Фрадкин, romanized: Mark Grigoryevich Fradkin; Belarusian: Марк Рыгоравіч Фрадкін, romanized: Mark Ryhoravich Fradkin) (May 4, 1914 – April 4, 1990) was a Soviet composer, author of numerous popular songs (many of which were co-written with poet Yevgeny Dolmatovsky) and musical scores for forty films. In 1979, Mark Fradkin received the USSR State Prize and, in 1985, he was granted the status of the People’s Artist of the USSR.

== Biography ==
Mark Fradkin was born in Vitebsk, Russian Empire (now Belarus), to a family of doctors. In the 1920s, having graduated from the technological secondary school, Mark joined a clothing factory in Vitebsk. After two years there, he joined the Third Belorussian Theatre as an actor (later musical administrator). In 1934, he enrolled in the Leningrad Theatre Institute where he started writing music. In 1938-1939, he studied in the Belorussian Conservatory under the guidance of Professor Aladov while working as an actor in the Minsk Children Theater (ТЮЗ).

In 1939, Fradkin was mobilized into the Soviet Army. As a conductor of the Kiev Red Army orchestra, he started co-writing songs with poet Yevgeny Dolmatovsky. In 1943, still on an endless front-line tour performing for Soviet fighters, Fradkin was awarded the Order of the Red Star. In 1944, he became a member of the Soviet Union of Composers and moved to Moscow. Among his popular war-time songs were "The Dnieper Song", "Chance Meeting Waltz", "A Street in Bryansk". After the war, he had a string of hits ("Welcome to Saratov", "The Waiting", "Birches", "We Were Just Neighbours", "Beyond the Factory Gate", "Komsomol Volunteers", "The Song of Tenderness", "As Years Fly By", "Farevell You Doves", "As Volga Flows") performed by the stars of the Soviet popular music, like Mark Bernes, Lyudmila Zykina, Ruzhena Sikora, Eduard Hil, Iosif Kobzon. One of the better known Fradkin songs of the 1970s, a war-themed epic, "For Another Guy" (lyrics by Robert Rozhdestvensky), brought Lev Leshchenko the First Prize at the 1972 Sopot International Song Festival. In 1979, Mark Fradkin was awarded the USSR State Prize and, in 1985, the prestigious People's Artist of the USSR status. His book of memoirs, My Biography, was published in 1974.

Mark Grigoryevich Fradkin died on April 4, 1990. He was buried at the Novodevichye Cemetery in Moscow.

== Family ==
Mark Fradkin's father, Grigory Konstantinovich Fradkin, a medical doctor in Kursk, was executed by the White Army troops retreating from the city in 1920. His mother, Yevgenya Mironovna Fradkina (née Shagalova), also a medical doctor, was murdered during the Holocaust, along with many other Vitebsk Jews, by the Nazis.

== Selected filmography ==
- They Were the First (1956)
- A Simple Story (1960)
- Songs of the Sea (1970)
