= Odintsov, Belgorod Oblast =

Odintsov Одинцов
- Khutor
- Location within Belgorod Oblast Location within Russia
- Coordinates: 50°33′N 37°41′E
- Country: Russia
- Region: Belgorod Oblast
- District: Volokonovsky District
- Time zone: UTC+3:00

Odintsov (Russian: Одинцов) is a rural locality (a khutor) in Volokonovsky District, Belgorod Oblast, Russia. The population was 13 as of 2010. There are 2 streets.

== Geography ==
Odintsov is located 32 km northwest of Volokonovka (the district's administrative centre) by road. Tolmachev is the nearest rural locality.
