= Anna Odintsova =

Russian ballet dancer

Anna Viktorovna Odintsova (Russian: Анна Викторовна Одинцова) is a Russian ballet dancer, prima ballerina of the Novosibirsk Opera and Ballet Theatre, Honored Artist of Russia (2014).

== Biography ==
Anna Odintsova was born in Novosibirsk. In 1998, she graduated from the Novosibirsk Choreographic School (class of L. Kondrashova) and was accepted into the troupe of the Novosibirsk Opera and Ballet Theatre.

The ballerina also graduated from Russian Presidential Academy of National Economy and Public Administration (2016) and master's degree at Vaganova Academy of Russian Ballet (2022).

In December 2022, she was appointed artistic director of the Novosibirsk Choreographic College. In 2023, Anna Odintsova became the head of the Novosibirsk Opera and Ballet Theatre ballet troupe.

== Awards ==
Anna Odintsova is a diploma winner of the Golden Mask National Theater Festival (2014). The ballet dancer also awarded with a special price of the Paradise Award (2016).
