= Valery Lantratov =

- Born: Valery Vaseilievich Lantratov; 24 April 1958 (age 68); Moscow, USSR

Valery Lantratov (Valeri Lantratov, Walerij Lantratov, Valeriy Lantratov, Russian: Валерий Лантратов; born 24 April 1958 in Moscow) is a former principal ballet dancer with the Moscow Stanislavsky Ballet and Kremlin Ballet and general director of the Russian National Ballet Foundation.

== Biography ==
A graduate of the Moscow Academic Choreographic College, Lantratov was selected as a first soloist with the State Musical Theater K. Stanislavski and V. Nemirovich-Danchenko (Moscow Stanislavski Ballet). With the theater, he danced principal rôles in such ballets as Don Quixote, Coppélia, Cinderella and Romeo and Juliet.

In 1986 Lantratov was awarded the title "Honored Artist of Russia," and in 1997, Russian president Boris Yeltsin named Lantratov “People’s Artist of Russia,” the Russian Federation's highest artistic honor.

In 1991, he was one of eight soloists in Rudolf Nureyev's "Farewell Tour" of the United Kingdom. During an engagement of this tour in Sunderland, England, Reuters reported that the music broke down during a solo "leaving... Lantratov dancing to silence."

In 1993, Lantratov began working for the Kremlin Ballet. There he danced the rôle of Napoleon Bonaparte in the ballet Napoleon, Ruslan in a production based on the work Ruslan and Ludmila directed by A. Petrov, Basil in Don Quixote, production by Vladimir Vasiliev, Tibald in Romeo and Juliet by U. Grigorovich, and Coppelius in Koppelia, production by A. Petrov.

This same year, Lantratov formed the Russian National Ballet Foundation, a Moscow-based charitable organization with the purpose of promoting the traditional art of the Russian classical ballet and providing aesthetic education. Its creation was supported by the Moscow Actors’ Charitable Foundation under the guidance of Galina Ulanova and the Stanislavsky and Nemorovich-Danchenko Moscow Musical Theater.

In 1997 he was named People's Artist of the Russian Federation.

United States

Lantratov has appeared in the United States as a guest artist with the Portland Ballet and Boston Ballet and was a guest instructor with the Boston Ballet. From 2000 to 2003 Lantratov directed one of two touring companies for SMI, Inc's Moscow Ballet and danced the rôle of Drosselmeier in the company's "Great Russian Nutcracker" production. "Valery Lantratov's Drosselmeier is young, vibrant and full of explosive energy," wrote reviewer Nancy Johnson. "The mischief in his eyes reaches the back of the house." In 2004, however, he publicly split with Moscow Ballet's U.S.-based production company.

In 2004, Lantratov premiered the rôle of Czar Nicholas II in the ballet Rasputin staged by the New Imperial Russian Ballet in St. Petersburg, Russia, with the production being taken to Moscow in 2005. The ballet, which featured Farouk Ruzimatov in the rôle of Rasputin, drew protests from Orthodox fundamentalists. Nicholas II was canonized by the Russian Orthodox Church in 2000. The protestors objected to the depiction of a saint in ballet and especially to the concept of Nicholas II costumed in tights. Lantratov arranged a photoshoot with his costume to show that he would not wear tights in the production.

== See also ==
- List of Russian ballet dancers
