= Natalya Vetlitskaya =

Soviet-Russian singer (born 1964)

Natalia Vetlitskaya
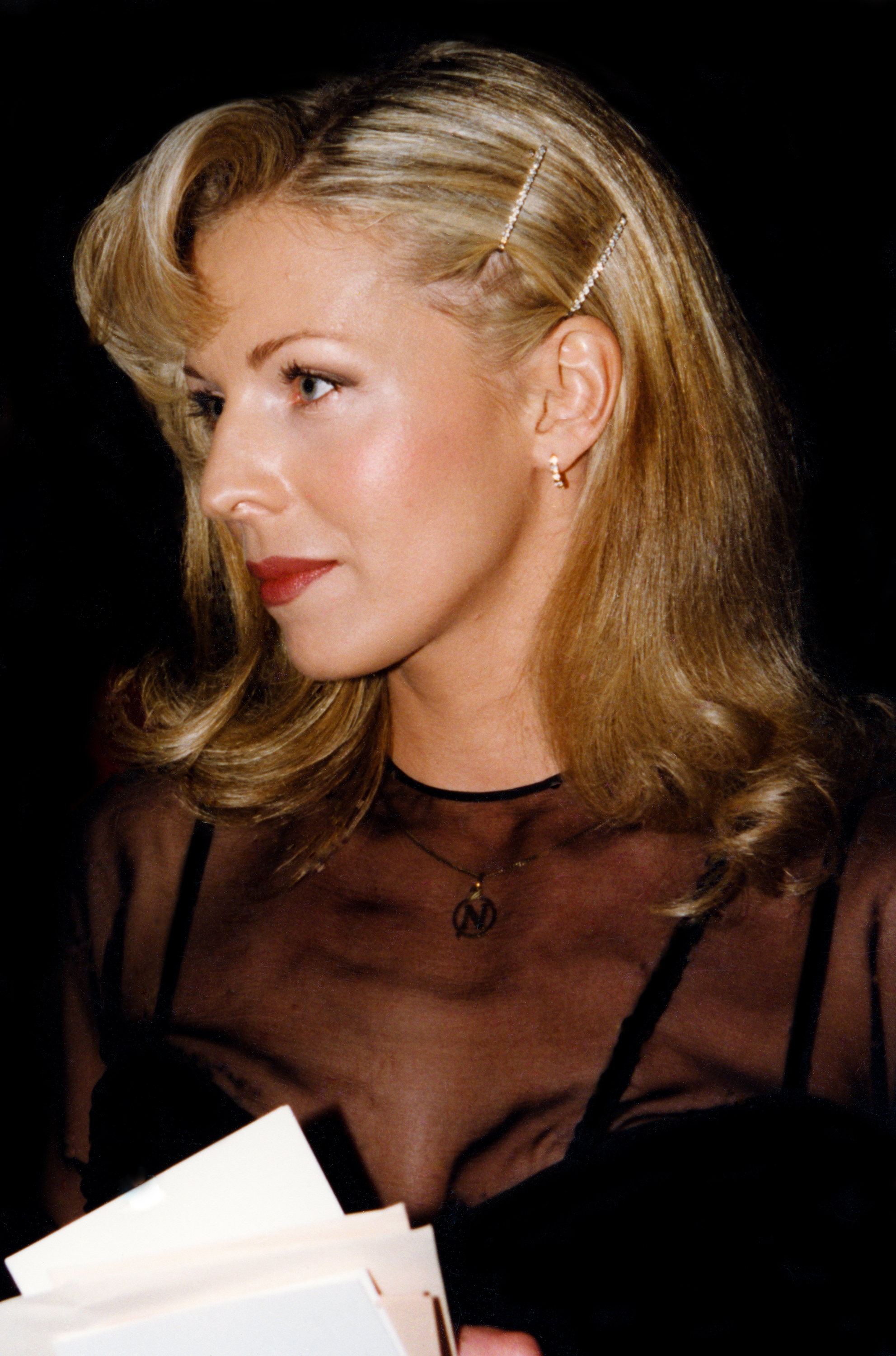

Background information
- Born: Natalia Igorevna Vetlitskaya; 17 August 1964 (age 62); Moscow, Russian SFSR, Soviet Union
- Origin: Russian
- Genres: Pop, Russian music, synthpop
- Occupation: Singer
- Instruments: vocals, piano
- Years active: 1984 — 2007, 2019 — present
- Labels: Jeff Records, Soyuz Records, Extraphone Records

Natalia Igorevna Vetlitskaya (Russian: Ната́лья И́горевна Ветли́цкая; born 17 August 1964) is a Soviet and Russian singer and actress, popular in the 1990s, who released six studio albums between 1992 and 2004. She retired from the music scene in 2009 and, as of 2018, resides in Spain.

== Biography ==
=== Early years ===
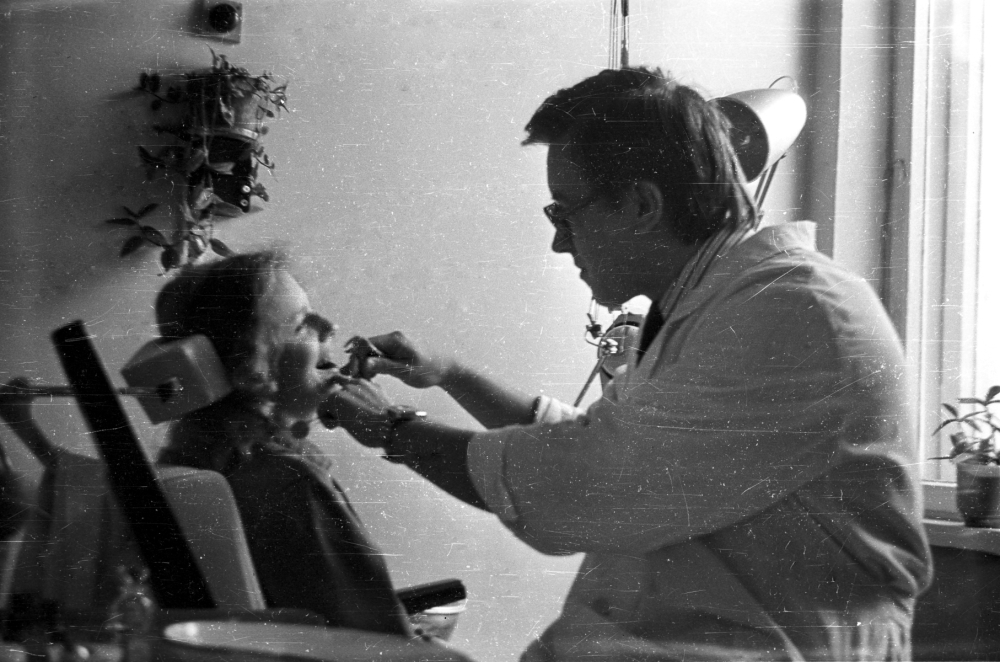
Natasha Vetlitskaya in school. Moscow, 1980.

Natalya Vetlitskaya was born in Moscow, to nuclear physicist Igor Arsenyevich (1935–2012) and his wife Yevgenia Ivanovna (born 1939), a piano teacher.

She studied at the Moscow School No.856, and, a self-described 'ugly duckling', hated sports lessons there, because, being the smallest in the class, had to stand always the last in the line. "I've always dreamt of becoming a doctor, and yet could never stop imagining myself on stage, singing or dancing," she later remembered. At the age of ten she began to study ballet and for ten years, since fourteen, was regularly taking part in dancing competitions. She enrolled into music school to learn piano, which she graduated in 1979.

In 1981 Vetlitskaya graduated from the high school with gold medal. The same year, defying her parents' wish that she should go into studying languages, she went on to start a ballet dance school of her own.

=== Career ===
Natalya Vetlitskaya started her musical career by taking part in the recording of the soundtrack for the 1983 Mary Poppins, Goodbye, written by Maksim Dunayevsky, then the head of the RSFSR Pop Music Orchestra. One of its members was Pavel Smeyan, whom Vetlitskaya married in 1983, and it was he who insisted that she start singing too, not just dance. Credited as Natalya Smeyan, she recorded one song for the film Train Out of Schedule (1985). A year earlier she debuted as an actress, having received a small part in the film Higher Than Rainbow.

In 1986 Vetlitskaya took up the job of choreographer in the Retsital Ballet. A year later, after the sisters Bazykins left the rock band Rondo, Mikhail Litvin invited to the auditioning Sveta Kolesnikova from the Vizit group, who brought in her friend, Natalya Vetlitskaya. 'But I cannot sing,' I argued. 'And I cannot dance,' she replied. So with a great deal of mutual help, in a ten days' time we prepared our own little show, got ourselves into our old school uniforms, drastically cut, and were welcomed in, she remembered. Vetlitskaya worked there as choreographer, dancer and backing vocalist, and took part in the recording of four songs which made it into the 1986 Rondo-86 album. Soon her relationships with Litvin deteriorated, though, and she left. In 1987–1988 she danced and sang for the bands Klass and Idea Fix, before joining in 1988 Mirage which she left later that year. In Mirage I earned a certain sum, 90 per cent of which I gave to my parents for them to buy a car, and the rest kept for myself, hoping this money will keep me afloat until something else comes my way, Vetlitskaya remembered.

All of her savings went into recording a jazz rock number at the SNC, the Stas Namin studio, but nothing came of it. Vetlitskaya's prospects started to look grim, but then Igor Matviyenko re-introduced her to Igor Zuyev, a young composer whom she knew from her days with Klass. "I liked his new songs and so we started to record my debut album. Then Fyodor Bondarchuk approached me, suggesting that he might shoot a clip for one of the songs, "Look Me into the Eyes". I said, okay, but I am penniless. Through some complicated financial scheme he procured the sum needed and we made this clip." Considered to be Russia's first true commercial video, it was a low-budget, unrehearsed affair. "Those people in the video were not actors, but friends and their friends, our own circle," the singer remembered.

External videos
- Look Me Into the Eyes; According to Vetlitskaya, the much discussed 'arse powdering episode' (2:58) was a trivial working moment: "I found a nail in the studio with my very expensive tights, and the makeup artist had to quickly repair the damage."

Natalya Vetlitskaya's breakthrough came in 1992 when a video for Look Me into the Eyes, her debut album's title track received the Gran Prix at the Moscow Generation-92 Festival and launched the career of Fyodor Bondarchuk, who made the clip with Tigran Keosayan and Sergey Kozlov, the latter as a cameraman. The clip, nominated for the MTV Video Music Award as well as the Eurovideo Grand Prix, made the singer famous in Russia and known in Europe.

Vetlitskaya's second album Playboy came out in 1994, the video for the title track, made by Sergey Kalvarsky, premiered on the New Year Eve to become a huge hit. It was followed by Slave to Love (1996), its title track again topping the Russian pop radio charts. In 1997 Vetlitskaya starred in the film The New Adventures of Buratino (as Alisa the Fox) and recorded three songs for the soundtrack, including Taj Mahal, a duo with Sergey Mazayev. Another unusual collaboration, with the post-punk outfit Nogu Svelo! resulted in River, the duet with the band's singer Maksim Pokrovsky, who would later sum up her appeal as intelligent femininity and feminine intelligence.

In 2003 Vetlitskaya starred as Princess Natalia in Maksim Papernik's musical Snow Queen, for which she recorded the song "Lanterns", a duet with Vadim Azarkh. Also in 2003 she performed for the last time at the festival Pesnya goda, with the song Flame of Passion. In early 2004 her sixth album My Beloved came out. Later that year Vetlitskaya gave birth to her daughter Ulyana and went into semi-retirement, only occasionally appearing on TV and releasing new songs and clips (Birdie, It's not Just) in the course of the next five years. She was expected to make a major comeback in 2009, but the announced massive tour never materialized for reasons which remained unknown. In 2009 Vetlitskaya retired from the Russian music scene and went on to reside in Spain where since then she's been leading the life of a recluse, contacting only those who share her passions for yoga and Eastern philosophies. The mystery of the sudden departure of Russia's most stylish pop singer, remained fogged in Indian incense, Muz-TV reported.

== Legacy ==
In 2011 the song Look Me into the Eyes was included into the 100 Songs That Changed Our Life list, compiled by Time Out (Russia). In December 2011 the song made it into the Best of the History of Russian Pop, 1991–2011 list, compiled by Afisha. The short editorial described Vetlitskaya as "the embodiment of everything that is likeable in Russian pop music."

Vetkitskaya's hits provide a guideline for the recent Russian pop music history. Not its mainstream version, but the one that could be called a shadowy, underground one, music critic Alexey Mazhayev argued, reviewing her 2004 The Best Of compilation. "Her song 'Look Me into the Eyes' has made a huge impact on the whole industry of Russian clip-making, while the singer herself single-handedly invented the genre of the 'pop easy listening' for Russian pop," according to the critic who described Vetlitskaya as a cult figure of the Russian music scene.

== Private life ==
Vetlitskaya's first husband was Pavel Smeyan, of the band Rock Atelier. This alliance proved to be a painful experience to Vetlitskaya who later claimed to have become victim to a severe case of domestic violence. ...He was beating me. The reason was his nature, evil and cruel. Alcohol played its part too. We divorced after he'd all but killed me... There could be no excuse for this. I was a child, just eighteen... I decided to forgive him, but could have sent him to jail, she claimed.

Vetlitskaya's marriage with Zhenya Belousov famously lasted for ten days, from 1 to 10 January 1998. It was a funny story. He said to me: Listen, one woman wants to make me marry her. I do not want to. What do I do?' We sat and we mulled this over. Then he says: Listen, why shouldn't you and me marry? And I said: Indeed! We were totally crazy and carefree... And we were just very good friends. Hung out together, were going to the parties as a pair. I loved him as a friend but for some reason never saw a man in him. There was nothing romantic about our relationship. There was another version of the story. According to the composer Lyubov Voropayeva, who worked closely with Belousov, the latter was deeply in love with Vetliyskaya and experienced shock when, on his return from a short New Year tour, he found a note informing him that the marriage was over. It was a joke for her, but tragedy for him, Voropayeva insisted.

Vetlitskaya's third husband was Kirill Kirin, originally a model, later an administrator for Philipp Kirkorov. Over the years she had relationships with Dmitry Malikov, Vlad Stashevsky, Suleyman Kerimov (who reportedly presented her an airplane as a parting gift), Mikhail Topalov (producer and businessman, father of Vlad Topalov), and Sergey Zverev. Vetlitskaya's partnership with Malikov lasted three years; it was him who's penned for her the song "Dusha" (The Soul), one of her personal favourites. In 2004 in Nice, France, Vetlitskaya gave birth to daughter Ulyana. It later transpired that the father was Vetlitskaya's fourth husband Alexey, her then yoga trainer.

Vetlitskaya, who once had a hit with a song called Playboy, appeared in the Russian version of this magazine twice, but the result produced nothing scandalous. I do not consider myself a sex symbol, besides, I am shy, she explained, why.

Since 2008 Vetlitskaya resides in Spain. She composes music, writes poetry, is engaged in painting and design. Since 1998, she has practiced Kriya Yoga, and attended the Sri Sri Ravi Shankar's courses in India. Vetlitskaya has been engaged in charity. Since 1999, she financially supported the Children's Mental Hospital No. 4, in the village of Nikolskoye, in Ruzsky District, Moscow oblast. She is a vegetarian.

== Controversies ==
In August 2011 Natalya Vetlitskaya found herself in the center of major controversy after her satyrical 'fable' describing a private all-star concert taking place at some secret residence, appeared in her blog. The figures of the 'Tsar' (who chose the occasion to grant the title of The People's Artist to a certain Big Artist) have been instantly recognised as those of Vladimir Putin and Filipp Kirkorov, respectively. She described Putin as 'charismatic' but subjected to scathing criticism somebody, easily recognised as Pyotr Shaboltai, the director of the State Kremlin Palace (and the organizer of this event), describing him as vile, obnoxious 'monster' who arose in her one strong desire: to kill him on the spot.

In 2012, after the death of her father, who spent 54 years working for ITEP, Natalya in her blog accused the head of Rosatom Sergey Kiriyenko and Director of ITEP Yuri Kozlov in her father's harassment, financial fraud and deliberate bringing Russia's nuclear industry to collapse. She called Kiriyenko the Rosatom's mafiosi general and stated that the reason of her father's death from heart attack in May 2011 was the document he'd received notifying him that his monthly salary was being cut from 4,4 to 2,8 thousand rubles.

In October 2015, her article on the website of Echo of Russia issued a sharp criticism of the spiritual, informational and political atmosphere in Russia. Highly contentious proved to be Vetlitskaya's 9 May 2016 Facebook post in which she argued that "only idiots can jump madly with joy, celebrating the Victory Day. This is the day of mourning, not joy... Those who perished should be paid tribute and glorified, personally. Not the state. This accursed state deserves nothing but contempt, she went on to say.

== Discography ==
=== Studio albums ===
- Look Me into the Eyes, 1992, Jeff Records
- Playboy, 1994, Jeff Records
- Slave to Love, 1996, Soyuz Records
- Think What You Will, 1998, Extraphone
- Just So, 1999, Soyuz
- My Beloved..., 2004, CD Land

== Awards and nominations ==
Award	Year	Nominee(s)	Category	Result	Ref.
Поколение	1992	"Посмотри в глаза"	Best Direction	Won	
