= Adaptations of Mary Poppins =

Adaptations of book series

There have been several adaptations of Mary Poppins. The characters and the novel have been adapted into several forms of media, including film, cartoons, and contemporary fantasy literature.

== Films ==
Film	U.S. release date	Director(s)	Screenwriter(s)	Story by
Mary Poppins	August 27, 1964	Robert Stevenson	Bill Walsh and Don DaGradi	P. L. Travers
Mary Poppins Returns	December 19, 2018	Rob Marshall	David Magee	David Magee, Rob Marshall, and John DeLuca

=== Mary Poppins (1964) ===
Mary Poppins was made into a film based on the first four books in the series by Walt Disney Productions in 1964. According to the 40th anniversary DVD release of the film in 2004, Walt Disney first attempted to purchase the film rights to Mary Poppins from P. L. Travers as early as 1938, but was rebuffed because Travers did not believe a film version of her books would do justice to her creation and did not want an animated cartoon based on it. The books had been a favourite of Disney's daughters when they were children, and he finally succeeded in purchasing the rights in 1961, although Travers demanded and got script approval rights.

The relationship between Travers and Disney is detailed in Mary Poppins She Wrote, a biography of Travers, by Valerie Lawson, published by Aurum Press in the United Kingdom. The relationship is also the subject of the 2013 Disney film Saving Mr. Banks, starring Emma Thompson as Travers and Tom Hanks as Walt Disney.

The process of planning the film and composing the songs took about two years. Songs in the film are by the Sherman Brothers. Mary Poppins is played by British actress Julie Andrews. Disney cast Dick Van Dyke in the key supporting role of Bert, while Banks children were played by Karen Dotrice and Matthew Garber. George and Winifred Banks were played by David Tomlinson and Glynis Johns. The film features a mix of adventures and episodes taken from each of the existing novels, and new events created for it. In notable differences from the original novels, the film does not include the characters John, Barbara, or Annabel Banks, and has Mary Poppins herself characterised as noticeably kinder.

The film received widespread acclaim from critics and audiences, and was nominated for the Academy Award for Best Picture with Julie Andrews winning the Academy Award for Best Actress for her performance as Mary Poppins. The film won an additional four Oscars for Best Original Song ("Chim Chim Cher-ee"), Best Film Editing, Best Visual Effects, and Best Original Score. The movie takes place in the year 1910.

=== Mary Poppins Returns (2018) ===
On 14 September 2015, Disney announced a new Mary Poppins film was to be made, with a new plot and new songs, although in P. L. Travers' final will, another movie version was not to be made according to her wishes. The film is directed by Rob Marshall and written by David Magee. Songs are composed by Marc Shaiman and Scott Wittman, who both received support from Richard Sherman, who, along with his late brother-collaborator Robert Sherman, wrote the iconic song score of the original Mary Poppins film. The film is not a reboot or remake of the original 1964 film; in this film Mary Poppins revisits the now-adult Banks children from the first film and takes charge of the three children of Michael Banks. It is loosely based on the other seven Mary Poppins books by Travers and expands beyond them. Emily Blunt stars as Mary Poppins, alongside Lin-Manuel Miranda in the role of Jack, a similar character to Dick Van Dyke's "Bert" from the first film. It was announced on 31 May 2016 that the film would be titled Mary Poppins Returns and would take place in Great Depression-era London, 25 years after the events of the original film. Emily Mortimer and Ben Whishaw play grown-up Jane and Michael Banks. The release date was December 19, 2018 in the US and the UK.

== Television ==
=== Mary Poppins, Goodbye (1983) ===
In 1983, the story was adapted by the Soviet Union's Mosfilm studios into the Russian-language TV musical film Mary Poppins, Goodbye, starring Natalya Andreychenko (acting) and Tatyana Voronina (singing) as Mary Poppins, Albert Filozov as George Banks, and Oleg Tabakov as Miss Andrew.

== Cast members ==
Character	Mary Poppins	Mary Poppins, Goodbye	Mary Poppins	Mary Poppins	Mary Poppins	Mary Poppins Returns
Character	1964	1983	2004		2006	2018
Mary Poppins	Julie Andrews	Natalya Andrejchenko	Juliet Stevenson	Laura Michelle Kelly	Ashley Brown	Emily Blunt
Bert	Dick Van Dyke			Gavin Lee	Gavin Lee	
Jane Banks	Karen Dotrice	Anna Plisetskaya	Sophie Stuckey	Nicola Bowman; Carrie Fletcher; Poppy Lee Friar; Charlotte Spencer; Faye Spittlehouse	Katherine Doherty; Delaney Moro; Kathryn Faughnan	Emily Mortimer
Michael Banks	Matthew Garber	Filipp Rukavishnikov	Jonathan Bee	Jake Catterall; Perry Millward; Jack Montgomery; Harry Stott; Ben Watton	Matthew Gumley; Henry Hodges; Alexander Scheitinger	Ben Whishaw
George Banks	David Tomlinson	Albert Filozov	David Timson	David Haig	Daniel H. Jenkins	
Winifred Banks	Glynis Johns	Larisa Udovichenko	Deborah Berlin	Linzi Hateley	Rebecca Luker	
Admiral Boom	Reginald Owen	Zinovi Gerdt		Ian Burford	Michael McCarty	David Warner
Miss Lark	Marjorie Bennett	Irina Skobtseva		Claire Machin	Ann Arvia	Sudha Bhuchar
Mrs. Brill	Reta Shaw			Jenny Galloway	Jane Carr	
Ellen	Hermione Baddeley					Julie Walters
Robertson Ay		Lembit Ulfsak		Gerard Carey	Mark Price	
Bird Woman	Jane Darwell			Julia Sutton	Cass Morgan	
Mrs. Corry	Alma Lawton	Marina Nudga	Phyllida Law	Melanie La Barrie	Janelle Anne Robinson	
Bank chairman	Dick Van Dyke (Dawes Sr.)			Ian Murford	Michael McCarty	Colin Firth (William Weatherall Wilkins)
Dawes Jr	Arthur Malet					Dick Van Dyke
Miss Andrew		Oleg Tabakov		Rosemary Ashe	Ruth Gottschall	
Park Keeper		Igor Yasulovich		Kevin Williams	Nick Corley	
Uncle Albert Wigg	Ed Wynn					
Katie Nana	Elsa Lanchester		Phyllida Law	Louisa Shaw	Megan Osterhaus	
Mr. Binnacle	Don Barclay					Jim Norton
Neleus		Viktor Kārkliņš		Stuart Neal	Brian Letendre	
Constable	Arthur Treacher	Eduard Levin		Tim Morgan	James Hindman	
Jack						Lin-Manuel Miranda
Balloon Woman		Cameo				Angela Lansbury
Topsy			Phyllida Law			Meryl Streep
Arthur Turvy			Andrew Sachs			

== Musicals ==
=== Mary Poppins (2004) ===
Author P. L. Travers resisted selling the stage rights to the Mary Poppins stories for many years, as a result of her dislike of the 1964 film version, and her perception of being treated discourteously by Walt Disney at the film's premiere.

After the 1980 Picketwire stage production in La Junta, Colorado, Travers eventually sold the stage rights to London theatre producer Cameron Mackintosh. She acquiesced on the condition (expressed in her will) that only English-born writers – and no Americans, particularly anyone involved with the film production – were to be directly involved in the creative process of the stage musical. Despite her deep-seated antipathy for the film, Travers eventually acquiesced to Mackintosh's insistence that the stage production be allowed to utilize the iconic Sherman Brothers' songs from the 1964 film.

The world premiere of the stage adaptation of Mary Poppins took place at the Bristol Hippodrome in the United Kingdom in September 2004. The production then moved to the Prince Edward Theatre in London's West End on 15 December 2004, where it ran for three years before closing in January 2008. The show transferred to a UK national tour, and a number of international versions were staged, including a long Broadway run in New York City.

== Radio ==
=== The Saturday Play ===
On 31 May 2010 BBC Radio 7 broadcast a one-hour dramatisation combining several of the adventures into one drama, starring Juliet Stevenson as Mary Poppins. This production has been rebroadcast several times on BBC Radio 4 Extra.

== Soundtracks ==
Title	U.S. release date	Length	Composer(s)	Label
Mary Poppins: Original Cast Soundtrack	1964		Irwin Kostal	Buena Vista
Duke Ellington Plays Mary Poppins	1965		Duke Ellington	Reprise
Saving Mr. Banks: Original Motion Picture Soundtrack	December 10, 2013		Thomas Newman	Walt Disney
Mary Poppins Returns: Original Motion Picture Soundtrack	December 7, 2018		Marc Shaiman	Walt Disney

== Anniversary celebrations ==
To celebrate the 100th anniversary of P. L. Travers living in Bowral, an attempt was made to break the world record for the world's largest umbrella mosaic on Bradman Oval, Bowral, at 2:06 pm on 7 May 2011. The event was organised by the Southern Highlands Youth Arts Council. The record was achieved, with 2115 people. An aerial photograph was taken by helicopter.

== 2012 Olympics celebration of British children's literature ==
Mary Poppins featured in a celebration of British children's literature during the opening ceremony of the London 2012 Olympic Games. In a sequence called "Second to the right and straight on till morning", over thirty Mary Poppins descended with umbrellas to fight and defeat the villains Queen of Hearts, Captain Hook, Cruella de Vil, and Lord Voldemort, who were haunting children's dreams.

== Use During the World Tribology Congress 2017 ==
The silhouette of Mary Poppins with an umbrella was used on the cover of the special issue of the journal Friction, dedicated to the 6th World Tribology Congress in Beijing. It shows the process of detachment of an adhesive contact made in the form of a flat punch in the character's shape.

== See also ==
- Mary Poppins, or MAPO (US patent 3,973,746), the moving blocklight system that maintains spacing on Disney World monorail trains
