= Igor Nadzhiev =

Russian composer (born 1967)

Igor Nadzhiev Игорь Наджиев
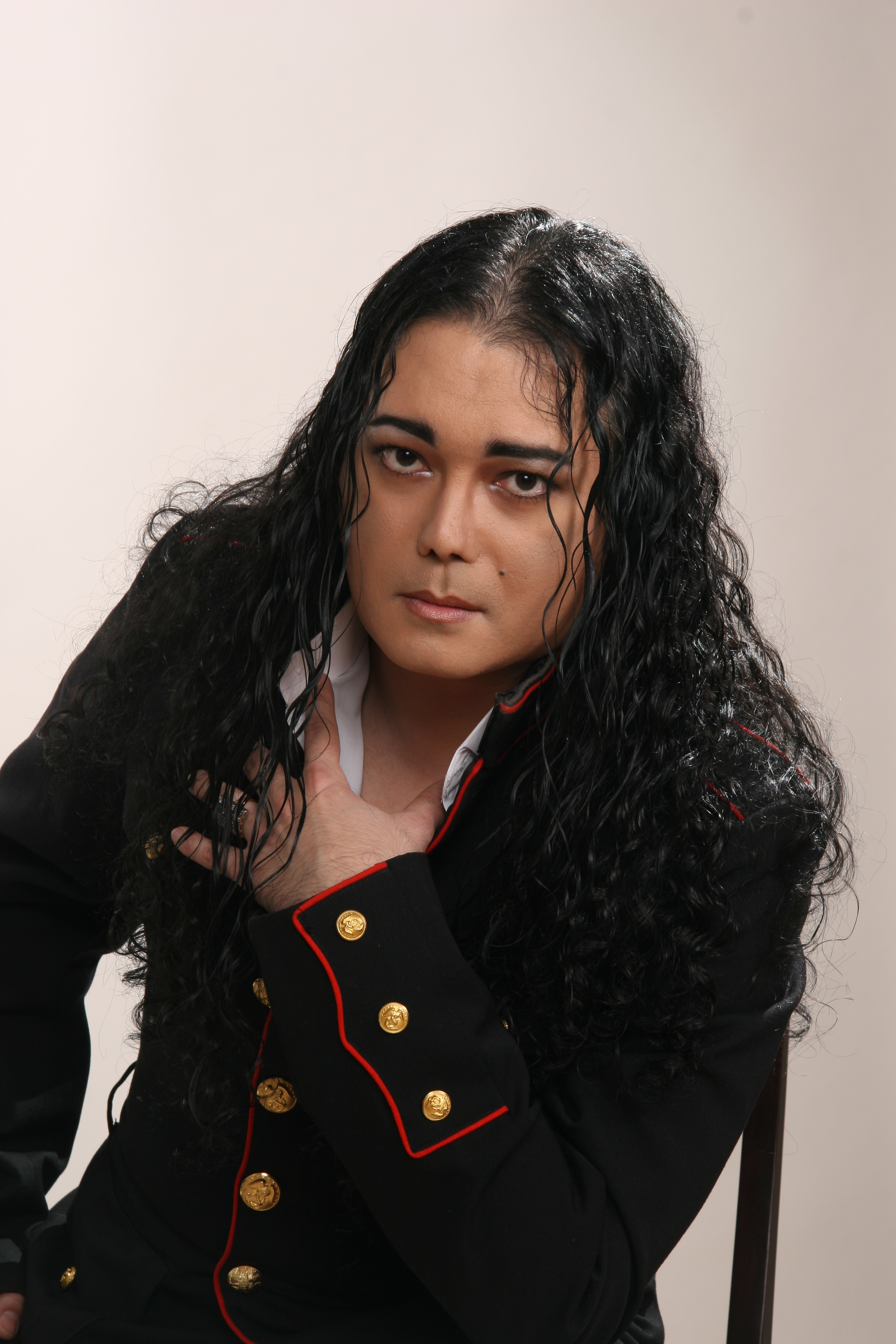

Background information
- Born: Igor Mislyumovich Nadzhiev; 13 November 1967 (age 58); Astrakhan, Soviet Union
- Occupations: singer, songwriter, actor
- Years active: 1986–present
- Website: http://igor-nadjiev.sitecity.ru
- Musical career
- Genres: Pop, dance, pop rock
- Instruments: Vocals

Igor Mislyumovich Nadzhiev (Russian: И́горь Мислю́мович Наджи́ев; born November 13, 1967, Astrakhan) is a Soviet and Russian singer, songwriter, composer, poet and actor. Pesnya Goda Award Winner (1997).

== Biography ==
He was born in Astrakhan. From the age of four he began to study music. In 1983 he entered the conductor-choral department of the Astrakhan Musical College, bearing the name of Modest Mussorgsky.

Since 1986, he has been a pop singer, author of a number of solo programs, including, thanks to Boris Brunov, on the stage of the Moscow State Variety Theatre. The singer connects his formation as an artist with the poet Leonid Derbenyov and the composer Maksim Dunayevsky.

== Discography ==
- 1994 Lost Country (CD)
- 1995 You Come (CD)
- 1997 The Scarlet Flower, Part I of the Royal Album (CD)
- 2000 Clown King, II part of the Royal Album (CD)
- 2004 My Fate is in Your Hands... (CD)
- 2007 Names for All Time. Igor Nadzhiev (CD)
- 2010 I Love You! (CD)
- 2011 Thank You... (MP3)
- 2012 If Only You Were with Me... (CD)
- 2014 Igor Nadzhiev. 20 years Later (DVD)
- 2016 In the Russian Heart... (DVD)
- 2018 God, Save Russia! (CD)

== Selected filmography ==
- White Nights (1992; dir. Leonid Kvinikhidze)
- Baby by November (1992; dir. Aleksandr Pavlovskiy)
- Musketeers Twenty Years After (1992; dir. Georgi Yungvald-Khilkevich)
- The Secret of Queen Anne or Musketeers Thirty Years After (1993; dir. Georgi Yungvald-Khilkevich)
- Russian Amazons (2002; dir. Isaac Friedberg)

== Personal life ==
Wife Alla Nadzhieva-Vorontsova. Has a daughter Olga and a son Igor.

According to the singer himself, he performed seven operations on his nose, the cause of which was an injury received by Nadzhiev at school age.

== Political views ==
In the 1990s, he was a supporter of the Yabloko party; in the 2000 presidential election, he supported Grigory Yavlinsky’s candidacy.

He supported Vladimir Putin’s policy regarding Ukraine and Crimea. Since 2016, he has performed in the DPR and LPR

He released the music video “Russians Will Not Be Afraid” in support of Russia’s invasion of Ukraine. In 2023, he called on the government to prevent artists who left the country from earning money in Russia.
