= Paramonov Mill =

Coordinates: 47°13′13″N 39°44′34″E

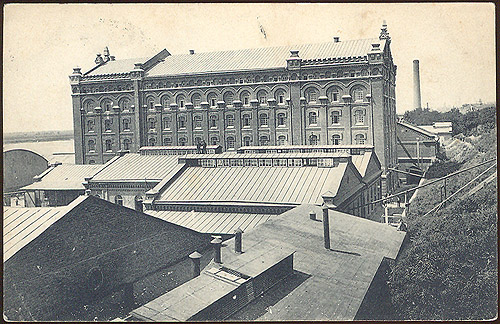
The mill in a pre-1917 photograph

Paramonov Mill (Russian: Парамоновская мельница) was a grain mill in Rostov-on-Don, Russia. Its ruins currently stand on the corner of Beregovaya Street and 7 February Lane (formerly Posokhov Lane). The Russian entrepreneur Yelpidifor Paramonov the mill was owned for a time.

== History ==
Rostov-on-Don, the capital of Russia's southern region, was a major logistics center, due to its location on the Don river. The area was famous for grain production, and dozens of merchants specialized in trading rye and wheat and grain processing. Before the 1917 revolution, many barns, granaries, warehouses and grain mills were on the Don embankment. Merchant Pyotr Fyodorovich Posokhov owned the largest roller mill featuring cutting-edge equipment located at the bottom of Mill Descent. Posokhov's contribution in supplying the city of Rostov and local bakeries with flour was so impressive, that Mill Descent was named after Posokhov in 1888.

In 1889 the mill and its premises was acquired by a new owner – a merchant Yelpidifor Paramonov. Under the new management, the mill was in operation for seven years before being destroyed by a fire in 1896.

== Rebuilding ==
It took Paramonov two years to rebuild the six-storeyed construction destroyed by the fire, and install new equipment

Ye.T. Paramonov was nicknamed "the bread/grain king of Russia", and Rostov-on-Don – "the granary of the Empire". At the heart of the grain empire was the six-storeyed mill on the bank of the Don river. Next to the mill, on Beregovaya Street, Paramonov built warehouses. The location was favorable because steamers could be moored nearby, on the Don river. The warehouses later became known by Paramonov's name, as the Paramonov Warehouses.

After the October Revolution, the mill was nationalized by the Bolsheviks and was "Mill number One of Soyuz Khleb", and later "state-run Mill number One". The mill was in operation until 7 February 1930 when another fire broke out.

== 1930 fire ==
A large explosion occurred during the night shift on 7 February 1930. Flour dust exploded in the production shop and a large fire started. It took several days to put out the fire. The fire was caused by a random spark or a cigarette butt left burning, which caused the flour dust, suspended in the air, to detonate. In the same year, the Mill Descent street name was changed again to "7th February Street".

The building has not been restored and is still in ruins.
