= White Nights (short story) =

1848 short story by Fyodor Dostoevsky

- Short story by Fyodor Dostoevsky
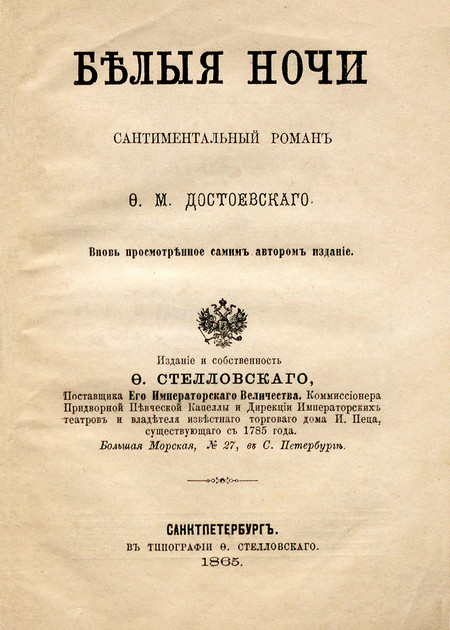
- Cover of the publication in 1865 as part of White Nights and Other Stories

Text available at Wikisource

Text available at Russian Wikisource
- Original title: Белые ночи
- Translator: Constance Garnett
- Country: Russian Empire
- Language: Russian
- Genres: first-person narrative, romance

Publication
- Published in: Otechestvennye Zapiski
- Publication type: Newspaper
- Publication date: 1848
- Published in English: 1918

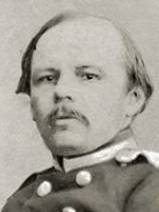
Dostoevsky in the 1850s, a few years after "White Nights."

"White Nights" (Russian: Белые ночи, romanized: Belye nochi; original spelling Бѣлыя ночи, Beliya nochi) is a short story by Fyodor Dostoevsky, originally published in 1848, early in the writer's career.

Like many of Dostoevsky's stories, "White Nights" is told in the first person by a nameless narrator. The narrator is a young man living in Saint Petersburg who suffers from loneliness. He gets to know and falls in love with a young woman, but the love remains unrequited as the woman misses her lover, with whom she is finally reunited.

== Synopsis ==
First Night

The narrator lives alone in a small apartment in Saint Petersburg with only his old maid Matryona to keep him company. While walking, he sees a young woman, Nastenka, (Note: A diminutive of the name Anastasia.) standing against a railing and crying. He considers asking her what is wrong, but continues walking. He then hears her scream, intervenes and saves her from a man who is harassing her.

Nastenka holds his hand, but he has never known a woman and feels timid with her. Nastenka reassures him that ladies like timidity and that she likes it, too. He tells her that he spends every minute of every day dreaming about a girl who would talk to him, who will not repulse him or ridicule him. He says that he thinks of talking to a random girl timidly, respectfully, passionately – telling her that he is dying in solitude and that he has no chance of success with her. He says that it is a girl's duty not to rudely reject or mock a man as timid and luckless as he. As they reach Nastenka's door, he asks if he will ever see her again. Before she can answer, he adds that he will be at the spot they met tomorrow anyway just so he can relive this one happy moment in his lonely life. She agrees, stating she cannot tell him not to come, and she has to be there anyway. Nastenka would tell him her story and be with him, provided that talking does not lead to romance. She is as lonely as the narrator.

Second Night

On their second meeting, Nastenka seeks to find out more about him. He tells her that he has spent his life utterly alone. He talks about his longing for companionship, (Note: In a style that anticipates that of the Underground Man in Notes from Underground.) and begins to tell his story in third person, calling himself "the hero". This "hero" is happy at the hour when all work ends and people walk about. He dreams of everything, from befriending poets to having a place in the winter with a girl by his side. He says that the dreariness of everyday life kills people, while in his dreams he can make his life as he wishes it to be. Nastenka sympathetically assures him that she will be his friend.

Nastenka's History

Nastenka then tells her story. She grew up with a strict and blind grandmother, who gave Nastenka a sheltered upbringing. Nastenka's grandmother uses a safety pin to keep the two joined at the hip, as she fears her granddaughter will get into mischief. Her grandmother's pension being too small, they rent a room in their house. When their first lodger dies, the grandmother rents to a younger man. Despite embarrassing herself in front of him by revealing that she is literally and figuratively pinned to her grandmother, the young man begins a silent courtship with Nastenka, giving her books so that she may develop a reading habit. The young man invites Nastenka and her grandmother to a performance of a play. (Note: The Barber of Seville.) On the night that the young lodger is about to leave Petersburg for Moscow, Nastenka urges him to marry her. He refuses immediate marriage and claims that he does not have money to support them but assures her that he will return for her a year later. Nastenka finishes her story and notes that a year has gone, and he has not sent her a single letter.

Third Night

The narrator gradually realizes that despite his assurance that their friendship will remain platonic, he has inevitably fallen in love with her. He nevertheless helps her by writing and posting a letter to her lover, and he conceals his feelings for her. They await his reply to the letter or his appearance, but Nastenka grows restless at the other man's absence and takes comfort in the narrator's friendship. Unaware of the depth of the narrator's feelings for her, she says that she loves him because he has not fallen in love with her. The narrator starts despairing of his unrequited love.

Fourth Night

Nastenka despairs because she knows that her lover is in Petersburg but has not contacted her. The narrator continues to comfort her and eventually confess his love for her. Nastenka is disoriented at first, and the narrator, realizing that they can no longer continue to be friends in the same manner, insists on never seeing her again. She urges him to stay, and suggests that their relationship might become romantic some day, but that she wants his friendship in her life. The narrator becomes hopeful at this prospect. While walking, they pass by Nastenka's lover who stops and calls after them. She jumps into his arms. She returns briefly to kiss the narrator but journeys into the night, leaving him alone and broken-hearted.

Morning

The narrator receives a letter from Nastenka, in which she apologizes for hurting him and insists that she will always be thankful for his companionship. She says that she will be married within a week and hopes that he will come. While reading the letter, the narrator breaks into tears. Matryona interrupts his thoughts by announcing that she has finished cleaning the cobwebs. The narrator notes that though he had never considered Matryona to be old, she looked far older than she ever had, and wonders if his own future is to be without companionship and love. He refuses to despair:

"But that I should feel any resentment against you, Nastenka! That I should cast a dark shadow over your bright, serene happiness! ...That I should crush a single one of those delicate blooms which you will wear in your dark hair when you walk up the aisle to the altar with him! Oh no — never, never! May your sky be always clear, may your dear smile be always bright and happy, and may you be for ever blessed for that moment of bliss and happiness which you gave to another lonely and grateful heart ... Good Lord, only a moment of bliss? Isn't such a moment sufficient for the whole of a man's life?"

== Film adaptations ==
- Le notti bianche, a 1957 Italian film by Luchino Visconti
- White Nights, a 1959 Russian film by Ivan Pyryev
- Four Nights of a Dreamer, a 1971 French film by Robert Bresson
- White Nights, a 1992 Russian film by Leonid Kvinikhidze
- White Nights, a 2003 Iranian film, directed by Farzad Motamen
- Iyarkai, a 2003 Indian Tamil film, directed by S.P. Jananathan as his directorial debut
- White Nights, a 2005 American film by Alain Silver
- Saawariya, a 2007 Hindi film, directed by Sanjay Leela Bhansali

The 2008 American film Two Lovers, though not an adaptation, was inspired by "White Nights".

== Bibliography ==
- "White Nights". The Best Stories of Fyodor Dostoevsky. Translated by David Magarshack. New York City: The Modern Library. 2005 [1848]. ISBN 9780345481269.
