= Lyubov Voropayeva =

Russian writer (born 1952)

- Born: Lyubov Grigorievna Voropayeva; 16 September 1952 (age 73); Moscow, RSFSR, USSR
- Education: Moscow State Linguistic University
- Occupations: Poet songwriter producer

Lyubov Grigorievna Voropayeva (Russian: Любовь Григорьевна Воропаева; born 16 September 1952) is a Soviet and Russian poet, songwriter, screenwriter, producer, laureate of the Song of the Year TV festival.

== Career ==
Voropaeva graduated from the Maurice Thorez Moscow State Pedagogical Institute of Foreign Languages.

Since the beginning of the 1990s, Lyubov Voropayeva began producing activities together with her husband, composer Viktor Dorokhin.

Voropaeva and Dorokhin owe their creative rise to Zhenya Belousov, Barbie and other performers.

In 1994, together with her husband, she organized the Russian Association of Music Producers (RAMP).

Lyubov continues to independently engage in producing activities in pop music, she is the author of more than 500 shows and presentations in the largest entertainment complexes in Moscow, the scriptwriter and producer of numerous television and radio shows.

She is a well-known poet, author of three books of poetry and more than 1000 publications in periodicals, poetry almanacs and collections, author of texts for more than 200 hits in pop and rock music.

== Selected songs ==
- Portrait of A Woman (music by Viktor Dorokhin) performed by Valery Leontyev
- New Year's Gifts (music by Viktor Dorokhin) performed by Aleksandr Abdulov
- Extra Ticket (music by Sergey Ukhnalev) performed by Ekaterina Semyonova
- My Blue-Eyed Girl (music by Viktor Dorokhin) performed by Zhenya Belousov
- For a Minute (music by Viktor Dorokhin) performed by Ekaterina Semyonova
- Alushta (music by Viktor Dorokhin) performed by Zhenya Belousov
- The Last Tango (music by Viktor Dorokhin) performed by Ekaterina Semyonova
- Night Taxi (music by Viktor Dorokhin) by performed by Zhenya Belousov
- The Man Who Hurries (music Viktor Dorokhin) performed by Ekaterina Semyonova
- Come what May (music by Viktor Dorokhin) performed by Ksenia Georgiadi
- Golden Domes (music by Viktor Dorokhin) performed by Zhenya Belousov
- Polite (music by Lora Quint) performed by Mikhail Shufutinsky
- Learn to Laugh (music by Vladimir Ermolin) performed by Mikhail Boyarsky
- Love Has Your Eyes (music by Ilya Chugaev) performed by Ivan Lovi
- Clock with a Secret (music by Viktor Dorokhin) performed by Barbie
- The Best Woman (music by Viktor Dorokhin) performed by Igor Nadzhiev
- Two Women Were Sitting by the Fire (music by Viktor Dorokhin) performed by Roksana Babayan
