= White Nights (1992 film) =

- Russian: Белые ночи
- Directed by: Leonid Kvinikhidze
- Written by: Fyodor Dostoevsky (novel); Vladimir Valutsky
- Produced by: Alexander Golutva
- Starring: Vadim Lyubshin; Anna Matyukhina; Nikolai Yeremenko Jr.
- Cinematography: Eduard Rozovsky
- Music by: Maksim Dunayevsky
- Production company: Lenfilm
- Release date: 1992
- Running time: 92 min.
- Country: Russia
- Language: Russian

White Nights (Russian: Белые ночи, romanized: Belye nochi) is a 1992 Russian film directed by Leonid Kvinikhidze based on the novel of the same name by Fyodor Dostoyevsky. The events of the picture are moved to the present day, the 1990s.

== Cast ==
- Vadim Lyubshin as Mitya
- Anna Matyukhina as Nastya
- Nikolai Yeremenko Jr. as tenant
- Galina Polskikh as Nastya's aunt
- Vitaly Usanov as Redhead
- Igor Nadzhiev as singer
- Pavel Kornakov as episode

== Critical response ==
Leonid Kvinikhidze's film is one of the best roles of Galina Polskikh according to Film.ru.

According to Russian film critic Mikhail Trofimenkov, this film adaptation was unsuccessful.

- Alexander Fedorov: Screening the story of Fyodor Dostoevsky White Nights, Leonid Kvinikhidze transferred its action to St. Petersburg in the early 90s of the twentieth century. In theory, additional meanings, unexpected parallels should have arisen, the original author's vision of the material should have appeared. In my opinion, this did not happen. Acting does not go beyond the scope of an ordinary melodrama, and the philosophy of the great Russian classic has dissolved in a banal and instructive modernized plot.

== Literature ==
- Alexander Burry, Frederick White (2016). Border Crossing: Russian Literature into Film. SC: Edinburgh University Press. p. 61. ISBN 9781474418454.
