= Mary Poppins =

Mary Poppins may refer to:

- Mary Poppins (character), a nanny with magical powers
- Mary Poppins (franchise), based on the fictional nanny
  - Mary Poppins (book series), the original 1934–1988 children's fantasy novels that introduced the character
  - Mary Poppins (film), a 1964 Disney film starring Julie Andrews, based on the books.
    - Mary Poppins: Original Cast Soundtrack, the soundtrack album for the 1964 film.
    - Mary Poppins Returns, a 2018 sequel to the 1964 film.
      - Mary Poppins Returns: Original Motion Picture Soundtrack, the soundtrack album for the 2018 film.
  - Mary Poppins (musical), a 2004 British stage musical based on the books and film.
  - Mary Poppins, Goodbye, a 1984 Soviet TV miniseries featuring Natalya Andreychenko (singing dubbed over by Tatyana Voronina) as the titular nanny.

== See also ==
- Mary Poppins, or MAPO (US patent 3,973,746), the moving blocklight system that maintains spacing on Disney World monorail trains
