= Mary Poppins 2 =

Mary Poppins 2 may refer to:

- Mary Poppins Comes Back (1935 novel) children's novel by P. L. Travers, second book in the Mary Poppins novel series
- Mary Poppins Returns (2018 film), children's musical film by Walt Disney Studios, second film in the Mary Poppins film series

== See also ==
- Mary Poppins (disambiguation)
