= Moabite Notebook =

1968 Soviet film

- Russian: Моабитская тетрадь
- Directed by: Leonid Kvinikhidze
- Written by: Edgar Dubrovsky; Vladimir Grigorev; Sergei Potepalov
- Starring: Rafkat Bikchentayev; Aivars Bogdanovics; Pyotr Chernov; Ildar Khairulin; Khavza Mingashudinova
- Cinematography: Vyacheslav Fastovich
- Music by: Vladislav Uspenskiy
- Release date: 1968
- Running time: 93 minute
- Country: Soviet Union
- Language: Russian

Moabite Notebook (Russian: Моабитская тетрадь) is a 1968 Soviet biographical war film directed by Leonid Kvinikhidze.

== Plot ==
The film tells about the famous Tatar poet Musa Cälil, who ended up in the fascist prison of Moabit, where he wrote over 100 verses.

== Cast ==
- Rafkat Bikchentayev as Shafi
- Aivars Bogdanovics as Timmermans (as Ayvars Bogdanovich)
- Pyotr Chernov as Musa Cälil
- Ildar Khairulin as Zayni
- Khavza Mingashudinova as Idrisi
- Laimonas Noreika as Rosenberg
- Azgar Shakirov as Abdulla Aliş
