= Paramonov Warehouses =

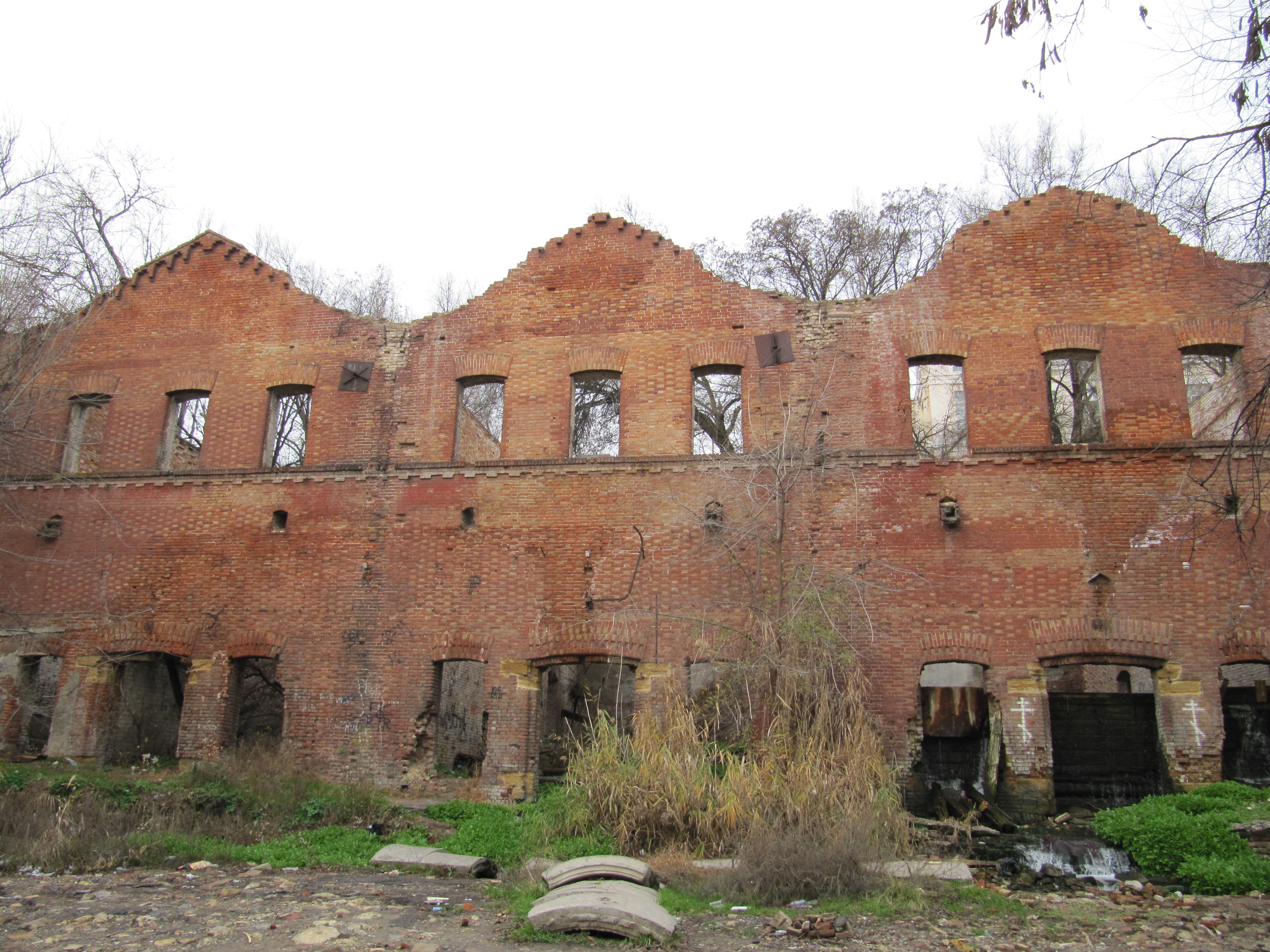
- Interactive map of Paramonov Warehouses
- Location: Rostov-on-Don, Rostov Oblast, Russia
- Coordinates: 47°13′05″N 39°43′36″E

The Paramonov Warehouses (Russian: Парамоновские склады) was a nineteenth century complex of storage facilities in Rostov-on-Don. The ruins of the buildings are located on the banks of the Don River between Sokolova Avenue and Universitetskaya Alley. The remains are listed as a monument of federal importance.

== History ==
The oldest surviving building of the Paramonov Warehouses was built in the middle of the 19th century, and the most recent dates the end of the 1890s. The warehouses were built by engineers Yakunin and E. Shulman. During their operational lifetime the warehouses belonged to various owners and companies, but are now commonly associated with the grain-industrialist Yelpifidor Paramonov.

The warehouses escaped destruction during the bombardments of the port of Rostov-on-Don during the Great Patriotic War. One aerial bomb hit the complex, breaking the water-cooling system. Much of the damage to the warehouses came after their abandonment. Over their working existence the warehouses survived at least five fires. During the last days of the USSR the warehouses were used to store cement and building materials.

In 1985 the Paramonov Warehouses were assigned the status of a historical and cultural monument of local importance. Later the historical monument acquired status of a monument of federal importance.

== Architectural features ==
The warehouses incorporated laconic brick décor with motives of Romanesque and Classical architecture.

Engineers Yakunin and E. Shulman used springs from the Don River's coastal slope, which flowed all year. The water was collected in chutes and channelled through the storage facilities. The temperature of the spring water flowing through the warehouses was a constant +9 °C during the winter and the summer. This maintained reduced temperature in the warehouses, which was conducive for storing grains.

Round apertures remain in the interfloor spaces on the front of the warehouses. They were used to move grain through tarpaulin sleeves from the second floors of the warehouses to the embankment level. From there grains would be transhipped to barges for export.

== Current state ==
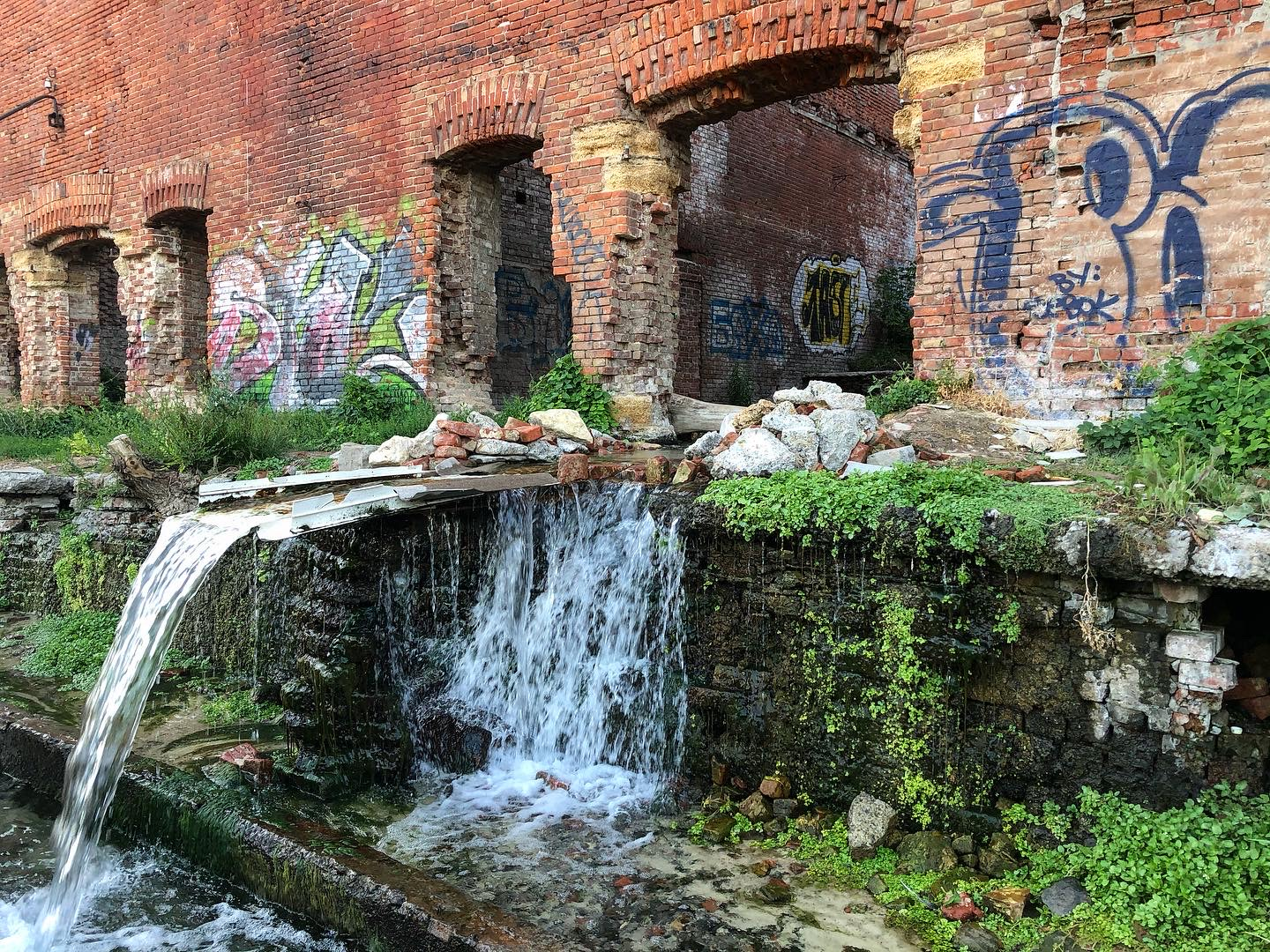
Spring water flowing through the ruins

All of the warehouses are currently in ruins, and exposed to spring water from the Don River's coastal slopes. Because of the constant temperature, the ruins have their own microclimate: grass grows there almost all year.

In June 2011, a local enthusiasts' initiative carried out a litter cleaning activity dubbed "Augean stables" on the Paramonov Warehouses. The Legislative Assembly of Rostov Oblast did not support the activity, considering this work illegal, but pop singer Natalya Vetlitskaya supported it.

The dumping of litter and domestic waste on the grounds of the warehouses has continued. In June 2012, the Kirovsky District court of Rostov-on-Don satisfied the regional Assistant Attourney's plaint to the district ministry of culture and several other organisations, in which Assistant Attourney requested the development of a project to create protection zones for the monument of cultural legacy "The Paramonov Warehouses" and to place informational signs on the grounds. The Ministry of Culture of Rostov Oblast tried to appeal this decision, but in August 2012 the full court of civil affairs of the Rostov Oblast court left the appeal without satisfaction.

In December 2013, the Ministry of Property of Rostov Oblast approved the project of development and reconstruction of the Paramonov Warehouses. The project of reconstruction was developed by one of the Moscow architect bureaus. According to this project, during the reconstruction of the Paramonov Warehouses all buildings will be retained and a centre of contemporary art will be opened in the grounds.

On 23 December 2015 news was leaked that the Paramonov Warehouses might be completely demolished and then rebuilt. In doing so, the new complex would lose its natural basin. This was announced by the head of city administration Sergey Gorban during the regional organizing committee's meeting on the preparations for the 2018 FIFA World Cup: "Conducted expertise showed that all building are in alarming condition and are liable for dismantling and reconstruction. Herewith the basin preservation is not planned".

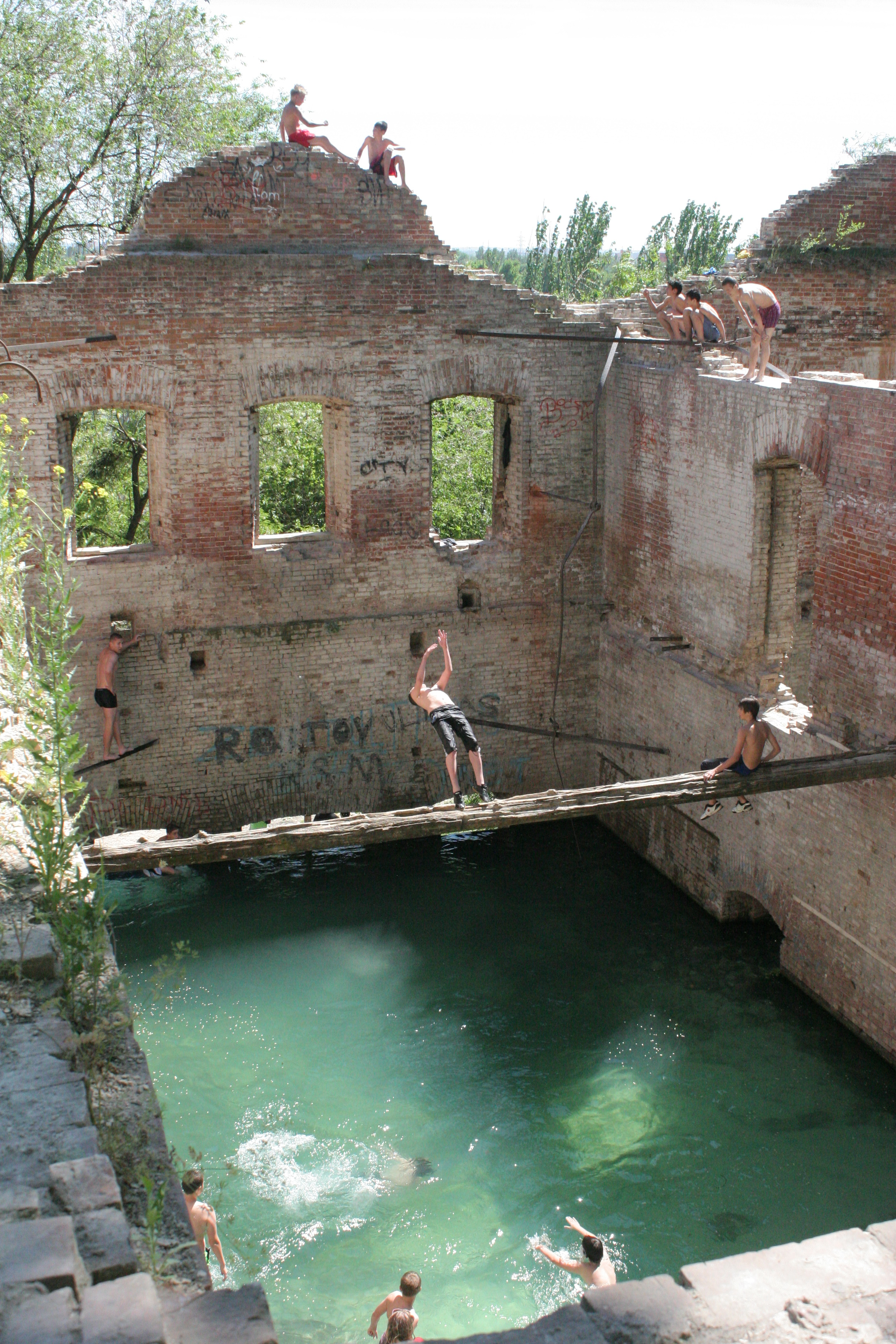
Internal basin within the ruins, which was used by residents

Reconstruction of storage facilities was conducted by PVT "Alliance-M". An agreement for a lease for a period of 45 years between the company and the owner of the Paramonov Warehouses was concluded in the end of 2013. The total of planned investments is 1 billion 240 million rubles.

The auction for sale of the Paramonov Warehouses was set for 31 July 2017, with a starting price of 8.8 million rubles, comparable to the cost of a one-room flat in Moscow.

== In cinema ==
- 2010 – O, Sortie!, documentary. Directed by Rufat Gasanov. VGIK studio.
- 2016 – on 16 January 2016 the warehouses hosted a preview of the film Mr. Junkman (directed by Nikolai Lebedev, produced by Sergey Viktorovich Pimenov).
