= Friend (1987 film) =

- Directed by: Leonid Kvinikhidze
- Written by: Eduard Akopov
- Starring: Sergey Shakurov; Vasily Livanov
- Cinematography: Yegeny Guslinsky
- Music by: Alexander Rosenbaum
- Release date: 1987
- Running time: 83 min
- Country: Soviet Union
- Language: Russian

Friend (Russian: Друг, romanized: Drug) is a 1987 Soviet drama film directed by Leonid Kvinikhidze. The film tells the story of the friendship between a binge drinker (Sergey Shakurov) and a talking dog which understands what it means to be a real person better than humans and tries to help the man become whole again.

== Plot ==
Kolyun, a binge drinker, walks about the local bird market and begs for money, which he allegedly lacks in order to buy an animal for a sick child. He is observed by a man (Anatoly Romashin) with a dog, he asks Kolyun aside and says that he will give him the dog, and even pay for it. Kolyun agrees. The man touchingly bids farewell to the dog. Kolyun returns to work in dry cleaning, ties the dog at the entrance and sends his drinking companion away for vodka. But the vigilant boss (Galina Polskikh) does not allow them to drink. Kolyun makes a scandal. The boss threatens to send him to rehab. On the way home Kolyun buys himself a drink, but the dog drops the bottles from the stairs, and then additionally to this it starts to talk. The dog calls himself Friend. He tries to wake up a normal person in Kolyun, to convince him that drinking is no longer necessary. However, Kolyun does not pay attention to Friend at first, he just wonders how it manages to talk to him without opening its mouth and imagines it to be an imp. Nevertheless, he forces Kolyun to engage in fitness, make morning jogs, stop drinking. Willy-nilly Kolyun slowly ceases to indulge in alcohol. He becomes close with Friend, talks with him, although there are often disagreements between them. Kolyun tells Friend about his past. We learn that Kolyun was an intelligent man, played the accordion, achieved great successes in this area recognized by foreign experts, was married, has a seven-year-old daughter who lives with her mother who is still young and beautiful, albeit blind. Kolyun decides to meet with his daughter. However, this attempt ends unsuccessfully: Kolyun meets with his daughter, confesses that he is her father. The girl is frightened and calls her mother, and Kolyun runs away.

One morning Kolyun's friend Mitka comes in the company of mercenaries. In the early days of knowing Friend, Kolyun wrote two letters to Mitka, in the first reporting the situation and in the second - asking for help. Although Friend begs Kolyun not to open the door, he opens and filled with pity for the dog, asks Mitka to deal with the dog "easier so that it does not feel pain. Kolyun, having been given the commission, gets driven out of his apartment.

Two orderlies enter Kolyun's apartment and see him completely drunk, in a fit of DTs. Black and white scenes. Rehab. After a while Kolyun returns home. He is walking along the street sluggishly, like in a fog. Going into his apartment, Kolyun opens the windows, sits on the curb and clasps the ball in his hands which he previously gifted to Friend. Kolyun cries. The door to his apartment opens, Friend enters wagging his tail and goes to his owner. Freeze-frame.

== Cast ==
- Sergey Shakurov as Nikolay Nikitin, Kolyun
- Newfoundland Yutgay as Friend (voiced by Vasily Livanov)
- Anatoli Romashin as Friend's owner
- Viktor Uralsky as Mitka, Kolyun's drinking companion
- Galina Polskikh as Eleonora Frantsevna, head manager of cleaner's
- Igor Yasulovich as Andreich, Kolyun's neighbour
- Yelena Solovey as Woman with a dog

== Awards ==
Sergey Shakurov received the prize for Best Male Actor at the All-Union Film Festival.
