= Tatyana Voronina =

Russian composer (born 1959)

Tatyana Viktorovna Voronina (Russian: Татьяна Викторовна Воронина; born March 5, 1959, Moscow, RSFSR, Soviet Union) is a Soviet and Russian, pianist, singer and composer. She became known for her sad song about the barber in the film Mary Poppins, Goodbye!.

Voronina was a lesser known singer that made her vocal appearance in the film Mary Poppins, Goodbye! singing for Natalya Andrejchenko. According to a tale she received that job by accident when she was invited for try-outs by Dunayevsky.

Voronina did not continue with professional singing or movie careers, but instead moved to the Martemyanov village of the Don region where she sings and composes music to the words of Archbishop John of San Francisco. Voronina also sings in the church of her husband Vladimir Voronin, the priest.

== See also ==
- Mary Poppins, Goodbye!
