= Don Embankment =

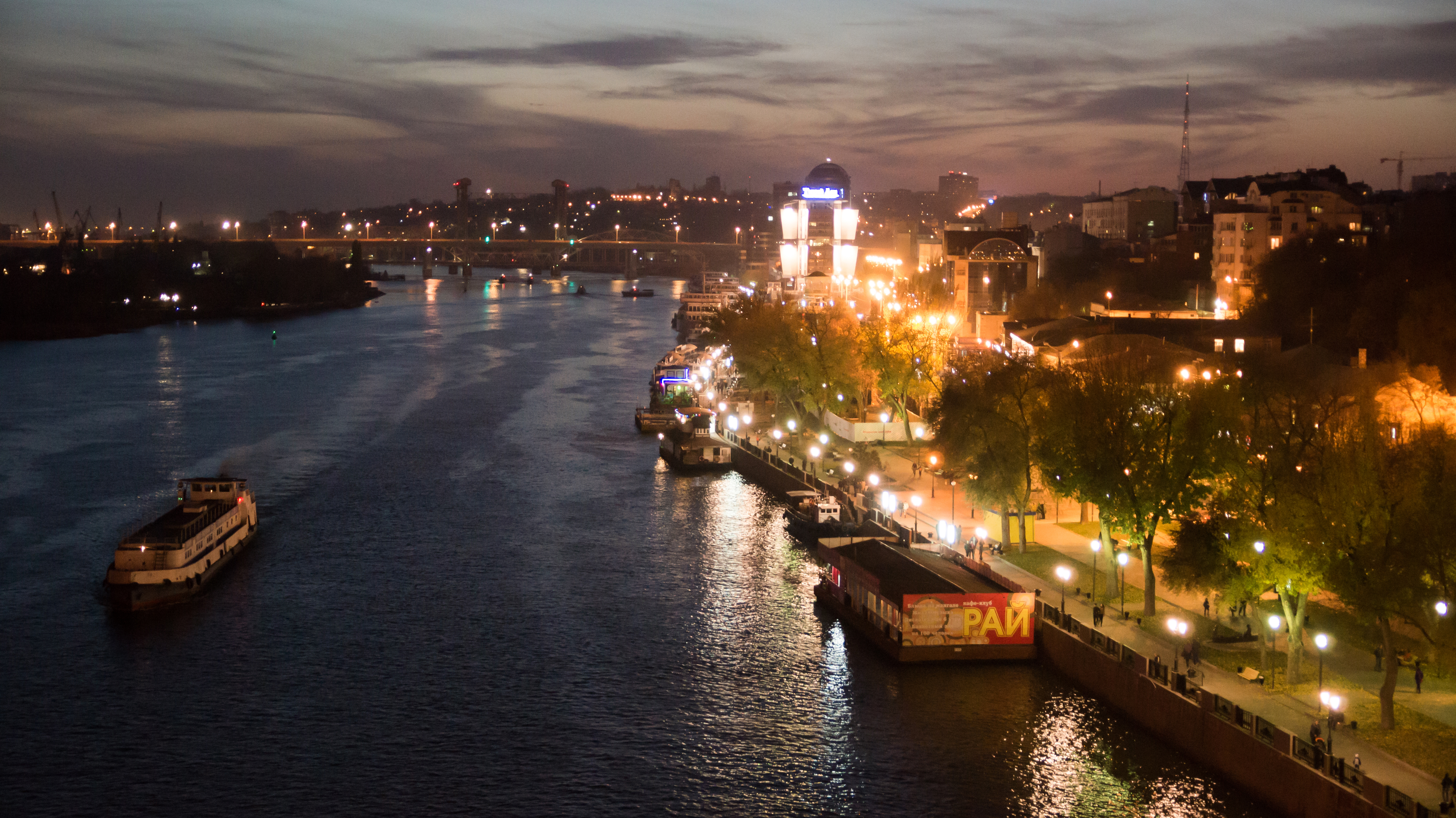
- Native name: Набережная реки Дон (Russian)
- Location: Rostov-on-Don, Russia
- Coordinates: 47°13′03″N 39°43′39″E

Don Embankment (Russian: Набережная реки Дон) in Rostov-on-Don is situated on the right side of the river.

== History ==
In the 1860s in Rostov was formed a street called Beregovaya (Coastal Street) which soon began to be intensively built up. Because of frequent fires, in 1873 the City Duma prohibited building wooden houses there. It was allowed to build only brick buildings with a roof made of iron.

The narrow Beregovaya Street eventually had expanded to the shore, where an embankment was built by 1881.

In 1834 the first construction project of Rostov-on-Don Embankment was proposed by military engineer Lieutenant-Colonel Shmelyov, but this project wasn't completed. In 1842, another draft by Captain Baron Firks was proposed, according to which the embankment was to be extended to 924 meters. Yet again no construction works had been carried out then. In the years 1895–1905, a cargo embankment was built in the city with a pier, running water and electricity lighting. It had huge stone buildings of grain barns, warehouses, customs house, stock exchanges for fish trade and so on. There were steamship piers of passenger and cargo traffic, grain warehouses. So far, five buildings, known as the Paramonov Warehouses, which have the status of a monument of history and culture of federal significance.

Already in Soviet times, in 1944, architect Vladimir Sokolov proposed a project of reconstruction of the embankment, which was implemented. The railway tracks and warehouses were removed from the embankment, and the cranes were moved upstream along the Don. The embankment began to turn into a recreation area. Boulevards and flower gardens were opened there. Works on the improvement of the embankment were conducted under the guidance of the architects Valentin Razumovsky and Jan Rebayn. The opening of the reconstructed Rostov Embankment took place on 7 August 1949.

In 2010s several sculptures and monuments were installed at the embankment. Every year it also hosts the Don River Festival, which is visited by approximately ten thousand people.

== Gallery ==
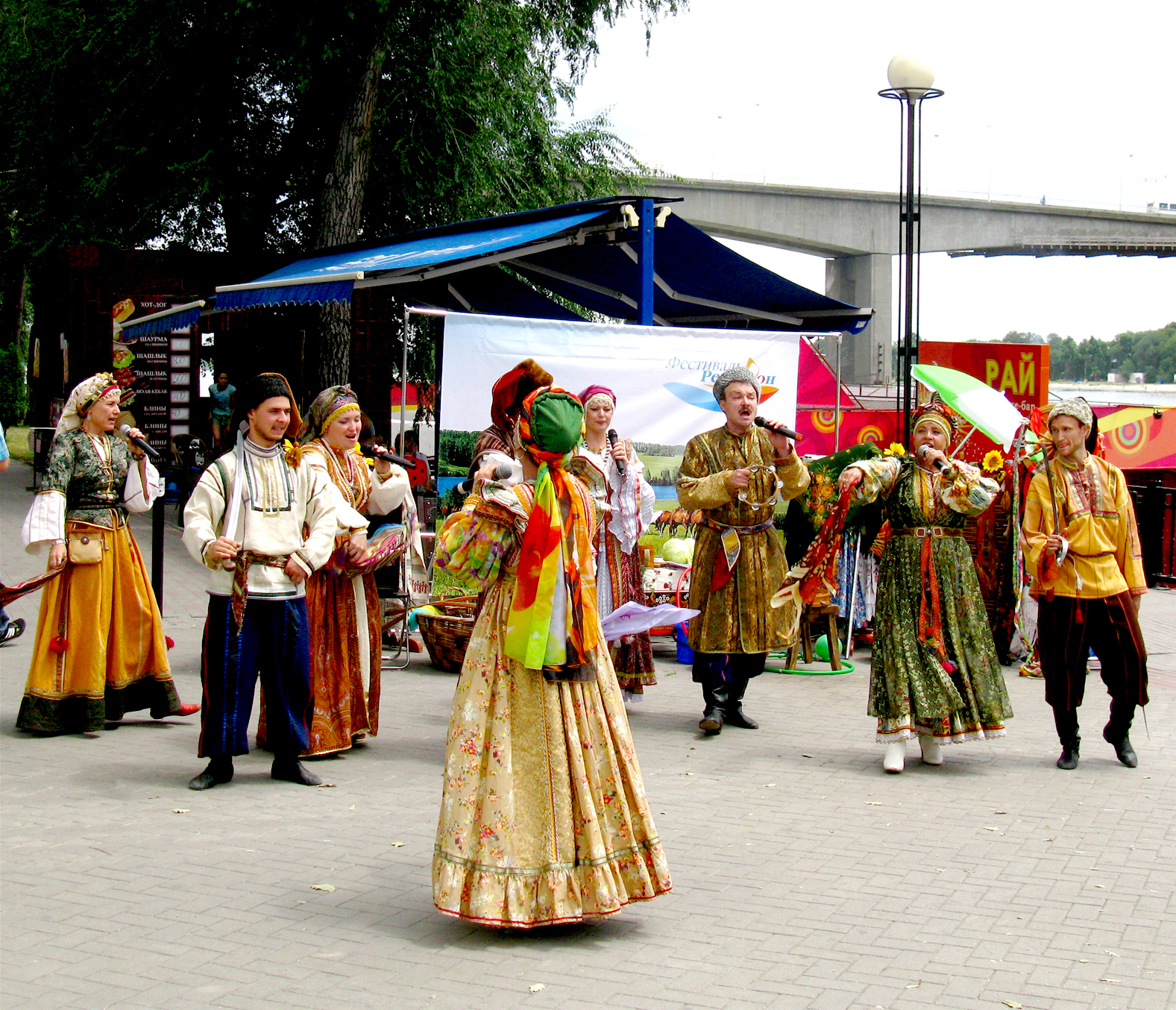
Cossacks at Don River Festival

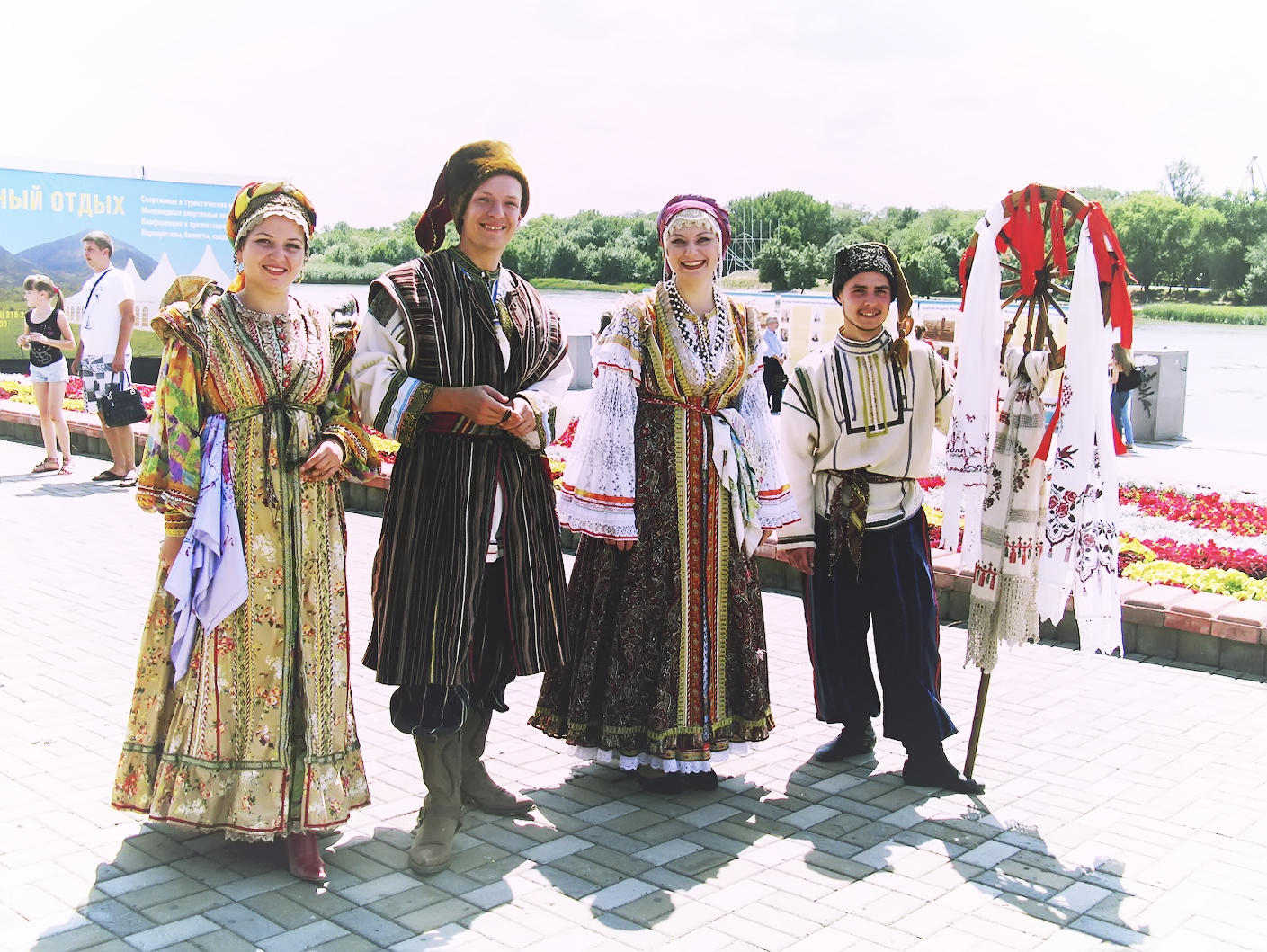
Cossacks at Don River Festival

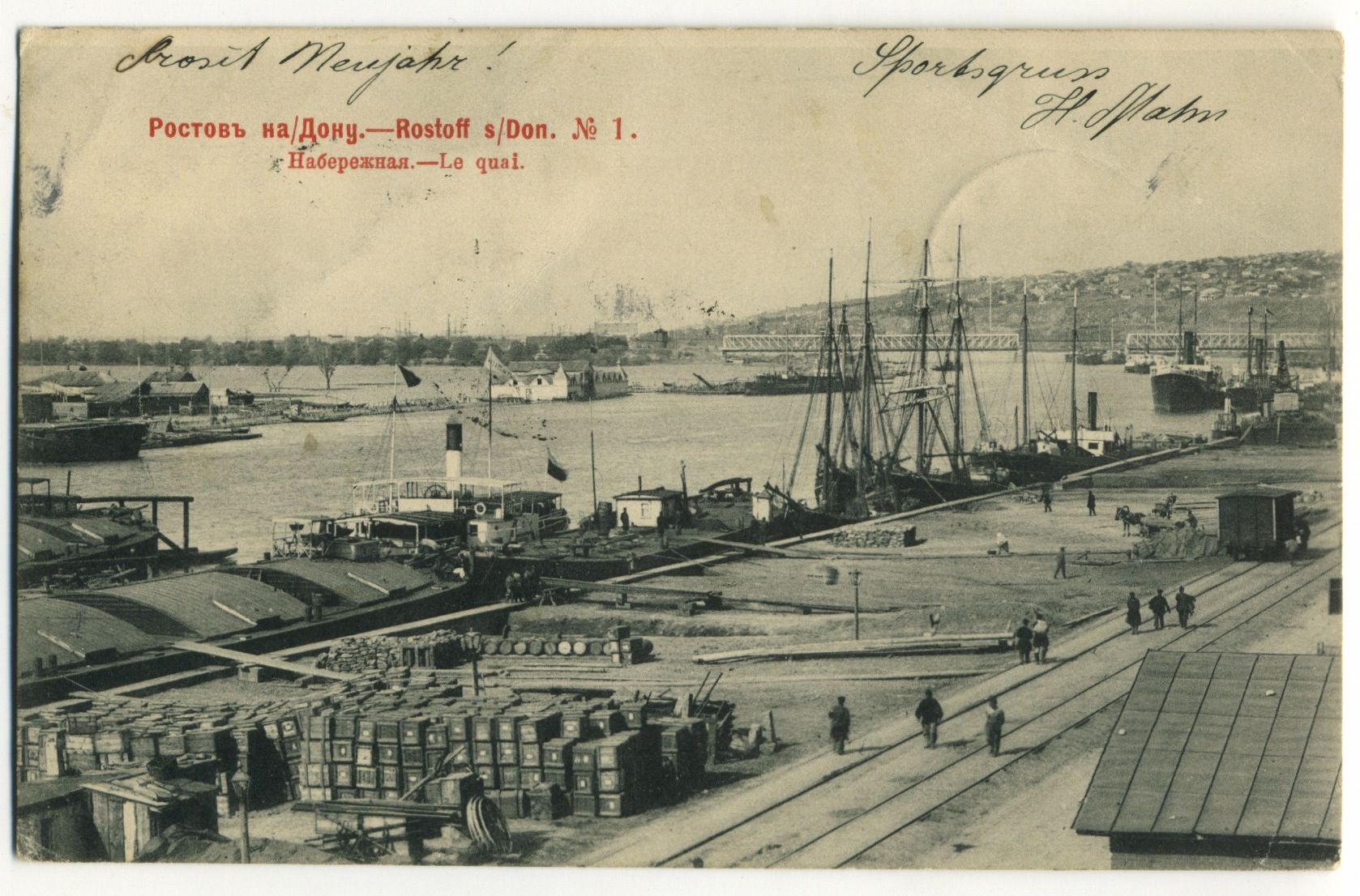
Rostov Embankment

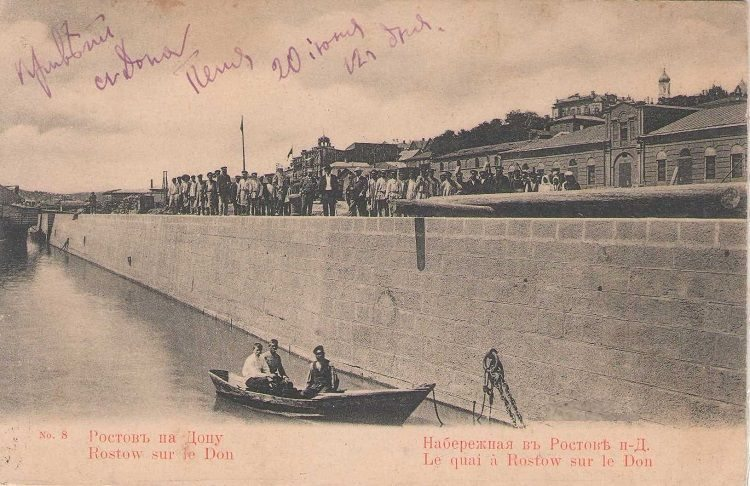
Rostov Embankment

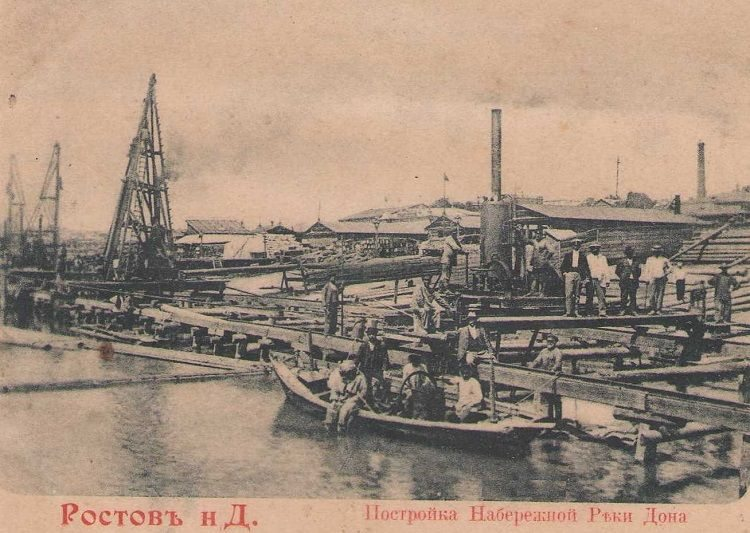
Construction of Rostov Embankment

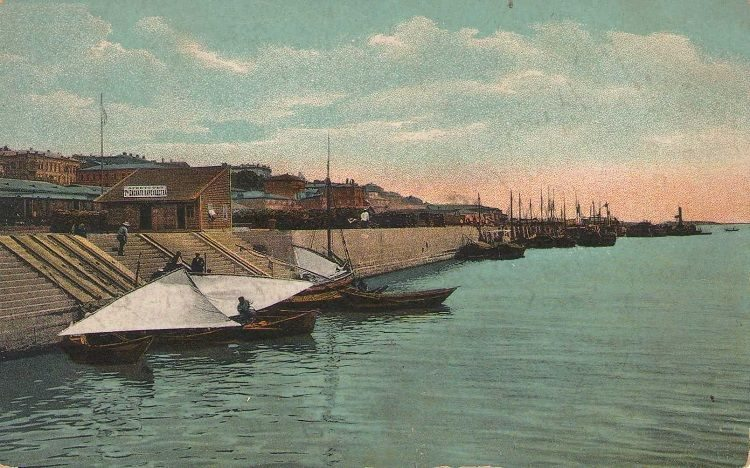
Rostov Embankment before Revolution of 1917

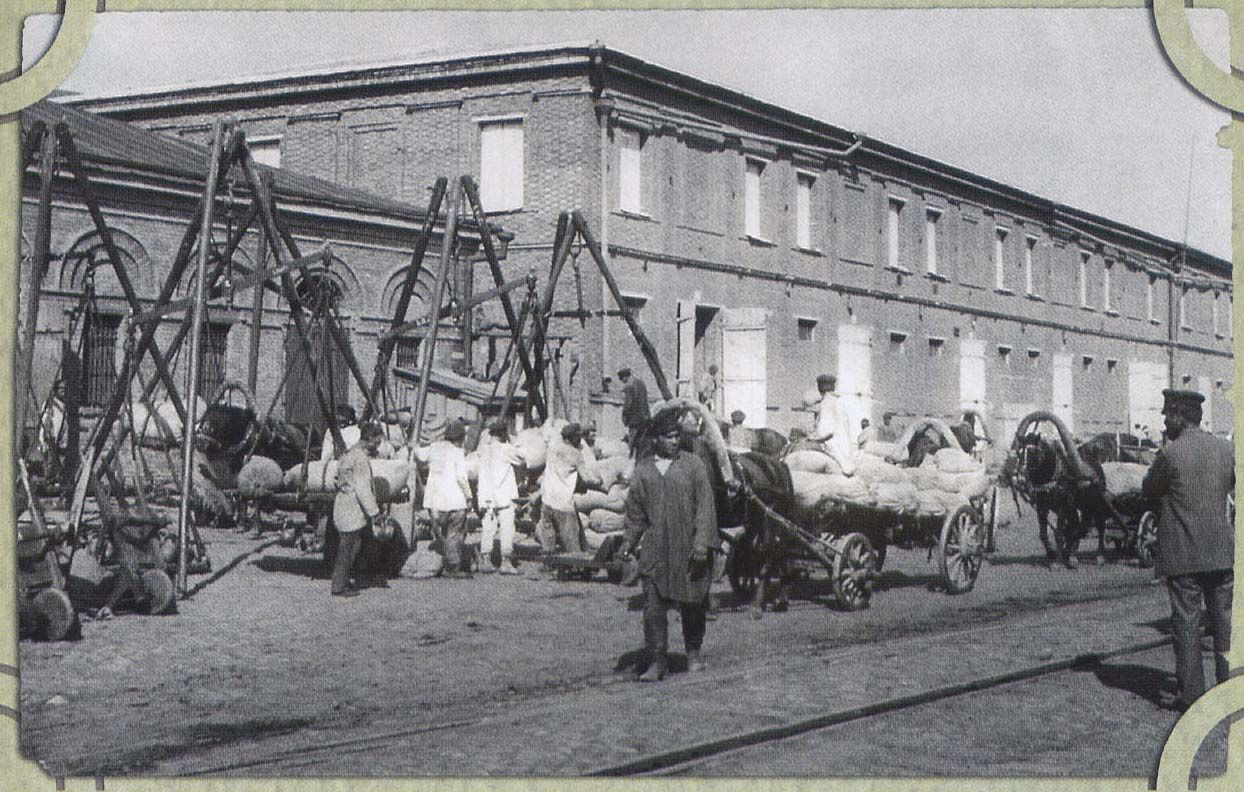
Paramonov Warehouses

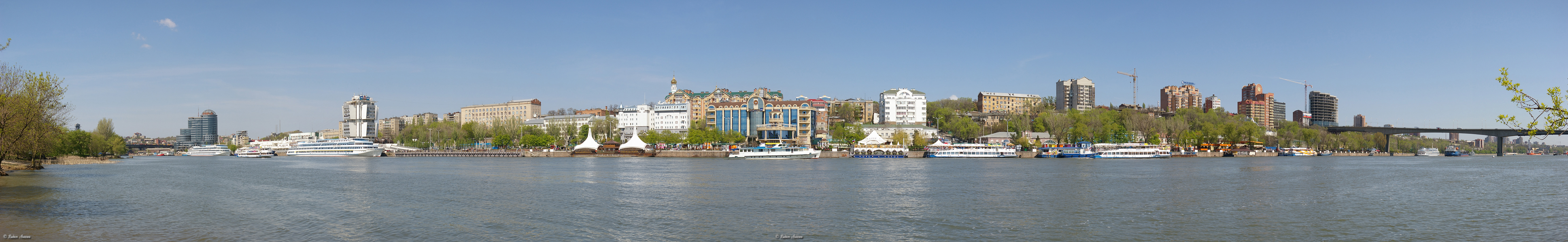
Panorama of the embankment
