= Michael McCarty =

American actor

- Born: September 7, 1946; Evansville, Indiana, U.S.
- Died: September 26, 2014 (aged 68); Santa Barbara, California, U.S.
- Occupation: Actor
- Years active: 1975–2014
- Spouse: Jane Seaman

Michael McCarty (September 7, 1946 – September 26, 2014) was an American movie, television, and stage actor. He was known for his roles in Casper (1995), Dead Man (1995), and in The Legend of Bagger Vance (2000). He was born in Evansville, Indiana.

On Broadway he portrayed Admiral Boom/Bank Chairman in Mary Poppins, Andrew Carnes in Oklahoma!, Beadle Bamford in Sweeney Todd: The Demon Barber of Fleet Street, Mr. Bumble in Oliver!. He starred as John Dickinson in the national tour of 1776 and J.P. Morgan in Ragtime.

McCarty died in Santa Barbara, California from heart failure after traveling there for a stage production. He was 68 years old.

== Filmography ==
Year	Title	Role	Notes
1989	Jacknife	Landlord	Scenes deleted
1995	Casper	Drunk in Bar	
1995	Dead Man	Makah Villager #3	
1996	Dunston Checks In	Tex	
1999	Dudley Do-Right	Local Banker	
2000	The Legend of Bagger Vance	Delahunty	
