= Boris Brunov =

Russian actor

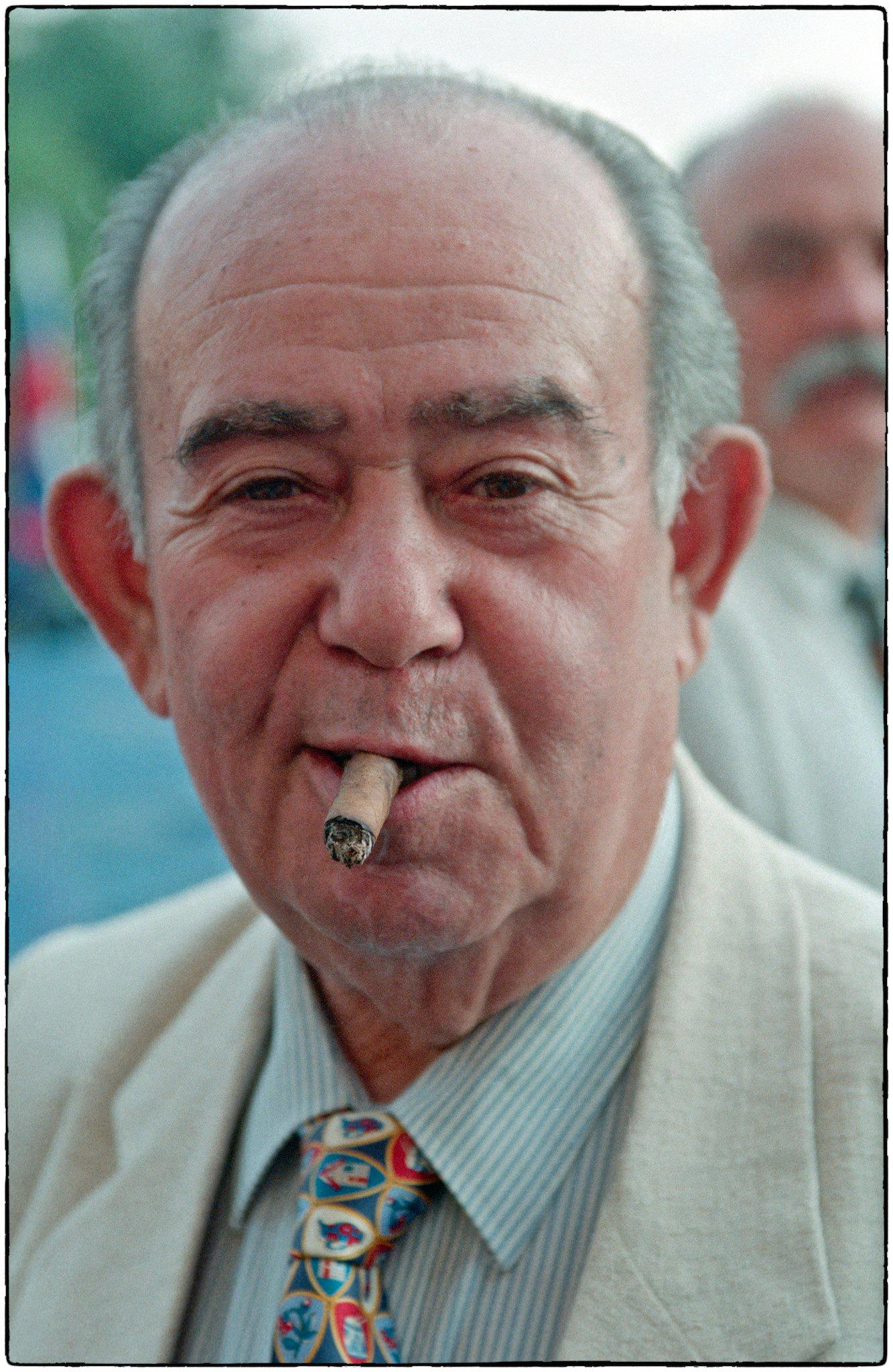
- Born: Boris Sergeyevich Brunov; 10 June 1922; Tiflis, TSFSR
- Died: 2 September 1997 (aged 75); Moscow, Russia
- Occupation(s): Actor, director, master of ceremonies
- Years active: 1948–1997

Boris Sergeyevich Brunov (Russian: Бори́с Серге́евич Бруно́в; 10 June 1922, Tiflis – 2 September 1997, Moscow) was a Soviet and Russian actor and entertainer.

In 1985, he was named a People's Artist of the RSFSR. He was a director of the Moscow State Variety Theatre.
