= Pavel Smeyan =

Russian singer and actor

Pavel Yevgenyevich Smeyan (Russian: Павел Евгеньевич Смеян; born 23 April 1957, Moscow, Russia – died 13 July 2009) was a Russian singer and actor. He died of cancer in a hospital in Germany at the age of 52.

He graduated from the Gnesins' State Institute of Music, majoring in the saxophone. He played in various philharmonics, and worked in Rosconcert and the Lenkom Theatre. He dubbed and played roles and recorded songs for more than 20 movies and animations including Mary Poppins, Goodbye, and Weather Is Good on Deribasovskaya, It Rains Again on Brighton Beach. He sang in the famous rock operas The Star and Death of Joaquin Murrieta, Juno and Avos. His first songs were first recorded on releases of the Rock Atelier band in 1981. Later the songwriter released three music albums.
