= Natalya Andreychenko =

Soviet and Russian actress (born 1956)

- Наталья Андрейченко
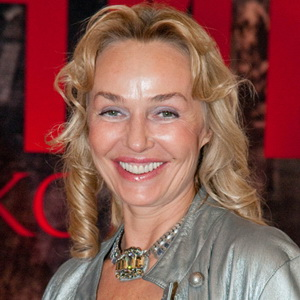
- Andrejchenko in 2010
- Born: Natalya Eduardovna Andrejchenko; May 3, 1956 (age 69); Moscow, Russian SFSR, Soviet Union
- Occupation: Actress
- Years active: 1976–present
- Spouses: Maksim Dunayevsky (m. 1981; div. 1985) Maximilian Schell (m. 1985; div. 2005)
- Children: 2

Natalya Eduardovna Andreychenko (Russian: Ната́лья Эдуа́рдовна Андре́йченко; born May 3, 1956) is a Soviet and Russian actress. She has starred in Mary Poppins, Goodbye and Wartime Romance. She has the title of Honored Artist of the RSFSR (1984).

== Biography ==
Andreychenko decided to become an actress in early high school. After an unsuccessful attempt to get into the Mikhail Shchepkin Higher Theatre School, she was admitted to the Gerasimov Institute of Cinematography where she studied under Sergei Bondarchuk and Irina Skobtseva. In 1976 she appeared in her first films From Dawn Till Sunset and Kolybelnaya dlya Muzchin. Her first successful film role was in the 1979 epic film Siberiade, which received the special jury prize at the Cannes Film Festival. However, Natalya became more popular in the Soviet Union after her roles in Mary Poppins, Goodbye and Wartime Romance, both feature films released in 1983.

== Personal life ==
From her first marriage to the Russian composer Maksim Dunayevsky she had a son named Dmitry (b. 1982), a banker by profession. In 1985–2005 she was married to the Austrian/Swiss actor, writer, producer and director Maximilian Schell, with whom she made the film Little Odessa. They have one daughter together, Anastasia Schell.

Andreychenko practices a raw food diet and is engaged in yoga.

== Filmography ==
- From Dawn Till Sunset (1975) as Valya
- Stepan's Remembrance (1976) as Tanyushka
- Dolgi nashi (Our debts) (1976)
- Kolybelnaya dlya muzhchin (Lullaby for men) (1977) as Valya Krylova
- The Steppe (1978) as Girl
- Zhnetsy (1978) as Mariya
- Ukhodya – ukhodi (If you're going away – then go) (1978)
- Torgovka i poet (Saleswoman and a Poet) (1979)
- Siberiade (1979) as Nastya Solomina
- Priletal marsianin v osennyuyu noch (1979)
- Koney na pereprave ne menyayut (1980)
- Ladies Invite Gentlemen (1981) as Raisa
- Chelovek, kotoryy zakryl gorod (A Man Who Has Closed the City) (1982) as Nina Lazareva
- Lyudmila (1982)
- Wartime Romance (1983) as Lyuba
- Dvoe pod odnim zontom: Aprelskaya skazka (Two under a one umbrella) (1983) as Lyudmila
- Meri Poppins, do svidaniya (1984, TV Movie) as Mary Poppins
- Maritsa (1985, TV Movie) as Maritsa
- Peter the Great (1986, TV Mini-Series) as Eudoxia
- Forgive Me (1986) as Maria
- Lady Macbeth of the Mtsensk District (1989) as Yekaterina
- Candles in the Dark (1993, TV Movie) as Marta Velliste
- Ne idet... (1994)
- Little Odessa (1994) as Natasha
- Aurora: Operation Intercept (1995) as Francesca Zaborszin
- Dr. Quinn, Medicine Woman (1997, TV Series) as Princess Nizamova
- Modern Vampires (1998, TV Movie) as Panthia
- 8 ½ $ (1999) as Kseniya
- NYPD Blue (2000, TV Series) as Leah Shenkov
- Give Me Moonlight (2001)
- Down House (2001)
- O'key (2002)
- My Big Armenian Wedding (2004, TV Mini-Series) as Lena's Mother
- Quiet Flows the Don (2006, TV Mini-Series) as Dariya
- Ochen russkiy detektiv (2008)
- Na kryshe mira(2008) as Elena Naumova

=== Self ===
- Meine Schwester Maria (2002) as Natascha Schell
