= Maksim Dunayevsky =

Soviet and Russian composer

Maksim Dunayevsky Максим Исаакович Дунаевский
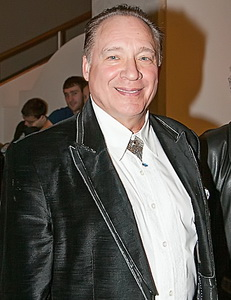
- Born: Maksim Isaakovich Dunayevsky; 15 January 1945 (age 81); Moscow, RSFSR, Soviet Union
- Occupation: Composer
- Years active: 1964 — present
- Title: People's Artist of Russia (2006)
- Spouse: Natalya Andreychenko (m. 1981; div. 1985)
- Awards: Order of Honour; (2019)

Maksim Isaakovich Dunayevsky (Russian: Макси́м Исаа́кович Дунае́вский; born 15 January 1945 in Moscow) is a Soviet and Russian composer. People's Artist of Russia (2006). He is the artistic director and chairman of the artistic council of the Moscow Regional Philharmonic since 2015.

== Biography ==
Maksim Dunayevsky was born on 15 January 1945 in Moscow.

He is the son of the composer Isaak Dunayevsky and the ballerina of the Alexandrov Ensemble and the Moscow Operetta Theater Zoya Ivanovna Pashkova (1922-1994), born out of wedlock. Maksim's elder brother on the father's side, Eugene (1932-2000) was an artist.

From 1969 to 1974, Dunayevsky was the conductor of the Vakhtangov Theater. In 1974-1975, he was the chief conductor and music director of the Moscow music hall, in 1985-1987 he was the Artistic Director and Chief Conductor of the State Pop Orchestra of the RSFSR (he attracted such people as Pavel Smeyan, Irina Ponarovskaya, Boris Oppenheim, Weiland Rodd, Andrey Davidyan and musicians of the rock group SV), and in 1987, a musical director of the Theater-Studio of Musical Drama (artistic director Yuri Sherling).

Maksim Dunayevsky organized his own pop ensemble, which also played rock, called "Festival" (1977-1990), he collaborated as a songwriter with such poets as Leonid Derbenyov, Naum Olev, Yuri Ryashentsev, Ilya Reznik, Robert Rozhdestvensky, Yuri Entin, and Nikolai Denisov. In 1994, especially for Nikolai Karachentsov, he wrote 10 songs based on poems by Ilya Reznik, which were later included in the actor's solo album "My Little Lady", recorded by him in Los Angeles.

He lived in the USA for almost eight years (1992 - 1999), worked in Hollywood, wrote music for several films.

Since 2015, he has been artistic director and chairman of the Artistic Council of the Moscow Regional Philharmonic.

== Personal life ==
Maksim Dunayevsky was married seven times. Wives: Natalya Leonova, Regina Temirbulatova, Elena Dunayevskaya, Natalya Andrejchenko (actress), Olga Danilova (fashion model), Olga Sheronova, Marina Rozhdestvenskaya (b. November 11, 1972).

The son from a marriage with actress Natalya Andrejchenko, Dmitry (b. 1982), lives in Switzerland.

Daughter Alina (born 1983) from Nina Spada - philologist, translator from foreign languages and writer (in June 2018 she published a book of autobiographical content "Wide open with my soul. Maksim Dunayevsky in my life"). Alina has been living in France since the age of four, where she organized her own rock group "Markize". Author-composer-performer of her songs in the style of pop-rock, has recorded and released several music albums, video clips and singles.

In 2002, the seventh wife of the composer Marina Rozhdestvenskaya gave birth to a daughter, Polina. Dunayevsky did not adopt the eldest daughter of Rozhdestvenskaya Maria (born 1995), but allowed her to take his surname.

Since 2019, 75-year-old Dunayevsky has a new relationship with musicologist Alla Novoselova. The composer has an apartment in Moscow and a country house in Alabino.

== Social activities and charity ==
In addition to creativity, Maksim Dunayevsky is actively involved in social activities and charity. He is the President of the Isaac Dunayevsky Charitable Cultural Foundation, Deputy Chairman of the Guild of Professional Composers, Academician of the Russian National Film Academy, a member of the expert council of the first television channel on selection for the Eurovision Song Contest and the annual music program New Songs about the Main. The last two facts somewhat contradict his statements about contemporary pop music (“I don’t want to name names or comment on it somehow. I think most of them would be good to sing at the table. Singing requires a lot of professionalism. It is not enough to be a popular figure. This should be learned Now everyone who is not lazy is singing. I can say in another way: who has money. It's another matter that with the last broadcast, any mention disappears, the name and appearance of the performer, who was recently known, are erased in the memory "). He highly appreciated Dima Bilan and Aleksandr Panayotov.

== Soundtracks ==
- Car, Violin and Blot the Dog (1974)
- D'Artagnan and Three Musketeers (1979)
- Flying Ship (1979)
- Carnival (1981)
- The Trust That Has Burst (1983)
- Mary Poppins, Goodbye (1984)
- Dangerous for Your Life! (1985)
- In Search for Captain Grant (1986)
- A Bright Personality (1988)
- Island of Rusty General (1988)
- The Witches Cave (1990)
- A Trap for Lonely Man (1990)
- Musketeers Twenty Years After (1992)
- The Secret of Queen Anne or Musketeers Thirty Years After (1993)
- Deadly Force-6 (2004)
- The Return of the Musketeers, or The Treasures of Cardinal Mazarin (2009)
- The Ballad of Uhlans (2012)
- About Love (2017)
- Checkered Zebra (2020)
- Zabezoo. Ears 'n Tale (2021)
