= Zhenya Belousov =

Soviet and Russian pop singer (1964–1997)

Zhenya Belousov Женя Белоусов
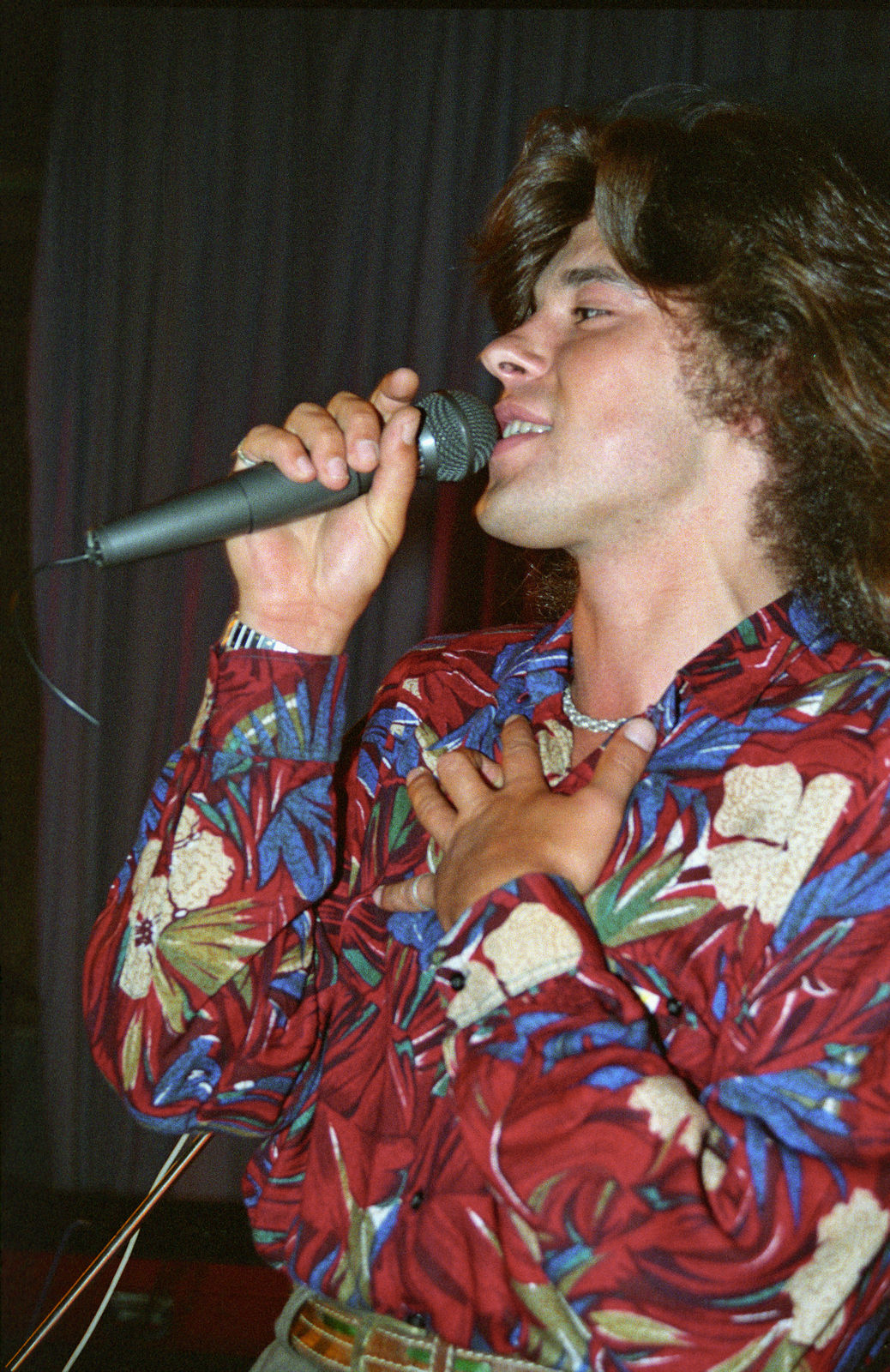
- Belousov in 1991

Background information
- Born: Evgeny Viktorovich Belousov; September 10, 1964; Zhikhar, Kharkiv Oblast, Ukrainian SSR, Soviet Union
- Died: June 2, 1997 (aged 32) Moscow, Russia
- Occupation: Singer
- Years active: 1985–1997

Yevgeny Viktorovich Belousov (Russian: Евгений Викторович Белоусов; September 10, 1964 — June 2, 1997), better known as Zhenya Belousov (Russian: Женя Белоусов), was a Soviet and Russian pop singer, popular in the late 1980s – early 1990s. His best-known hits include My Blue-Eyed Girl, Night Taxi, Alyoshka, Devchonka-Devchonochka, Evening-Evening, Hair Cloud, Golden Domes, Short Summer, Dunya-Dunyasha, In the Evening on a Bench.

== Biography ==
Yevgeny Viktorovich Belousov was born on September 10, 1964, in the village of Zhikhar, Kharkiv Oblast.

He graduated from vocational school No 1 as mechanic-repairman and later studied at the Kursk Music College, learning bass guitar. He was not conscripted to the army due to heavy concussion he suffered in a car crash as a schoolboy.

In the mid-1980s Bari Alibasov saw Belousov playing in a Kursk restaurant and invited him to join his band Integral as a singing bassist. In 1987 he started a solo career and enjoyed success with a series of hits, collected in three studio albums, My Blue-Eyed Girl (1988), Night Taxi (1990) and Devchonka-Devchonochka (1993).

Starting with 1993, Belousov's health started to deteriorate and his popularity nose-dived. His stint as a distillery businessman in Ryazan proved to be a failure and he was accused of tax evasion. In March 1997, he was taken to the Sklifosovsky Institute with acute pancreatitis. A month later he suffered a stroke (earlier head injuries and alcohol abuse cited as possible causes) and underwent a brain surgery.

On 2 June 1997 Belousov died at the Sklifosovsky hospital, and was interred in the Kuntsevo Cemetery.

== Legacy ==
On 2 June 2006, a museum dedicated to Belousov's creative career and life was opened at Vocational School No. 1 in Kursk (now a vocational lyceum), where he had studied.

In 2006, Channel One released the documentary The Short Summer of Zhenya Belousov, about the singer's life, career, and the circumstances of his death.

One episode of Channel One's programme Tonight, broadcast on 24 June 2017, was devoted to the life and career of Yevgeny Belousov.

The Life and Death of Zhenya Belousov, a documentary by Vadim Takmenyov, aired on NTV.

One episode of the Russia-1 programme Hello, Andrey!, broadcast on 16 February 2019, was devoted to the life and career of Yevgeny Belousov.
