= Leonid Kvinikhidze =

Russian film director and screenwriter (1937–2018)

- Born: Leonid Aleksandrovich Faintsimmer; 21 December 1937; Leningrad, Soviet Union
- Died: 13 March 2018 (aged 80); Saint Petersburg, Russia
- Occupations: screenwriter film director
- Years active: 1960—2018
- Awards: Golden Mask (2006)

Leonid Aleksandrovich Kvinikhidze (Russian: Леонид Александрович Квинихидзе; 21 December 1937 – 13 March 2018) was a Russian screenwriter and film director His father, Aleksandr Faintsimmer, was also a film director.

His first wife was the ballerina Natalia Makarova.

He died in Saint Petersburg on 13 March 2018.

== Selected filmography ==
Year	Title	Role	Notes
1968	Moabite Notebook	director	
1973	Failure of Engineer Garin	director	
1974	The Straw Hat	director, screenwriter	
1976	Heavenly Swallows	director, screenwriter	
1978	31 June	director, screenwriter	TV
1983	Mary Poppins, Goodbye	director	
1987	Friend	director	
1992	White Nights	director	
