= Mary Poppins, Goodbye =

- Based on: Mary Poppins by P. L. Travers
- Written by: Vladimir Valutsky
- Directed by: Leonid Kvinikhidze
- Starring: Natalya Andreychenko; Albert Filozov; Lembit Ulfsak; Oleg Tabakov; Larisa Udovichenko
- Music by: Maksim Dunayevsky
- Country of origin: Soviet Union
- Original language: Russian

Production
- Cinematography: Valentin Piganov, Eduard Kerch
- Running time: 141 min.
- Production company: Mosfilm

Original release
- Release: January 8, 1984

Mary Poppins, Goodbye (Russian: Мэри Поппинс, до свидания!; translit. Meri Poppins, do svidaniya) is a Soviet two-part musical miniseries directed by Leonid Kvinikhidze. The movie's runtime is 141 minutes spread across two episodes/parts, "Lady Perfection" (Russian: "Леди Совершенство") and "Week Ends on Wednesday" (Russian: "Неделя кончается в среду"). It is based on the Mary Poppins stories by P. L. Travers. The TV series was produced by Mosfilm for Gosteleradio. The official television premiere was on January 8, 1984.

== Plot ==
=== Episode 1: Lady Perfection ===
The film is set in 1980s London, at Number 17, Cherry Tree Lane, where the Banks family lives, they are Mr and Mrs Banks and their children Jane and Michael. They are also hosting Mrs Banks' brother Robert Robertson, who is living in a tent in their yard. Robert is a singer and a poet, quickly improvising songs in difficult situations. Mr Banks keeps making unfortunate investments, putting a strain on their budget. The family is trying to find a new nanny "for the smallest income possible", and soon after an advertisement is posted in a newspaper. In response, the mysterious lady called Mary Poppins arrives at their door.

Mary Poppins is shown to have magical powers and leads the children, Jane and Michael, on many magical adventures. She can understand animal language and translates their neighbor's Kathy Lark dialogue with her dog Edward, when it poses an ultimatum for her master.

Mary brings the children to a butcher's to buy sausages and having a cold reception, she makes the butcher sing with an opera voice.

The next morning Banks arrives with a boring machine intending to look for oil reserves but this fails due to a protest by Robert, blocking the way and singing.

Mary and the children take a walk in the park, where they see a statue turn alive asking old Mr Wilkins to let finish reading the magazine story over the shoulder of the old man. The statue of Neleus dances and talks with Jane telling her about his distant parents and his story also confessing in love. Mary is entertained by a conversation with an old crow promising her the change of wind. The park keeper is praised by a policeman observing the statue back on its place.

Mary leaves the family as the wind is changing and instructs Robert to act up. Indeed, he mounts on the bulldozer and starts drilling the surface starting a fountain of fire which the children are happy to see as an adventure.

=== Episode 2: The Week Ends on Wednesday ===
Mr Banks is blamed by the local authorities for the breach in the gas pipe and fined £13,500 to be paid by the end of the week, "ending on Wednesday".

An unexpected arrival of Bank's childhood nanny Miss Euphemia Andrew (portrayed by a male actor Tabakov, out of the ordinary for Soviet cinema) turns the house into a discipline camp and Mr Banks flees.

He hides in Admiral Boom's bunker and resorts to drinking with him. From the TV report they learn of a fund Ms Andrew established to reward her best ward with £15,000. He returns and the whole family tries to win the prize with exemplary behavior, even going as far as locking protesting Robert in the basement.

Mary returns when the sad children take a walk in the park and she quickly restores peace at home removing Ms Andrew who retreats on a cab. The same night the whole family is invited to a dancing ball where they see their neighbors all participating.

Mary is celebrating her birthday at the ball. Returning home they see a fantastic merry-go-round with their neighbors talking to their childhood selves, while Robert receives a guitar as a goodbye gift from Mary Poppins.

== Cast ==
- Natalya Andreychenko as Mary Poppins (singing dubbed by Tatyana Voronina)
- Albert Filozov as Mr. George Banks
- Larisa Udovichenko as Mrs. Banks
- Filipp Rukavishnikov as Michael Banks (singing dubbed by Svetlana Stepchenko)
- Anna Plisetskaya as Jane Banks (singing dubbed by Svetlana Stepchenko) and young Mrs. Banks
- Lembit Ulfsak as Mr. Ay (Robert Robertson), Michael and Jane's uncle and Mrs. Banks' brother (voice and singing dubbed by Pavel Smeyan)
- Oleg Tabakov as Miss Euphemia Andrew
- Irina Skobtseva as Mrs. Katie Lark, the Banks' neighbor and owner of two dogs named Edward "Eddie" and Bartholemew
- Zinovy Gerdt as Admiral Henry Boom
- Marina Nudga as Madame Corry, the Ballet Studio Manager
- Gali Abajdulov as Sire Louis, the Dancing Cat
- Semyon Sokolovsky as Sir Wilkins, the Elderly Gentleman and an admirer of the literary hero Insightful Bill
- Igor Yasulovich as Smith, the Park Keeper
- Pavel Babakov as Butcher
- Leonid Kanevsky as Bob Goodetty, the Excavator Operator
- Yuri Moroz as Postman
- Ilya Rutberg as Official
- Emmanuil Levin as Policeman (voiced by Artyom Karapetyan)
- Vladimir Karklinsh as Neleus the Marble Boy and the Son of the Sea King
- Georgy Millyar as the voices of Raven and Sir Thomas, the parrot (uncredited)
- Anatoli Gorokhov (backing vocals)

== Production ==
Leonid Kvinikhidze reported in an interview later that his intention was not a film for kids, but for adults. The fact that it was very well received by children was unexpected for him.

The musical material was recorded by three former members of the band Voskreseniye, Vadim Golutvin (guitar), Petr Podgorodetskiy (keyboard), and Vladimir Voronin (drums).
