= Fabrika Zvyozd =

Russian television talent show

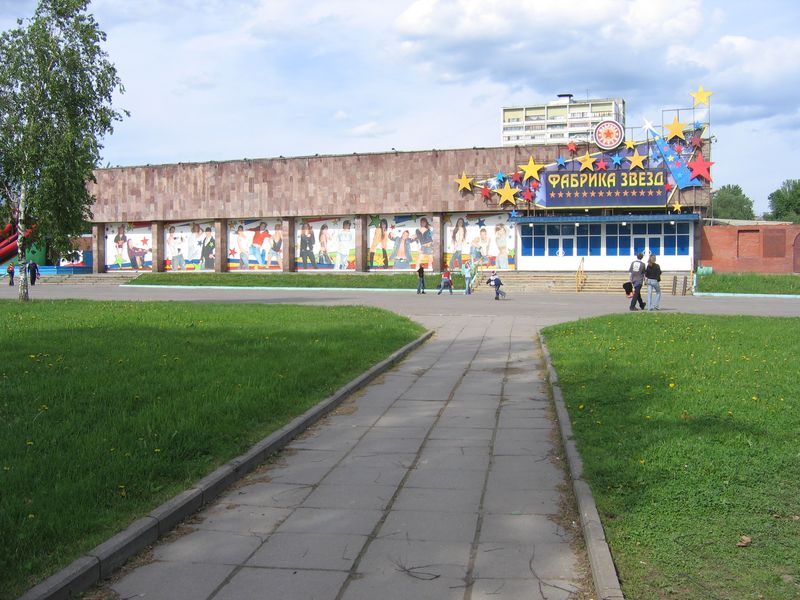
- Fabrika Zvyozd's "Star House" in 2006.
- Russian: Фабрика звёзд
- Genre: Talent show
- Created by: Endemol
- Based on: Operación Triunfo
- Creative directors: Igor Matvienko (1; 5; 8-9); Maxim Fadeev (2; 5; 9); Alexander Shulgin (3); Igor Krutoy (4; 8-9); Alla Pugacheva (5); Viktor Drobysh (6; 8-10); Valery Meladze (7); Konstantin Meladze (7-9); Natalia Mohylevska (9)
- Presented by: Yana Churikova (1-9); Ksenia Sobchak (10)
- Opening theme: Kruto ty popal na TV
- Composer: Igor Matvienko
- Country of origin: Russia
- Original language: Russian
- No. of seasons: 10

Production
- Executive producers: Lina Alifulina (1-5); Yuriy Aksyuta (5-7); Yulia Sumacheva (10)

Original release
- Network: Pervyi Kanal (1-9); Muz-TV (10)
- Release: October 13, 2002 – December 16, 2017

Related
- Interzvezda (Note: Announced but axed before production started.)

Fabrika Zvyozd (Russian: Фабрика звёзд, literally "Factory of stars"), sometimes known internationally as Star Factory, is a Russian television talent show that aired on Channel One from 2002 until 2007. It was the Russian version of the Endemol format Operación Triunfo. In 2011, the show announced that it would be returning with an eighth, All-Star season and in 2012 for the ninth season with the format Star Factory: Russia vs. Ukraine. The programme then went on a hiatus for five years before relaunching the tenth season in 2017 broadcast on Muz-TV. Nine out of ten seasons were hosted by Yana Churikova and one by Ksenia Sobchak.

Fabrika Zvyozd, meaning Star Factory, stayed true to its name in Russia; many of the contestants, nicknamed as "fabrikanty" (Russian: фабриканты), have established successful careers in the Russian-language music world. The show's alumni include Polina Gagarina, Fabrika, Zara, Irina Dubtsova, Timati, Yulia Savicheva, Natalia Podolskaya, Dmitry Koldun, Anastasia Prikhodko, and Elena Temnikova. The show also had a tight connection with the Eurovision Song Contest. In total, seven of the past fabrikanty sang at the contest at some stage between 2004 and 2019.

Throughout its run, Fabrika Zvyozd had high television ratings. In 2006, the show was so popular that producers decided to prolong the season by one whole month mid-season. This decision was regarded controversial, because contestants had to stay inside the house against their wishes for an extra month. The 2017 series was less successful in its ratings and finished its final with a market share of 1.3%.

Fabrika Zvyozd gained a cult status in Russia. It was the first real Russian reality music competition and the first reality show on Channel One Russia. Although it was axed in 2007 in favour of Interzvezda, which was later cancelled in its production phase, the show and its contestants stayed popular long after its axing. In 2017, Channel One Russia featured a special two-week special of Segodnya vecherom about Fabrika Zvyozd, celebrating the show's fifteenth anniversary. The episodes mostly focused on the contestants’ fate after the show.

In 2020, the show became popular on the internet due to the lockdown in Russia as a result of the COVID-19 pandemic. In August 2020, Channel One Russia made a four-hour long special broadcast on Fabrika Zvyozd on the television programme Segodnya vecherom, hosted by Maksim Galkin and Yana Churikova. In this programme, a large share of the successful contestants were re-invited to look back on their memories of the time they were on the show. Next to that, Channel One rebroadcast a selection of some of the best performances in the show's history in primetime slots. The broadcasts solely focused on the first seven series, neglecting the revival version that was produced by Muz-TV.

On 9 January 2022, the producer of the tenth season of the show, Yulia Sumacheva, confirmed that the show is set to return in 2022.

== Format ==
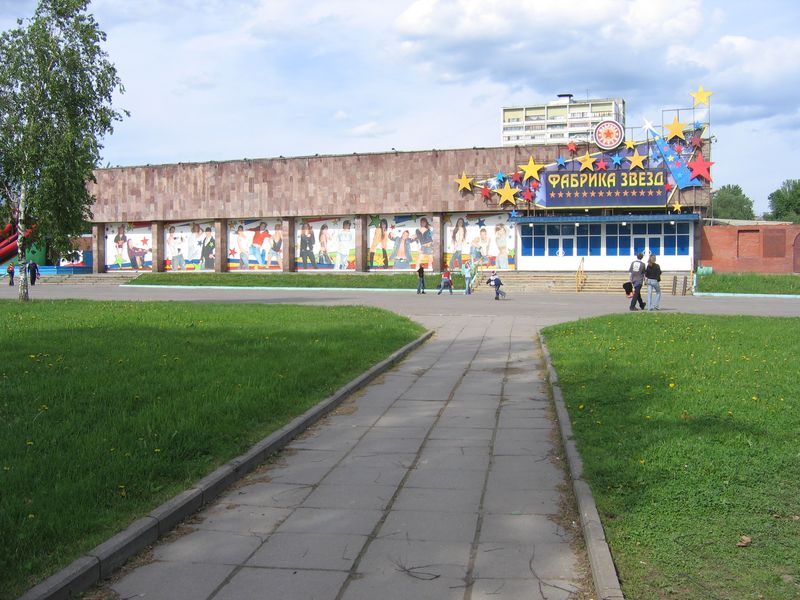
Fabrika Zvyozd's house in 2006.

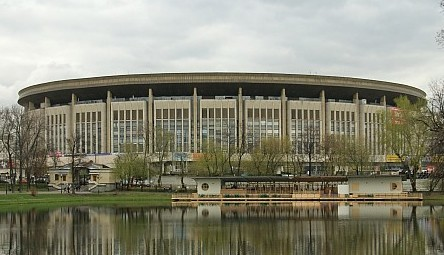
Olympic Stadium in Moscow.

Similarly to Operación Triunfo, in Fabrika Zvyozd a selection of young potential musical stars is boarded in a house together. In this house, they are constantly monitored by cameras, an idea borrowed from another of Endemol's major reality shows Big Brother. In the house, they are "produced" or "manufactured" by an important Russian producer to become household names in the Russian music world once the show is over. In daily summary programmes, viewers are informed about the daily activities of the contestants.

After an “opening ceremony” in the first week, every single week, the contestants come together during a so-called “reporting concert” on Saturday to show their progress. Each show, one of the contestants gets dropped until a handful remain for the final.

The Monday before each concert, three contestants are nominated to be eliminated. These three nominees sing solo numbers on the Friday or Saturday show, while the safe contestants usually sing duets with famous artists. The nominations are based on the verdicts of the producers and can be either a good or a bad sign. At times, nominations are awarded because producers want to see a well-performing contestant sing a solo number, while other times, the weaker contestants are nominated. In rare cases, contestants are nominated for displaying poor behaviour.

From Monday to Saturday, viewers can vote for their favourite among the nominations. The winner of the televoting gets an automatic pass to stay in the house. The safe contestants determine themselves who gets the final pass to stay and who gets eliminated. Once per season, the producer is allowed to save a contestant from elimination as a veto right, although not all producers have exercised this privilege. (Note: In season 1, Igor Matvienko used the veto to save all contestants during the eight concert. In season 4, Igor Krutoy saved Irina Dubtsova during the ninth concert. In season 5, Alla Pugacheva saved Mike Mironenko during the sixth concert, while the musical producers saved Miguel and Ruslan Masyukov during the 12th and 13th concerts respectively. In season 6, Viktor Drobysh saved Prokhor Chaliapin during the 7th concert. In season 10, Viktor Drobysh saved Lolita Voloshina during the 2nd concert and Philipp Kirkorov saved Ulyana Sinetskaya during the 7th concert.) Additionally, the audience chooses their favourite overall performer, who receives a prize.

In the original run of the show, the final concert was held in the Olympic Stadium in Moscow. In this concert, all of the contestants of the season would return to perform the best songs of the season once again. In 2007, the last series of the original run, the producers opted to hold the final in the usual television studio at the Ostankino Technical Center instead, as all other episodes were taped there. The 2017 revival's final was also held in a television studio rather than in the Olympic Stadium.

== Series overview ==
Series	Year	Winner	Runner-up	Third place	Fourth place	Fifth place	Sixth place	Host	Headmaster
1	2002	Korni	Fabrika	Mikhail Grebenshikov	Yuliya Buzhilova	Ekaterina Shemyakina	Konstantin Dudoladov	Yana Churikova	Igor Matvienko
2	2003	Polina Gagarina	Yelena Terleyeva	Elena Temnikova	Maria Rzhevskaya	Yulia Savicheva	Kristian Leinich	Yana Churikova	Max Fadeev
3	2003	Nikita Malinin	Aleksandr Kireev	Yulia Mikhalchik	Svetlana Svetikova	Ruslan Kurik	Irina Ortman	Yana Churikova	Alexander Shulgin
4	2004	Irina Dubtsova	Anton Zatsepin	Stas Piekha	Aleksa	Yuriy Titov	Timati	Yana Churikova	Igor Krutoy
5	2004	Victoria Dayneko	Ruslan Masyukov	Mikhail Veselov; Natalia Podolskaya	Not announced			Yana Churikova	Alla Pugacheva
6	2006	Dmitry Koldun	Arseny Borodin	Zara	Prokhor Chaliapin	Alexandra Gurkova	Roman Arkhipov	Yana Churikova	Viktor Drobysh
7	2007	Anastasiya Prikhodko	Mark Tishman	Yin-Yang; BiS	Dakota	Korneliya Mango	Nataliya Tumshevits	Yana Churikova	Konstantin Meladze; Valery Meladze
All-Stars	2011	Victoria Dayneko	Chelsea	Irina Dubtsova	Not announced			Yana Churikova	various
Russia vs. Ukraine	2012	Russia	Ukraine	Not announced				Yana Churikova	various
New	2017	Guzel Hasanova	Mastank	Sever17; Daniil Danilevsky	Not announced			Ksenia Sobchak	Viktor Drobysh
New 2024	2024	Maria Gordeeva	Nonna Yeganyan, Daria Kochneva, Sofia Polozova, Semyon Polishchuk, Alexander Filin, Gabriel Alexandrov					Regina Todorenko; Timur Rodriguez	Sergey Shnurov; Sergey Zhukov

=== First season (2002) ===
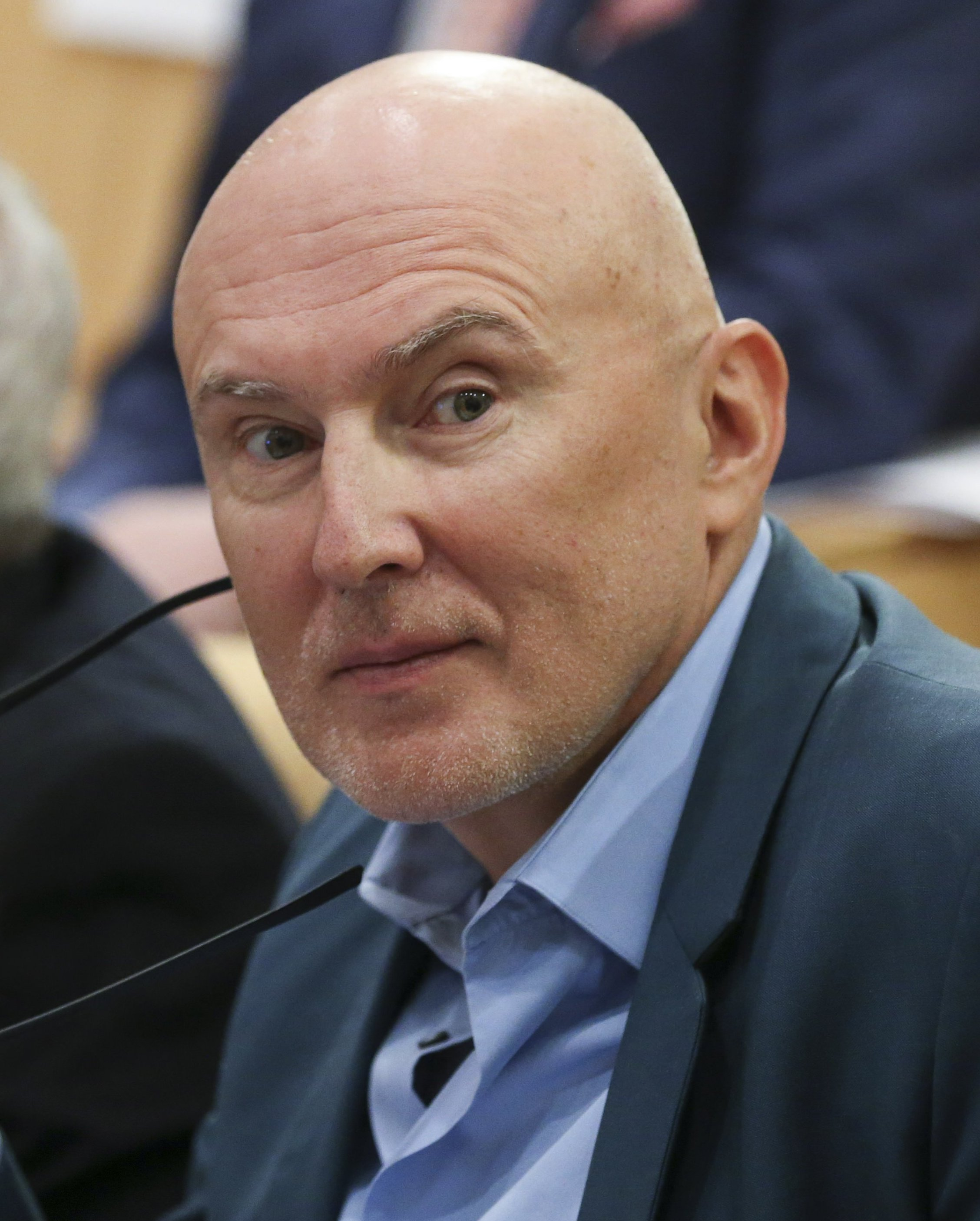
Igor Matvienko was the producer of the first season.

The very first series of Fabrika Zvyozd was commissioned by Channel One with the interest of Igor Matvienko, who wanted to create a new platform for young musical talent after Morning Star had ended a year earlier. Although auditions were held across Russia, most of the contestants of the first series of Fabrika Zvyozd had been recruited elsewhere. Yulia Buzhilova had already been working with Igor Matvienko prior to the season's debut. During the first episode, all contestants and star duet partners sang live, unlike later seasons of the show.

The first season of the show knew two incidents. During the second concert, singer Yuriy Antonov and contestant Nikolay Burlak were supposed to open the concert, but Antonov had felt insulted by the young Burlak asking him: “Are you the one that sings with me tonight?” to which Antonov answered that he did not want to perform with Burlak anymore. Eventually, the producers persuaded Antonov to perform with Burlak, but they rescheduled the duet to a later moment in the show. During the third concert, the first black contestant of the show, Sherif Musa, was voted away after facing the contestants’ vote. In later interviews, he noted that several contestants had made racist comments towards the colour of his skin.

The final of the show took place in May 2002 in the Olympic Stadium in Moscow. Prior to the final, Matvienko decided that Artemiev, Astashenok, Berdnikov and Kabanov were to form a boyband, while Kazanova, Toneva, Savelyeva and Alalykina were to form a girl group. Unlike other seasons, the final result was not determined on the basis of televoting, but rather by the producers. For finishing third, Mikhail Grebenshikov received an apartment in Moscow. Fabrika received a minibus for finishing second. Winners Korni received a recording deal, a tour through Russia, a microphone and the opportunity to represent Russia at Eurobest in Paris.

After the show, Korni and Fabrika became breakout successes. While Fabrika stayed popular in the Russian-speaking world, the popularity of Korni gradually declined, especially after Artemiev and Astashenok left the group. Sati Kazanova left Fabrika in 2010, establishing a solo career. Most of the participants of the first season of Fabrika Zvyozd went into oblivion.

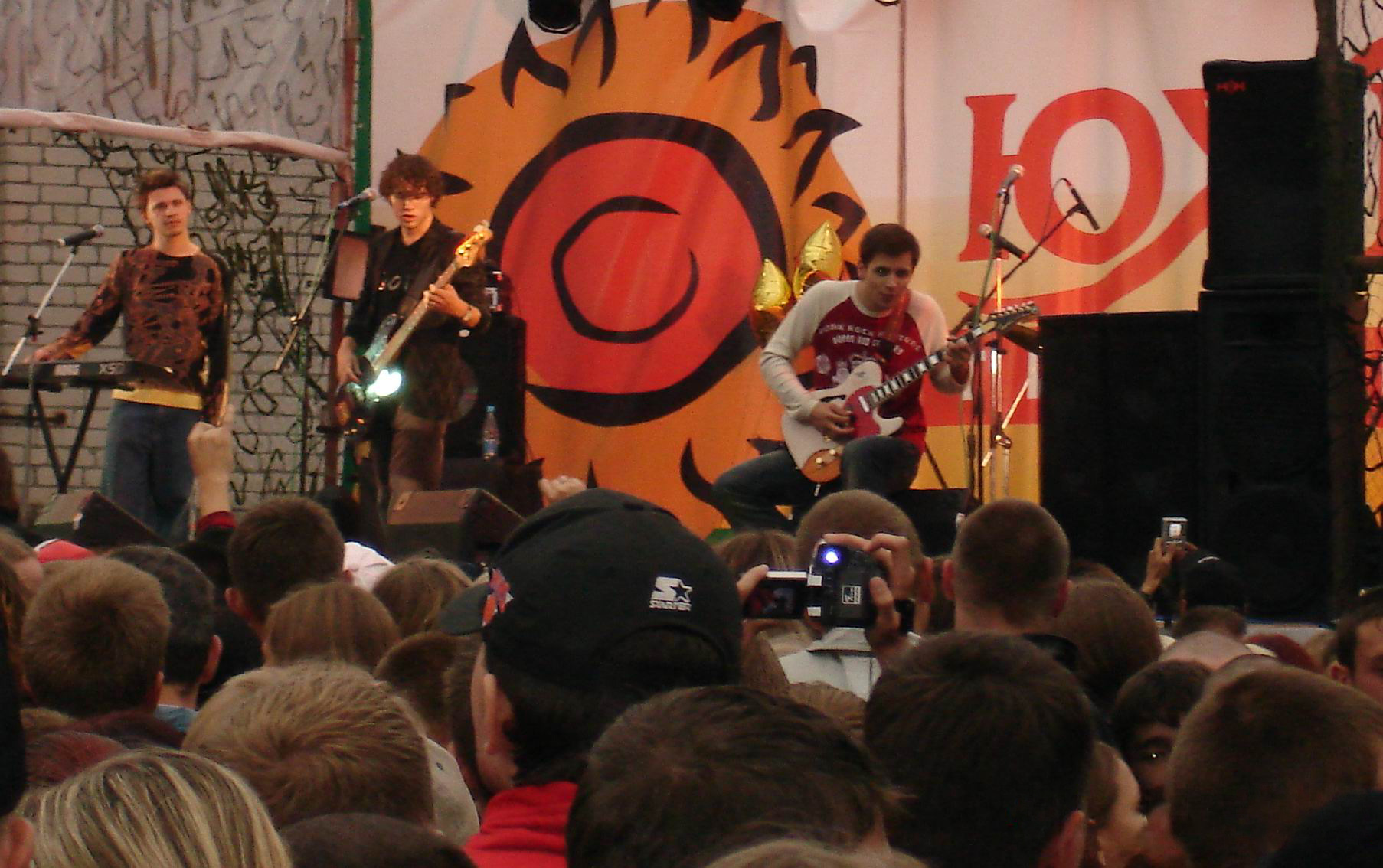
Korni won the inaugural season of Fabrika Zvyozd.

Contestant	Age	Origin	Episode of elimination	Place finished
Pavel Artemiev	19	Olomouc	Final	Winner as part of Korni
Aleksandr Astashenok	20	Orenburg	Final	Winner as part of Korni
Aleksandr Berdnikov	21	Ashgabat	Final	Winner as part of Korni
Aleksei Kabanov	19	Moscow	Final	Winner as part of Korni
Sati Kazanova	20	Verkhny Kurkuzhin	Final	Runner-up as part of Fabrika
Irina Toneva	25	Krasnoznamensk	Final	Runner-up as part of Fabrika
Aleksandra Savelyeva	18	Moscow	Final	Runner-up as part of Fabrika
Maria Alalykina	19	Moscow	Final	Runner-up as part of Fabrika
Mikhail Grebenshikov	26	Voronezh	Final	3rd
Yulia Buzhilova	19	Kyiv	Gala 9	10th
Ekaterina Shemyakina	23	Moscow	Gala 7	11th
Konstantin Dudoladov	31	Nakhodka	Gala 6	12th
Nikolay Burlak	28	Perm	Gala 5	13th
Anna Kulikova	20	Moscow	Gala 4	14th
Zhanna Cherukhina	19	St. Petersburg	Withdrew (Note: Cherukhina became the only contestant to have withdrawn from Fabrika Zvyozd during its screening. In the week between Galas 3 and 4, Cherukhina packed her things and left the house unexpectedly, stating that the show "didn't work" for her.)	
Sherif Musa (JAM)	27	Ifo	Gala 3	16th
Gera Tuzikov (Gera Levi)	17	Tolyatti	Gala 2	17th

Producer: Igor Matvienko

=== Second season (Early 2003) ===
The second series of the show was commissioned after the first series received overall great ratings and the producers wanted to continue to support new opportunities for young talented Russian singers. The second series was led by producer Maxim Fadeev, starting on 6 March 2003. Similar to the first series, Fadeev recruited several artists by himself and invited them on a personal basis. Oxana Fedorova was given an offer to host but she declined.

The final of the show took place in the Olympic Stadium in Moscow on 11 June 2003. For finishing third, Elena Temnikova received the microphone she used during the length of the series. Yelena Terleyeva was promised an album and several music videos. Polina Gagarina was allowed to represent Russia at the international festival Worldbest in Paris. However, Gagarina refused to sign a contract with Fadeev and instead, Yulia Savicheva was sent to the festival.

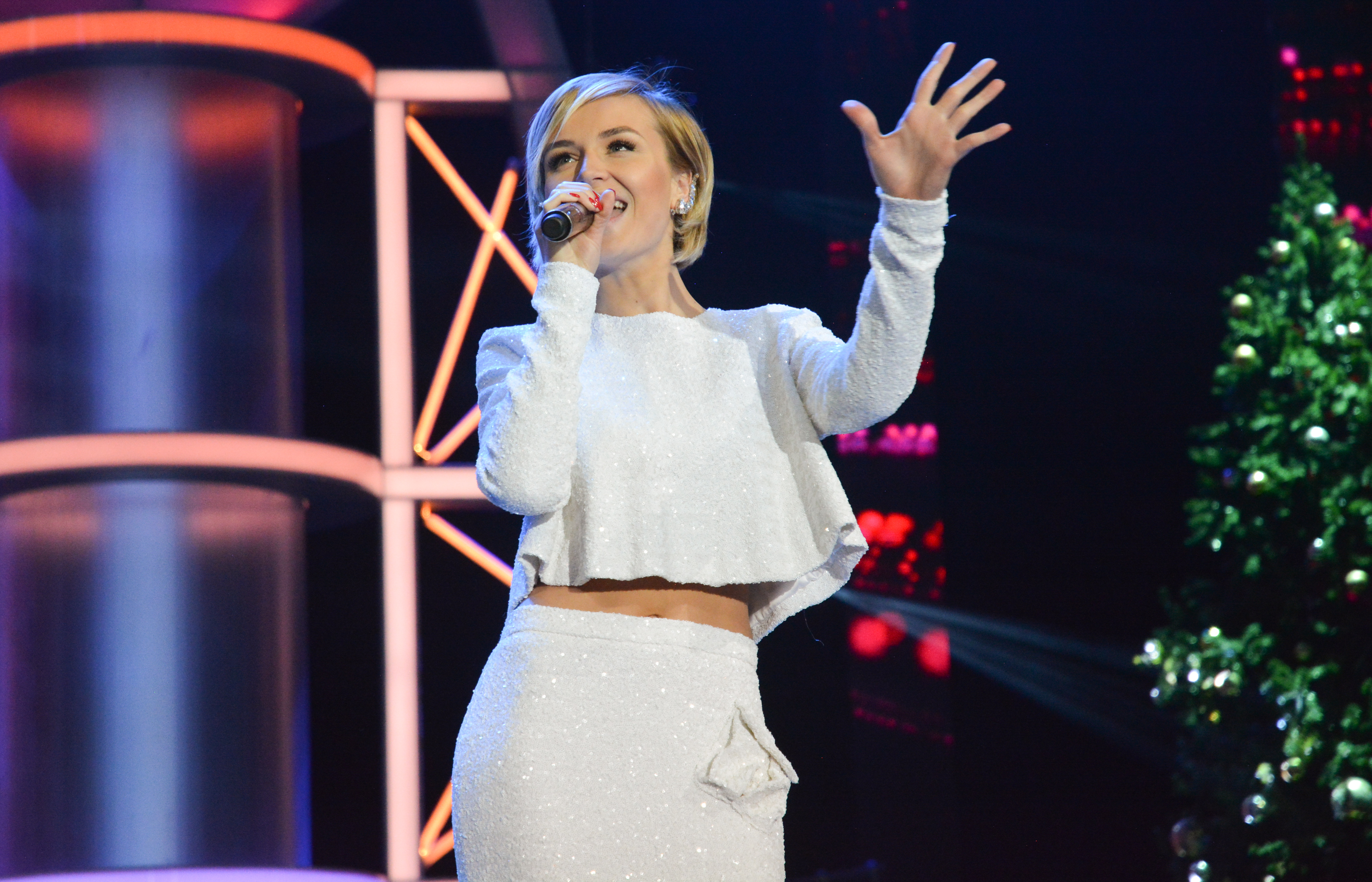
Polina Gagarina (pictured 2015) won season 2 of Fabrika Zvyozd.

Contestant	Age	Origin	Episode of elimination	Place finished
Polina Gagarina	15	Moscow	Final	Winner
Yelena Terleyeva	17	Surgut	Final	Runner-up
Elena Temnikova	17	Kurgan	Final	3rd
Yulia Savicheva	16	Kurgan	Semi-final	4th
Maria Rzhevskaya	15	Moscow	Semi-final	5th
Kristian Leinich	21	Ukhta	Gala 12	6th
Irakliy Pirzhalava	25	Moscow	Gala 11	7th
Pierre Narcisse	26	Cameroon	Gala 10	8th
Aleksei Semyonov	27	Nizhniy Novgorod	Gala 9	9th
Marianna Belezkaya	20	Moscow	Gala 8	10th
Dmitriy Praskov'in	18	Tolyatti	Gala 7	11th
Evgeniya Rasskazova	23	Novosibirsk	Gala 6	12th
Gennadiy Lagutin	22	Udmurtia	Gala 5	13th
Mikhail Reshetnikov	20	Moscow	Gala 4	14th
Yuliya Volkova	20	Ostrogozhsk	Gala 3	15th
Dmitriy Astashenok	17	Orenburg	Gala 2	16th

Producer: Maxim Fadeev

=== Third season (Late 2003) ===
The third season was led by producer Alexander Shulgin. Initially, both Ivan Shapovalov and Alla Pugacheva had been rumoured to be the season's producer. The third Fabrika Zvyozd became infamous for the inclusion of children of famous Russian singers. The show included Nikita Malinin, the son of Alexander Malinin, Sofiya Kuzmina, the daughter of Vladimir Kuzmin and Nikolai Slichenko Jr, the grandson of Nikolai Slichenko. According to an editor at the time, they had chosen them because it would be more interesting for the viewers to see familiar names. The season ran from 5 September until 12 December 2003, when the season was completed with a final concert held in the Olympic Stadium in Moscow.

For winning the third season, Nikita Malinin received a music video and the opportunity to sing at a festival. Kireev received the proposal to record a solo album from Shulgin and received a piano from the producers at Channel One. For finishing third, Yulia Mikhalchik received the proposal to record an album and release a music video. During the final, Yulia Mikhalchik received a wedding proposal from Shulgin. However, the wedding proposal was cut in the Moscow version of the broadcast.

The third season of the show became the most popular of all three seasons shot so far at that moment. However, the songs were noted to be weaker than in the previous series. Being unhappy with that, Channel One decided to let the contestants be signed with musical producers Viktor Drobysh and Iosif Prigozhin in the end. Viktor Drobysh scouted Kireev, Golubev and Barsukov to create the group K.G.B. and invited Yaroslavskaya, Ortman, Veber and Krainova to form the girlband Tootsie.

Contestant	Age	Origin	Episode of elimination	Place finished
Nikita Malinin	22	Moscow	Final	Winner
Aleksandr Kireev	22	Alushta	Final	Runner-up
Yulia Mikhalchik	18	Slantsy	Final	3rd
Svetlana Svetikova	19	Moscow	Semi-final	4th
Ruslan Kurik	23	Jūrmala	Semi-final	5th
Irina Ortman	25	Semipalatinsk	Gala 12	6th
Dmitry Golubev	18	Ivanovo	Gala 11	7th
Lesya Yaroslavskaya	22	Severomorsk	Gala 10	8th
Roman Barsukov	19	Tulun	Gala 9	9th
Sofiya Kuzmina	18	Moscow	Gala 8	10th
Mariya Veber	16	Mytishchi	Gala 7	11th
Oleg Dobrynin	27	Moscow	Gala 6	12th
Irina Zhelnova	26	Ulyanovsk	Gala 5	13th
Anastasia Krainova	20	Gvardeysk	Gala 4	14th
Nikolay Slichenko Jr.	17	Moscow	Gala 3	15th
Ksenia Valeeva	21	Kursk	Gala 2	16th

Producer: Alexander Shulgin

=== Fourth season (Early 2004) ===
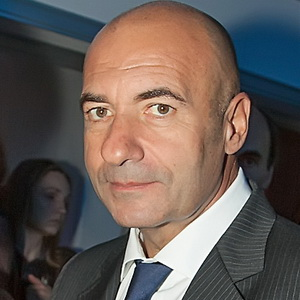
Igor Krutoy led the fourth season of the show.

The fourth season of the show was led by Igor Krutoy, one of the founders of New Wave. However, Viktor Drobysh and Igor Nikolaev were also involved in the creative direction of the season as Krutoy could not take the heavy workload on his own. Initially, Evgeniy Orlov was supposed to work together with Krutoy as a co-producer, but after a dispute between the two, Krutoy took the leadership of the season on himself without Orlov. It was the first season that the veto right for producers was used, as Krutoy saved Irina Dubtsova during the ninth concert.

Unlike previous seasons, the fourth season had 18 contestants instead of 16. A few contestants were already known prior to the show, including Dominik Joker, Timati, Edita Piekha’s grandson Stas Piekha and Irina Dubtsova, who had sung in the girl group Devochki. Similar to the two previous seasons, almost all performances used lip-sync. Ksenia Sobchak had auditioned for this season of Fabrika Zvyozd, but did not make it past the auditions.

The show started on 12 March and finalised its season on 11 June 2004 with a concert in the Olympic Arena. For winning the season, Dubtsova received a Peugeot cabriolet, an album and two music videos. She was also allowed to represent Russia at New Wave that same year. Zatsepin received a car, an album and two music videos. For finishing third, Piekha received an album, two music videos and a motorbike. Krutoy and Drobysh also awarded special prizes to Aleksa, who received the opportunity to record a studio album, Yuriy Titov and Banda, who received an album and a music video, and Ksenia Larina, who received a microphone.

The show came under fire in April 2004 after two contestants had an intimate relationship and performed sexual acts live on television. Earlier, the show had published a promotional photoshoot in which the contestants had posed naked.

15-year-old Aleksa from Donetsk became the most widely discussed participant of the fourth season. Aleksa showed herself non-participative at several times, hiding from guest star Lara Fabian by climbing underneath her bed. In the house, she pursued a romantic relationship with Timati, which was widely discussed in the press. Meanwhile, the season attracted media attention when the boyfriend of Irina Dubtsova proposed to her during one of the concerts and their wedding took place mid-season.

Ratmir Shishkov was the first Fabrika Zvyozd contestant to die after being killed in a car crash at the age of 18 in March 2007.

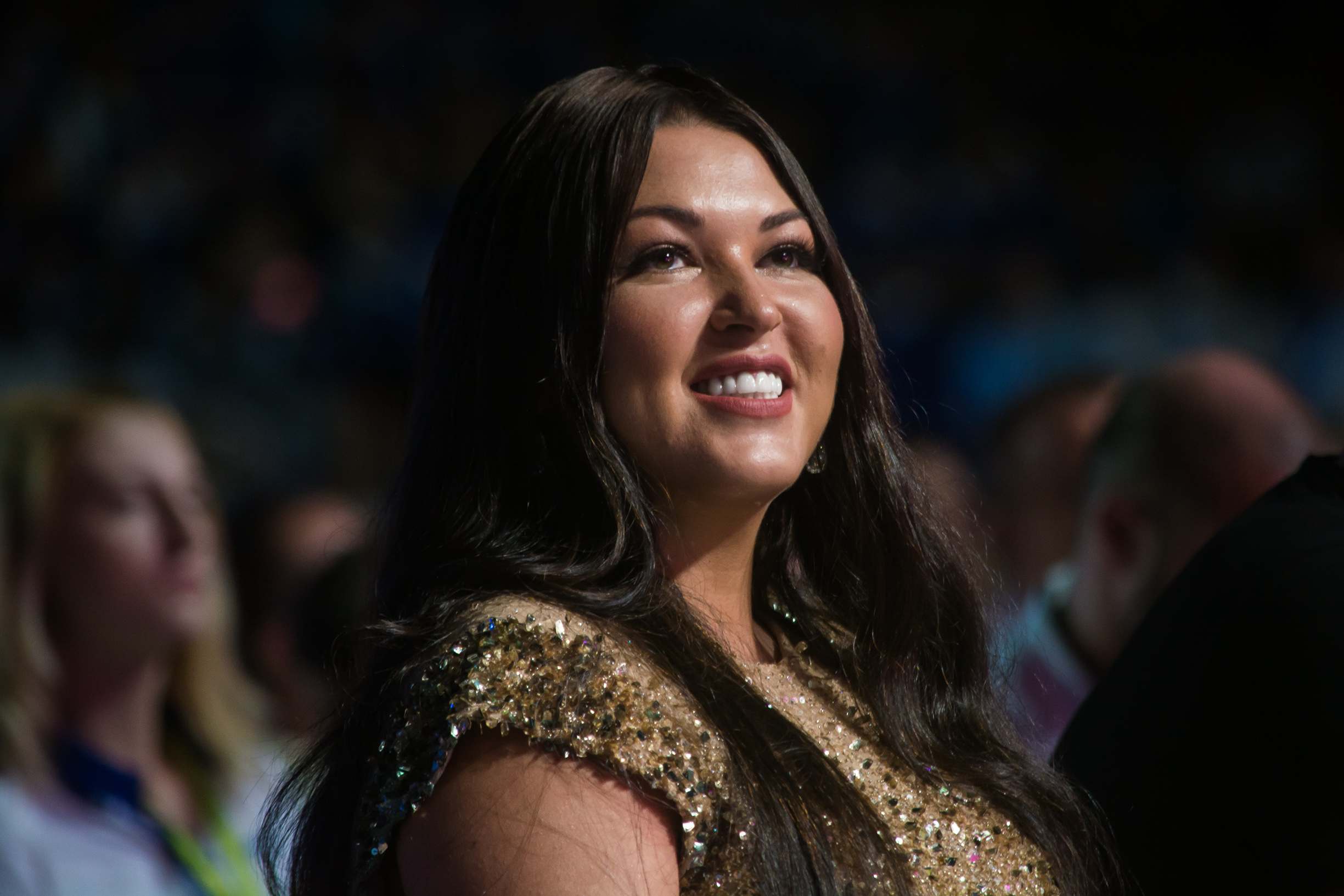
Irina Dubtsova (pictured 2016) won season 4 of Fabrika Zvyozd.

Contestant	Age	Origin	Episode of elimination	Place finished
Irina Dubtsova	22	Volgograd	Final	Winner
Anton Zatsepin	21	Segezha	Final	Runner-up
Stas Piekha	23	Saint Petersburg	Final	3rd
Aleksa	15	Donetsk	Final	4th
Yuriy Titov	17	Moscow	Final	5th
Timati	20	Moscow	Final	6th
Ksenia Larina	17	Moscow	Final	7th
Anastasia Kochetkova	15	Moscow	Final	8th
Evgeniya Volkonskaya	20	Vienna	Gala 12	9th
Ratmir Shishkov	15	Moscow	Gala 11	10th
Dominik Joker	23	Odesa	Gala 10	11th
Victoria Bogoslavskaya	17	Kharkiv	Gala 8	12th
Nadya Igoshina	15	Amurskaya	Gala 7	13th
Ivan Breusov	22	Taraz	Gala 6	14th
Nataliya Polyanskaya	17	Moscow	Gala 5	15th
Yaroslav Illarionov	19	Moscow	Gala 4	16th
Nataliya Korshunova	17	Moscow	Gala 3	17th
Anton Paul	22	Moscow	Gala 2	18th

Producer: Igor Krutoy

=== Fifth season (Late 2004) ===
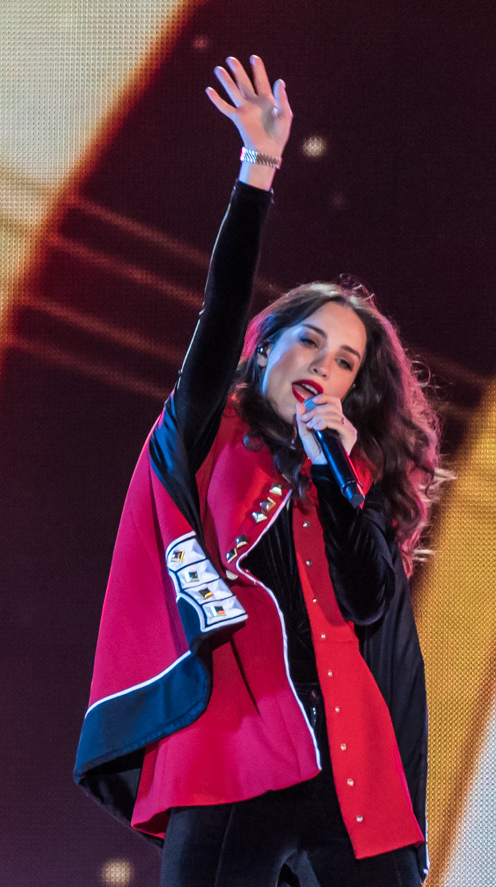
Victoria Dayneko (pictured 2018) won the season 5 of Fabrika Zvyozd.

Contestant	Age	Origin	Episode of elimination	Place finished
Victoria Dayneko	17	Kirovskiy	Final	Winner
Ruslan Masyukov	21	Tver	Final	Runner-up
Mikhail Veselov	25	Moscow	Final	3rd
Natalia Podolskaya	22	Mogilev	Final	3rd
Yulianna Karaulova	16	Moscow	Final	5th
Elena Kukarskaya (Elena Sergeevna)	20	Tyumen	Final	5th
Aleksandra Balakireva	17	Moscow	Final	5th
Miguel	22	Khimki	Final	5th
Irson Kudikova	22	Moscow	Final	5th
Darya Klushnikova	14	Voronezh	Gala 10	10th
Mike Mironenko	17	Magdeburg	Gala 9	11th
Konstantin Legostaev	28	Leningrad	Gala 8	12th
Lerika Golubeva	23	Šiauliai	Gala 7	13th
Andrey Shumskiy	26	Voronezh	Gala 6	14th
Aksinya Verzhak	17	Rostov-on-Don	Gala 4	15th
Elena Kaufman	22	Moscow	Gala 3	16th
Rodion Zabolotskiy (Roger)	22	Yermak	Gala 2	17th
Kirill Garnik	21	Odesa	Gala 1	18th

Producers: Alla Pugacheva, Igor Matvienko, Maxim Fadeev

=== Sixth season (2006) ===
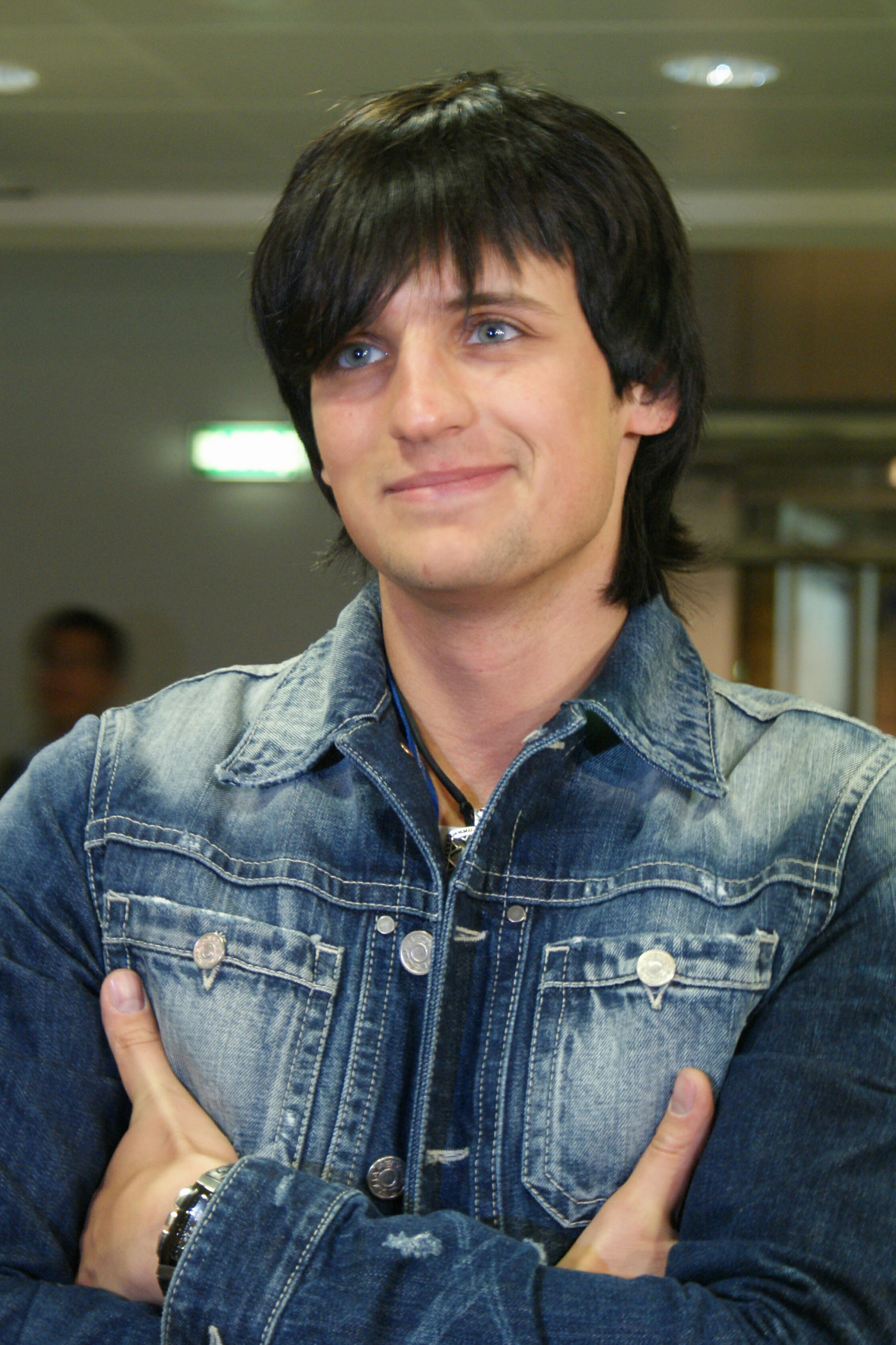
Dmitry Koldun won season 6 of Fabrika Zvyozd.

Contestant	Age	Residence	Episode of elimination	Show Ranking	Original Ranking
Dmitry Koldun	20	Minsk	Final	Winner	Runner-up
Arseniy Borodin	17	Barnaul	Final	Runner-up	
Zara	22	St. Petersburg	Final	3rd	10th
Prokhor Chaliapin	22	Moscow	Final	4th	6th
Alexandra Gurkova	17	Samara	Final	5th	Winner
Roman Arkhipov	21	Moscow	Gala 14	6th	
Denis Petrov	21	Mozdok	Gala 13	7th	
Viktoria Kolesnikova	17	Nizhniy Novgorod	Gala 12	8th	
Sogdiana Fedorinskaya	22	Tashkent	Gala 11	9th	3rd
Mila Kulikova	21	Moscow	Gala 10	10th	
Aleksey Korzin	19	Apatity	Gala 9	11th	
Anastasiya Shevchenko	21	Rostov-on-Don	Gala 8	12th	
Sabrina	17	Rostov-on-Don	Gala 5	13th	17th
Yuliya Lysenko	16	Moscow	Gala 4	14th	
Olha Voronina	23	Dnipropetrovsk	Gala 3	15th	
Aleksey Khvorostyan	22	Moscow	Gala 2	16th (Note: Although Khvorostyan had won the televoting of the second reporting concert, he decided to give up his place to Sogdiana to be eliminated in her place. Khorostyan later returned in the programme as a contestant, but withdrew after one concert due to an injury.)	
Arina Ryzhenkova	18	Moscow	Gala 1	17th	

Producer: Viktor Drobysh

=== Seventh season (2007) ===
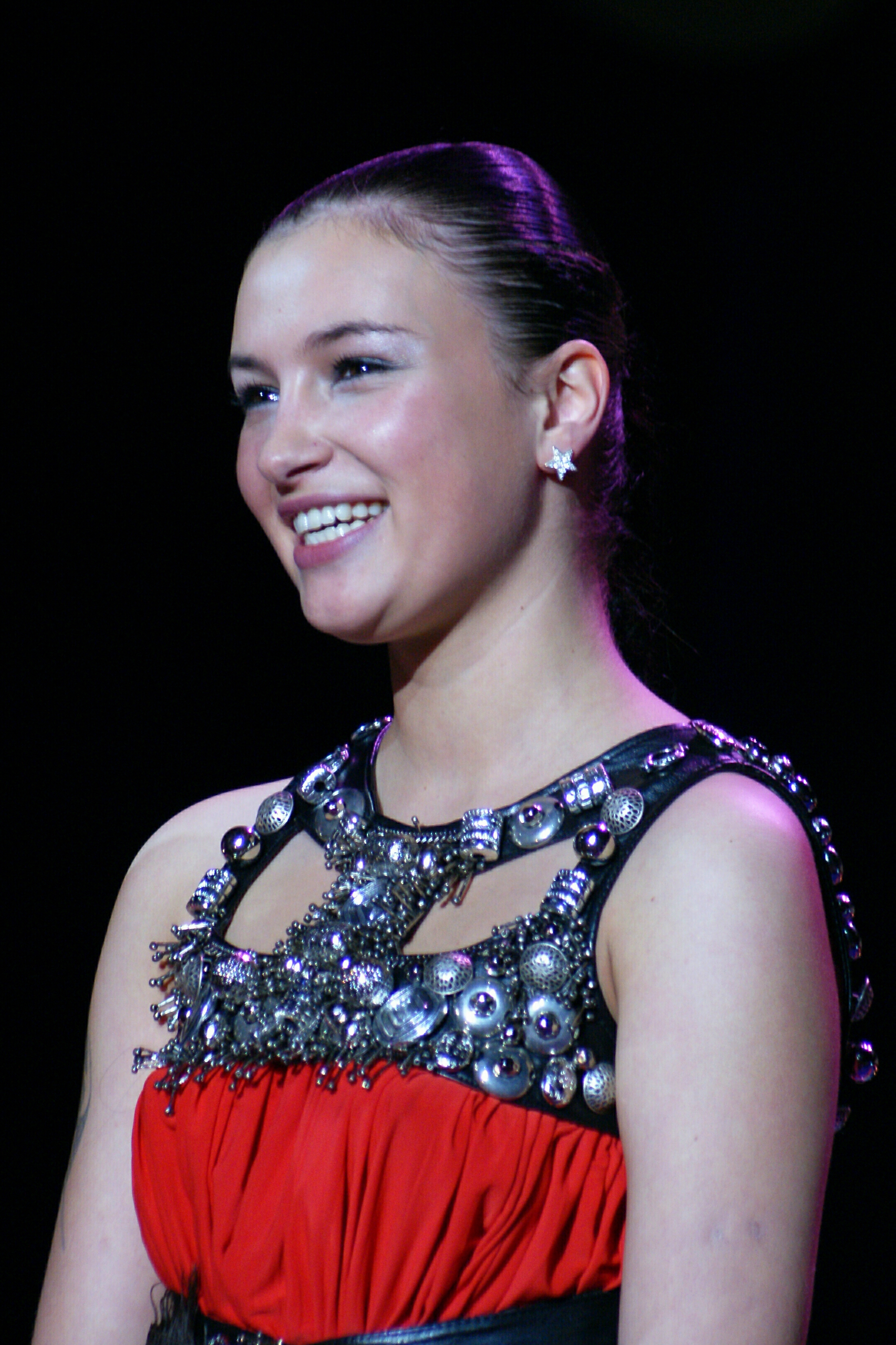
Anastasiya Prikhodko won season 7 of Fabrika Zvyozd.

The seventh season was sponsored by singer Alla Pugacheva, together with Maxim Galkin and Verka Serduchka.

Contestant	Age	Origin	Episode of elimination	Show Ranking	Original Ranking
Anastasia Prikhodko	20	Kyiv	Final	1st	9th
Mark Tishmann	28	Makhachkala	Final	2nd	2nd
Tatyana Bogacheva	22	Sebastopol	Final	3rd	1st
Vlad Sokolovskiy	15	Moscow	Final	4th	8th
Artyom Ivanov	21	Cherkasy	Final	5th	6th
Sergey Ashikhmin	20	Arkhangelsk	Final	6th	4th
Dakota	17	Minks	Final	7th	13th
Korneliya Mango	21	Astrakhan	Final	8th	3rd
Nataliya Tumshevits	20	Riga	Gala 12	9th	11th
Yulia Parshuta	19	Sochi	Gala 11	10th	7th
Dmitry Bikbaev	19	Ussurisyk	Gala 10	11th	10th
Georgiy Ivashenko (Pups)	18	Leningradskaya	Gala 8	12th	12th
Ekaterina Tsypina	21	Ufa	Gala 6	13th	5th
Anna Kolodko	17	Moscow	Gala 5	14th	15th
Aleksei Svetlov	27	Moscow	Gala 2	15th	14th
Phil Young	18	Belgorod	Gala 1	16th	16th

Spares:

- Elena Mizuk
- Vitaliy Chirva
- Leonid Panov
- Yulia Zemskaya

Producers: Konstantin Meladze, Valery Meladze

=== All stars season (2011) ===
On March 12, 2011, Channel One debuted an eight-week all-stars season of the show, called Fabrika Zyozd. Vozvryashchenie (Фабрика звёзд. Возвращение, literally Fabrika Zyozd. The return). It was not strictly competition of new talent, but rather a competition between earlier graduates and finalists from previous Fabrika Zyozd seasons.

The eighth season included four composers that had previously produced a season of the show: Igor Matvienko (one and five), Igor Krutoy (four), Viktor Drobysh (four and six), and Konstantin Meladze (seven). Each composer had three acts that they had previously produced for. As a result of Alexander Shulgin and Maxim Fadeev's non-participation, there were no competing acts from the second and third season of the show.

During the final, only the top three results were given alongside a Producer's Award, which was determined by the producers themselves. The producers were not allowed to vote for their own acts. Drobysh and Matvienko voted for Mark Tishmann, Meladze voted for Irina Dubtsova, and Krutoy voted for Chelsea.

The show received criticism for its judging panel, which at one moment drew straws to make a decision with regards to the elimination of one of the nominated contestants.

Contestant	Original series	Producer	Episode of elimination	Place finished
Victoria Dayneko	5	Igor Matvienko	Final	Winner
Chelsea (Note: Consisting of season 6 contestants Arseniy Borodin, Denis Petrov, Aleksey Korzin and Roman Arkhipov.)	6	Viktor Drobysh	Final	Runner-up
Irina Dubtsova	4	Igor Krutoy	Final	3rd
Mark Tishmann	7	Konstantin Meladze	Final	Producer's Award
Fabrika	1	Igor Matvienko	Final	Finalist
Dominik Joker	4	Igor Krutoy	Final	Finalist
Zara	6	Viktor Drobysh	Final	Finalist
Vlad Sokolovskiy	7	Konstantin Meladze	Final	Finalist
Natalia Podolskaya	5	Viktor Drobysh (Note: Podolskaya was originally mentored by Alla Pugacheva in the fifth season, but later worked at Drobysh's production company.)	7th concert	9th
Korni	1	Igor Matvienko	5th concert	10th
Anastasiya Kochetnikova	4	Igor Krutoy	4th concert	11th
Yin-Yang	7	Konstantin Meladze	2nd concert	12th

=== Fabrika Zvyozd: Russia-Ukraine (2012) ===
In 2012, there was a continuation of the 2011 project called Star Factory: Russia-Ukraine, in which the best graduates of the Russian and Ukrainian versions of the "Factory" competed.

National Team of Russia

- Polina Gagarina
- Victoria Dayneko
- Dominik Joker
- Dmitriy Koldun
- Vlad Sokolovskiy

National Team of Ukraine

- Max Barskih
- Eva Bushmina
- DiO.filmy
- Stas Shurins
- Erika

Producers: Igor Matvienko, Maxim Fadeev, Igor Krutoy, Viktor Drobysh, Konstantin Meladze, Natalia Mohylevska

=== Tenth season (2017) ===
After a hiatus from 2012 to 2017, a new 10th season was launched on Muz-TV. The premiere took place on September 2, 2017 [13]. The main show ran on Saturdays with diaries of the project broadcast on weekdays from Monday to Friday at three time slots per day. The show would be rebroadcast on Saturdays and Sundays on the alternative U channel (repetitions of the reporting concerts are broadcast on Saturdays at 11:00 and on Sundays at 22:00 on the "U" channel (Ю in Russian).

- Andrey Beletskiy
- Radoslava Boguslavskaya
- Elvira Brashchenkova
- Maria Budnitskaya
- Samvel Vardanyan
- Lolita Voloshina
- Daniil Danilevskiy
- Marta Zhdanuyk
- Elman Zeynalov
- Vladimir Idiatullin
- Nikita Kuznetsov
- Zinaida Kupriyanovich (Zina Kupriyanovich)
- Anna Saltykova (Anna Mun)
- Daniil Ruvinskiy
- Ulyana Sinetskaya
- Evgeniy Trofimov
- Gusel Khasanova

Producer: Victor Drobysh

== Criticism, incidents and scandals ==
Throughout and especially after its runtime, Fabrika Zvyozd has received a large number of criticism. Russian composer and rock singer Alexander Gradsky was an early critic of the show, as well as Diana Arbenina.

=== Accusations of viewer deception ===
Several past fabrikanty and viewers have accused the show of being fake. In 2012, season two producer Maxim Fadeev revealed that Yelena Terleyeva had actually won the season but the producers preferred that Polina Gagarina would be crowned as the winner as she was "bright, prideful and spoke several languages".

2006 winner Dmitry Koldun said that producers initiated fights between contestants in the house. Next to that, Koldun stated that there had been only one vocal class in the whole sixteen weeks he spent at Fabrika Zvyozd, and that the producers used fragments of that one class throughout the series to deceive viewers that there were regular classes. Rita Dakota, who finished fourth in the seventh series, called the house "a prison" and said everything about the house they lived in was fake. During the live final of the sixth season, producer Viktor Drobysh promised all five finalists to give them 100,000 rubles (equivalent to $4,800.86 in 2021) each, but in the end, he did not pay.

In season six, a contestant named Prokhor Chaliapin made heads turn, telling audiences that he was a descendant of Feodor Chaliapin. In the end, this didn't turn out to be true. In 2013, it was revealed that Prokhor was neither a Chaliapin nor a Prokhor as his real name was revealed to be Andrei Zakharenkov. However, prior to applying to Fabrika Zvyozd, Zakharenkov had legally changed his name to Prokhor Chaliapin.

The show has received criticism for its extensive use of recordings, including for the contestants that took part. Most of the songs that were performed on the stage were lip-synced with prerecorded and edited vocals.

=== Accusations of nepotism ===
Fabrika Zvyozd has also received criticism for nepotism. Several contestants have been said to have been admitted to the show based on the fact that they had connections to the producers at that time.

Yulia Savicheva, who was a fabrikant in 2003, publicly admitted that she was promised a place on the show by producer Maxim Fadeev as they knew each other from previous efforts.

In the third season of 2003, one of the finalists of the show, Yulia Mikhailchik was revealed to be a romantic relationship with the season's producer Alexander Shulgin since already before the show. During the show, Shulgin gave her more solo songs than any other contestant.

=== Poor treatment of contestants ===
In the fourth season of 2004, there was a food restriction on several female contestants who had started to gain weight.

In season 7, Rita Dakota was told "not to cry" and "not to downpour the mood in the house" after a family member had suddenly passed away. Dakota also spoke of a female contestant being harassed by other contestants for her skin colour and that the producers did not do anything about this.

In the tour that followed the sixth and seventh series, artists were reportedly underpaid and had to sustain in poor conditions. Several times, there was no place for the artists to sleep on tour and the tour managers did not provide the artists with food. Despite selling out large stadiums, the artists earned as little as 50$ a day. Several artists had gone on a strict diet to save money from the tour. The sleeping venues were often the cheapest hostels in the visited city. At one stage, the 2006 cohort resided in a drug clinic due to lack of hotel space. The 2007 cohort reportedly once slept in a psychiatric hospital and once on the floor of a shop.
