= Prokhor Chaliapin =

Russian singer (born 1983)

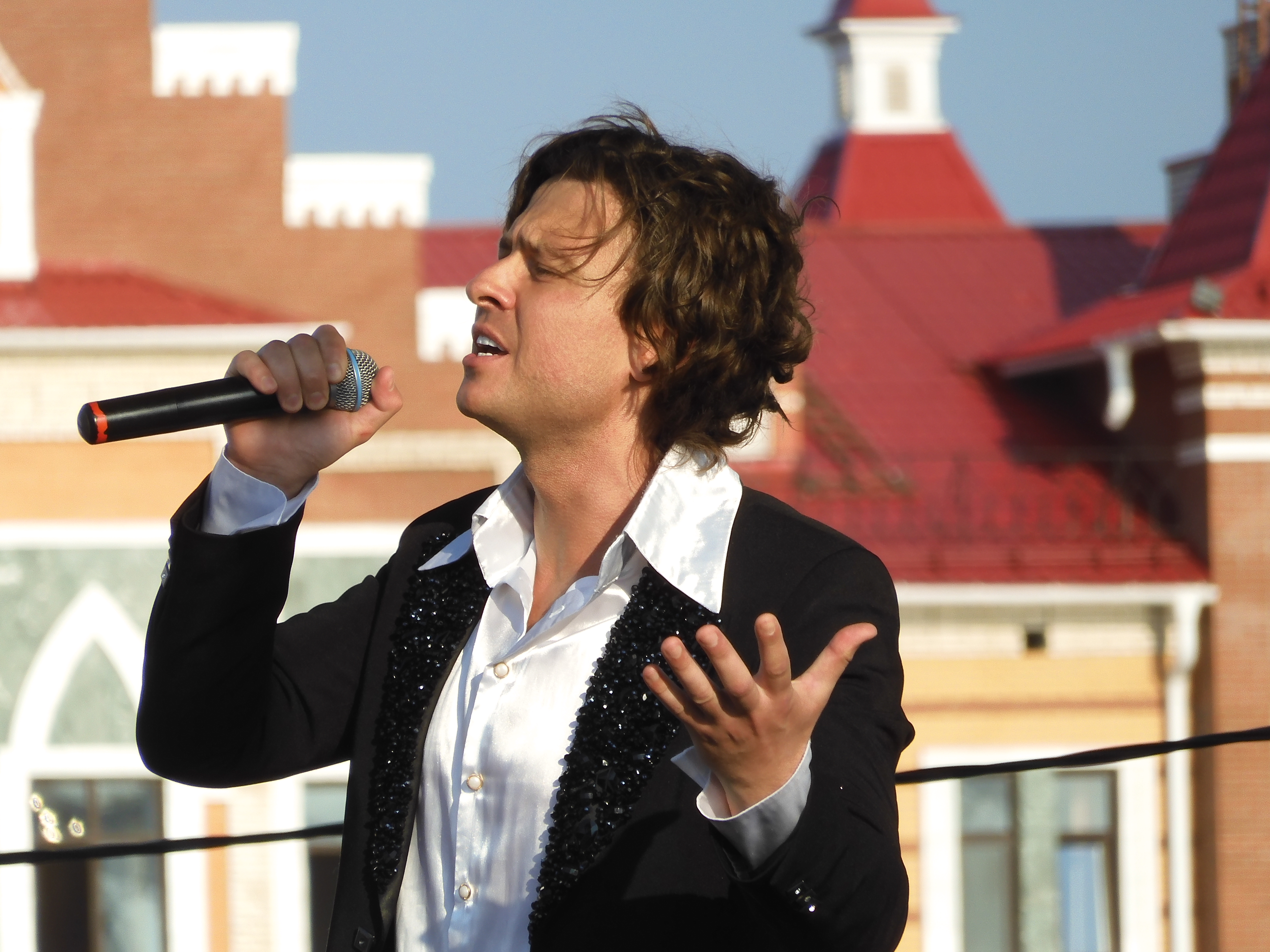
- Chaliapin in 2022
- Born: Andrei Andreevich Zakharenkov; 26 November 1983 (age 42); Volgograd. RSFSR, USSR
- Occupations: Singer; actor; weather presenter; socialite; television personality; songwriter
- Years active: 1991–present
- Spouses: Inna Shevchenko (divorced) Larisa Kopenkina (m. 2013; div. 2015) Tanya Davies (m. 2021; died 2021)
- Musical career
- Genres: Contemporary folk music, Russian romance
- Website: Official website

Prokhor Andreevich Chaliapin (Russian: Про́хор Андре́евич Шаля́пин; born as Andrei Andreevich Zakharenkov Russian: Андре́й Андре́евич Захаре́нков; born 26 November 1983 in Volgograd) is a Russian singer, socialite, media personality and television presenter. Chaliapin first became known as a finalist on the sixth season of the Russian musical reality programme Fabrika Zvyozd. Prokhor is married with Olga Washurina.

== Early life ==
Chaliapin was born as Andrei Zakharenkov in Volgograd on 26 November 1983. His mother was a cook, and his father, a steelworker. He was the only child of Andrei Ivanovich Zakharenkov and Elena Ivanovna Kletskina, who was eighteen at the birth of her son. Chaliapin's paternal grandparents hailed from Gorky Oblast and Smolensk Oblast, while his maternal grandparents came from Arel'sk, Trubchevsky District, Bryansk Oblast and Kalynivka, Korosten Raion, Zhytomyr Oblast, Ukraine. His maternal grandmother was an ethnic Pole. Three out of his four great-grandfathers were killed in World War II, of which two on the Eastern Front during the Great Patriotic War.

In many interviews, Chaliapin acknowledged that he endured a challenging childhood due to his father's problems with alcoholism and schizophrenia. His parents divorced when he was nine. As a result of a then deteriorating relationship with his mother and new step-father, Chaliapin moved in with his paternal grandparents. In 1996, his maternal grandmother and aunt were murdered in their apartment in Volgograd; Chaliapin was the first one to discover the murder scene. Initially, charges were pressed against both his parents, leaving Chaliapin to be sent to an orphanage. However, after three days, charges were dropped and his mother returned home. A few months later, Chaliapin became involved in a serious car accident.

Chaliapin was involved in music from a young age. He started playing bayan and entered a local music school, but was expelled after a few years. In the fifth grade, he became a soloist of the Russian folk band "Vyunok" and moved from the regular school to the Central School of Art at the Volgograd branch of the Samara Academy of Arts and Culture. At the age of 15, Chaliapin auditioned to enter the State Music and Pedagogical Institute named after M. Ippolitov-Ivanov at the department of "Folk singing". Chaliapin was enrolled in the programme with a full scholarship. With this, he also moved to Moscow.

After graduating from the institute, he applied to the same department at the Gnessin Musical College, where he managed to enroll. His tuition fees were sponsored.

== Music career ==
=== Early career ===
From 1991 to 1996, Chaliapin was known as a child singer and as one of the soloists of the vocal show group "Jam", where he sang along with Irina Dubtsova, Tanya Zaikina (Monokini) and Sofia Taih. With the show group, he performed at different events in Volgograd, where the group enjoyed local popularity. Chaliapin also took part in several television recordings with the group. In 1996, he wrote his first song "Nerealniy son".

After moving to Moscow, Chaliapin applied to the casting of Morning Star. He was eventually asked to appear as a replacement in one broadcast after a boy fell ill in 1999. At the broadcast, he sang "Nerealniy son" and "Ne otrekayutsa lyuba", taking the third place.

Chaliapin subsequently took part in various musical competitions. In 2005, at the contest "Star Chance", held in New York, he sang the song "Odna kalyna" by Sofia Rotaru in Ukrainian and took the third place.

=== Nationwide breakthrough ===
In 2005, Chaliapin officially changed his name to Prokhor Andreevich Chaliapin. In the same year he released his debut album Volshebnaya skripka, which was produced by Viktor Drobysh.

Chaliapin had unsuccessfully auditioned for the first, third and fifth season of Fabrika Zvyozd. In the fifth season, Chaliapin made it to the last audition round, where he was personally rejected by Alla Pugacheva, who told him that letting Chaliapin on the show would be sycophantic. Chaliapin eventually became a contestant in the sixth series of the show, which was under moderation of Drobysh.

For his frivolous behaviour and one-liners, Chaliapin quickly became an audience favourite and a widely discussed participant. His most famous one-liner became "You are stars, but I am a legend!" (Вы – звёзды, а я – легенда!). He also attracted negative attention by posing as the descendant of the famous opera singer Feodor Chaliapin. Chaliapin was nominated four times, more than any other contestant, but was saved each time. Twice, Chaliapin was saved by public vote, once by contestants' vote and once by the veto of the producer. In the end of the competition, Chaliapin reached the final, finishing fourth.

=== After Fabrika Zvyozd ===
After Fabrika Zvyozd, Prokhor Chaliapin's producer was Victor Drobysh. Parting with Drobysh in 2007 was held with mutual accusations and scandals.

After the end of the Fabrika Zvzyod tour, Prokhor Chaliapin began to conduct an active solo tour activity, including abroad. In 2008, his first video for the song "Serdtse.com" was released. In the same year, the singer graduated from the Gnessin State Musical College. His diploma was dedicated to the use of Russian folk songs in the work of Feodor Chaliapin.

In 2011, Chaliapin portrayed Boris Shtokolov in the television series Zhukov. In 2013, Chaliapin released his second album Legenda. In 2014, he starred as recurring character Lyova in the television series Kurazh.

In 2019, Chaliapin performed at the festive concert dedicated to second anniversary of the complete destruction of chemical weapons in Russia. During this concert in Volgograd, Chaliapin held a short speech in which he said he wished for a peaceful world without war. For his performance, he earned the medal "For Cooperation in the Field of Chemical Disarmament".

In 2021, Chaliapin was a guest on a special broadcast of Hello, Andrey!, hosted by Andrey Malakhov on Russia-1, dedicated to Russian folk songs.

== Television appearances ==
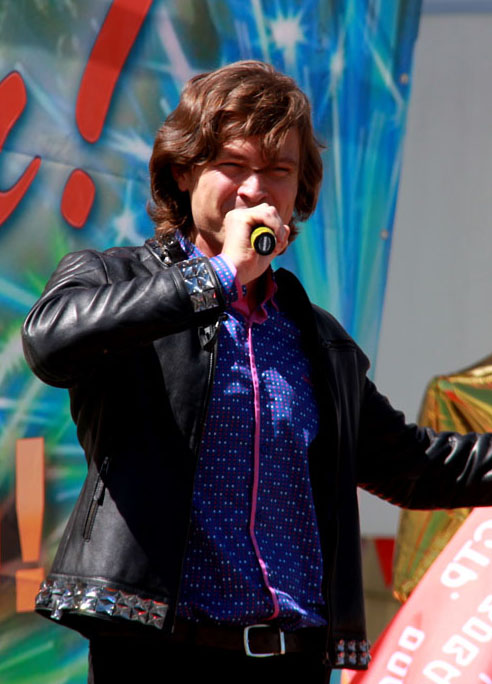
Chaliapin in 2013.

Between 2012 and 2020, Chaliapin was a regular guest of Russian sensationalist shows as Live on Air, Let Them Talk and Actually, becoming a popular and widely discussed personality in Russian yellow press. After Fabrika Zvyozd, Chaliapin first appeared in a broadcast of Live on Air in 2012, where he and his then girlfriend discussed their relationship in an unconventional manner.

In 2013, Chaliapin appeared in a broadcast in which he announced that he would marry 57-year-old business woman and media personality Larisa Kopenkina. The broadcast became a part of a media circus around the couple. In early 2015, in a broadcast of Let Them Talk, the two announced that their relationship had been fake and a PR stunt. Instead, Chaliapin announced that he had a child with another woman, model Anna Kalashnikova, which was born to the couple in March 2015. In a 2016 broadcast of Let Them Talk, where Chaliapin and Kalashnikova tried to prove that the child Kalashnikova bore was Chaliapin's, it was found that Chaliapin was 0% likely to be the child's father. The result of the DNA test led to a new media circus around Chaliapin's persona. The video in which Chaliapin receives his negative DNA test was watched more than 15 million times on YouTube.

In 2018, Chaliapin again became a popular topic in the yellow press after appearing alongside Vitalina Tsymbalyuk-Romanovskaya, the former wife of famous actor Armen Dzhigarkhanyan. This led to increased appearances of Chaliapin on sensationalist shows again. In a broadcast of New Russian Sensations in June 2019, a discussion between Tsymbalyuk-Romanovskaya and her lawyer escalated to fisticuffs, also involving Chaliapin, who tried to de-escalate the situation.

In early 2021, Chaliapin announced his temporary withdrawal from sensationalist shows, stating he needed a break and that he wanted to direct his attention on folk songs: "I'm having a small break. My head hurts from weddings, from shows. I sing folk songs now, go to do sports, I pray.". He returned on Let Them Talk in August 2021 to discuss his new marriage and featured in an unusual one-to-one interview with Andrey Malakhov on Live on Air in October 2021 after the passing of his wife.

Between 2018 and 2020, Chaliapin presented the weather forecast on NTV on weekend days. In 2018, he also debuted his own travel show, titled GoProshka on YouTube.

== Personal life ==
Chaliapin first married at the age of 18 to a classmate six years his senior, Inna Shevchenko from Kharkiv Oblast, Ukraine. They separated after one year of marriage and divorced after three years. Between 2011 and 2012, he dated singer and model Adelina Sharipova. On December 3, 2013, 30-year-old Prokhor Chaliapin married 58-year-old entrepreneur Larisa Kopenkina, whom he met in early 2013 while on holiday in Jamaica. The singer's mother was actively against the wedding. The two had an open marriage. The couple separated in late 2014 and their marriage was annulled officially in early 2015.

On December 15, 2014, Prokhor Chaliapin officially stated on the talk show Let Them Talk he was expecting a child together with then 30-year-old singer and model Anna Kalashnikova. In a release dated April 20, 2016, the results of a DNA test showed that their common child is not the biological son of Chaliapin. Their planned wedding in May 2016 was left cancelled as the couple separated. From 2018 to late 2019, Chaliapin had a companionship with pianist Vitalina Tsymbalyuk-Romanovskaya.

On 31 July 2021, Chaliapin married his third wife Tanya Davies, a 46-year-old Canadian citizen, in a secret and private ceremony in Las Vegas. The two had met in Monaco in 2019 and started dating in early 2020. The couple kept their relationship mostly outside of the public eye. She proposed to Chaliapin in late 2020. Shortly after the wedding ceremony, Chaliapin's wife fell ill with COVID-19 and was hospitalised not much later. She died as a result of complications of the illness on 25 September, less than two months after the wedding.now prohor is married with Olga Washurina.

After rumours circled around his sexuality in 2014, Chaliapin acknowledged that he "loves all people" and that he thinks that the LGBT community should be protected. He said: "I like it that everyone likes me. Hate is one step away from love. Beautiful! Love me friends. I support all people. Especially sexual minorities who need it today." He previously spoke out his support for Conchita Wurst's win at Eurovision 2014.

=== Political views ===
Chaliapin considered himself apolitical in 2021 and referred to Russia as his "house". He said that he did not see the United States as "an enemy of Russia". In the same interview, he was critical about propaganda on state channels, which dictated in his opinion that "all are to blame for our problems".

Chaliapin had lifelong musical ties with Ukraine and has performed in Ukrainian. In early 2014, he was one of the first Russian singers to visit the Revolution of Dignity in Ukraine and criticized Russian foreign policy and the increased prices for Ukrainians on gas. He was one of the very few artists to never visit or perform in Crimea or the Donbass region after 2014. On 22 February 2022, shortly before the escalation of the Russo-Ukrainian war, he called for "peace, economic stability and calmness" between Russia and Ukraine, referring to Ukraine as a "brother-country" and posting a handshake with between hands painted in the colors of each flag.

Prior to the conflict characterized by show business colleagues as "naive" and "persuadable", on the day of the 2022 Russian invasion of Ukraine, Chaliapin stated that he believed that Russia was under threat by NATO and that there was no war with Ukraine. He wrote that he previously thought that Russia had invaded Ukraine, but that his opinion changed after consuming state media.

== Discography ==
- 2005 — Volshebnaya Skripka
- 2013 — Legenda
