= Lesya Yaroslavskaya =

Russian singer (born 1981)

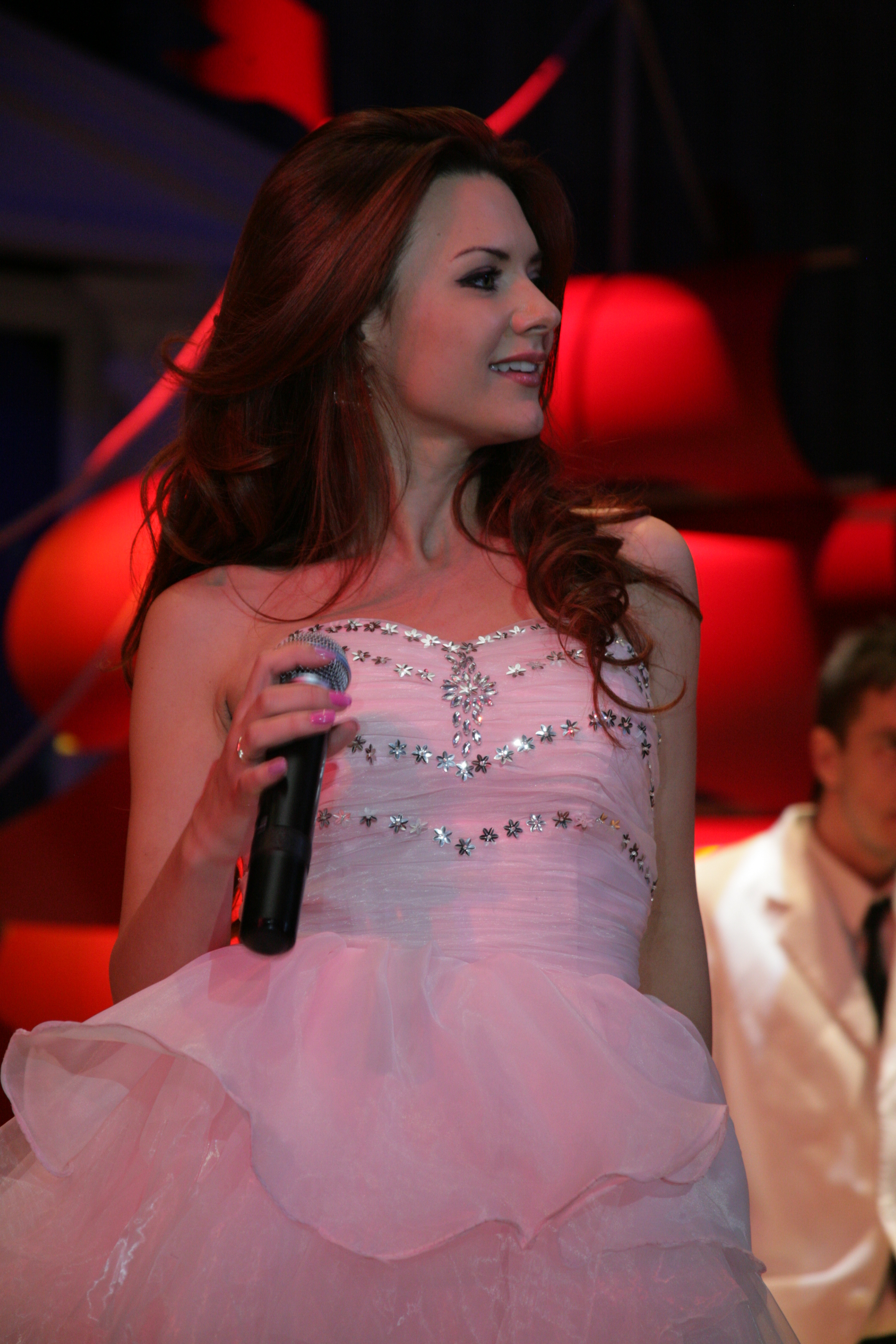
- Yaroslavskaya in 2012
- Born: Olesya Vladimirovna Yaroslavskaya; 20 March 1981 (age 45); Severomorsk, Murmansk Oblast, RSFSR, USSR
- Awards: Medal "For distinction in Service" Medal "200 Years of St. George's Cross Medal "200 Years of MIA Russia" Medal "For service in the North Caucasus"
- Musical career
- Genres: Pop, Russian pop
- Occupations: Singer, songwriter
- Years active: 2003–present

Olesya (Lesya) Vladimirovna Yaroslavskaya (Russian: Оле́ся (Ле́ся) Влади́мировна Яросла́вская; born 20 March 1981) is a Russian pop singer, lead singer of Viktor Drobysh's girls band Тootsie (2004–2012), author and performer of her own songs.

== Early life ==
Yaroslavskaya was born in the closed city of Severomorsk, where her father worked as a military officer and her mother as a music teacher. Yaroslavskaya started performing from the age of four, when she sang the song Junk Letters in the local House of Culture. At the age of seven, she and her parents moved to Naro-Fominsk. There, she started studying piano. During her teen years, she regularly took part in music festivals, including in her birth town. After finishing her secondary school, Yaroslavskaya enrolled in the Moscow Regional College of Art, specialising in pop-jazz music. Subsequently, in 2001, she entered the Institute of Modern Art, where she completed a degree in pop music.

== Career ==
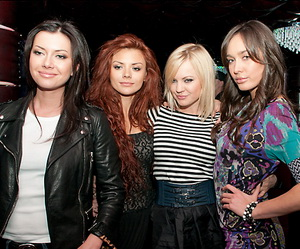
Yaroslavskaya (second from right) as part of Tootsie.

Yaroslavskaya auditioned for the third season of the Russian reality music competition Fabrika Zvyozd, where she became one of the sixteen contestants. Eventually, she finished eight overall, being eliminated in the tenth reporting concert. After the show had ended, Yaroslavskaya — alongside Irina Ortman, Mariya Veber and Anastasia Krainova — was put into a girlband which was named Tootsie. Yaroslavskaya signed a contract with producer Viktor Drobysh for seven years.

In 2004, Yaroslavskaya won the audition to become the second presenter of Dom-2 alongside Ksenia Sobchak, but she had to reject the position due to contractual obligations she had with Channel One Russia.

After the Fabrika Zvyozd tour ended, Tootsie released their first record Best, Best in August 2004, which peaked at #10 in the TopHit airplay charts. In that period, Tootsie grew out to one of the most commercially successful all-women groups in Russia. Yaroslavskaya stayed in the group until 2008, when she shortly left on maternity leave. She returned afterwards, but similarly to Ortman and Veber, Yaroslavsksya started a solo career. In 2012, the group officially disbanded.

Yaroslavskaya released her first solo record titled Not With Me in 2011, which achieved moderate radio airplay in Russia. In 2014, she released her first extended play Heart Worries through Freestyle Records. She frequently performed in front of army officers, for which she was decorated with the medal "For Service in the North Caucasus" in 2009, later with the medal "200 Years of MIA Russia", the medal "200 Years of the St. George's Cross" and the medal "For Distinction in Service" (2nd class) in 2012. In 2021, she said that she earns most of her money through teaching vocal classes in the Central School of Arts.

In 2019, Yaroslavskaya revealed that Tootsie was returning as four-piece girlband with Ortman, Veber and Rostova. The group made an appearance during Muz-TV's Golden Hits concert, where they sang Best, Best.

== Personal life ==
Yaroslavskaya married an army officer in 2002. They have a daughter, born in 2008.

== Discography ==
=== Extended plays ===
Title	Details
Heart Worries	Released: 2014; Label: Freestyle Records; Format: Digital Download

=== Singles ===
Title	Year	Peak chart positions	Album
Title	Year	RUS Airplay	Album
Not With Me	2011	315	Non-album single
Heart Worries	2012	155	Heart Worries
Be My Husband	2014	200	Non-album single
