= Viktor Drobysh =

Russian composer (born 1966)

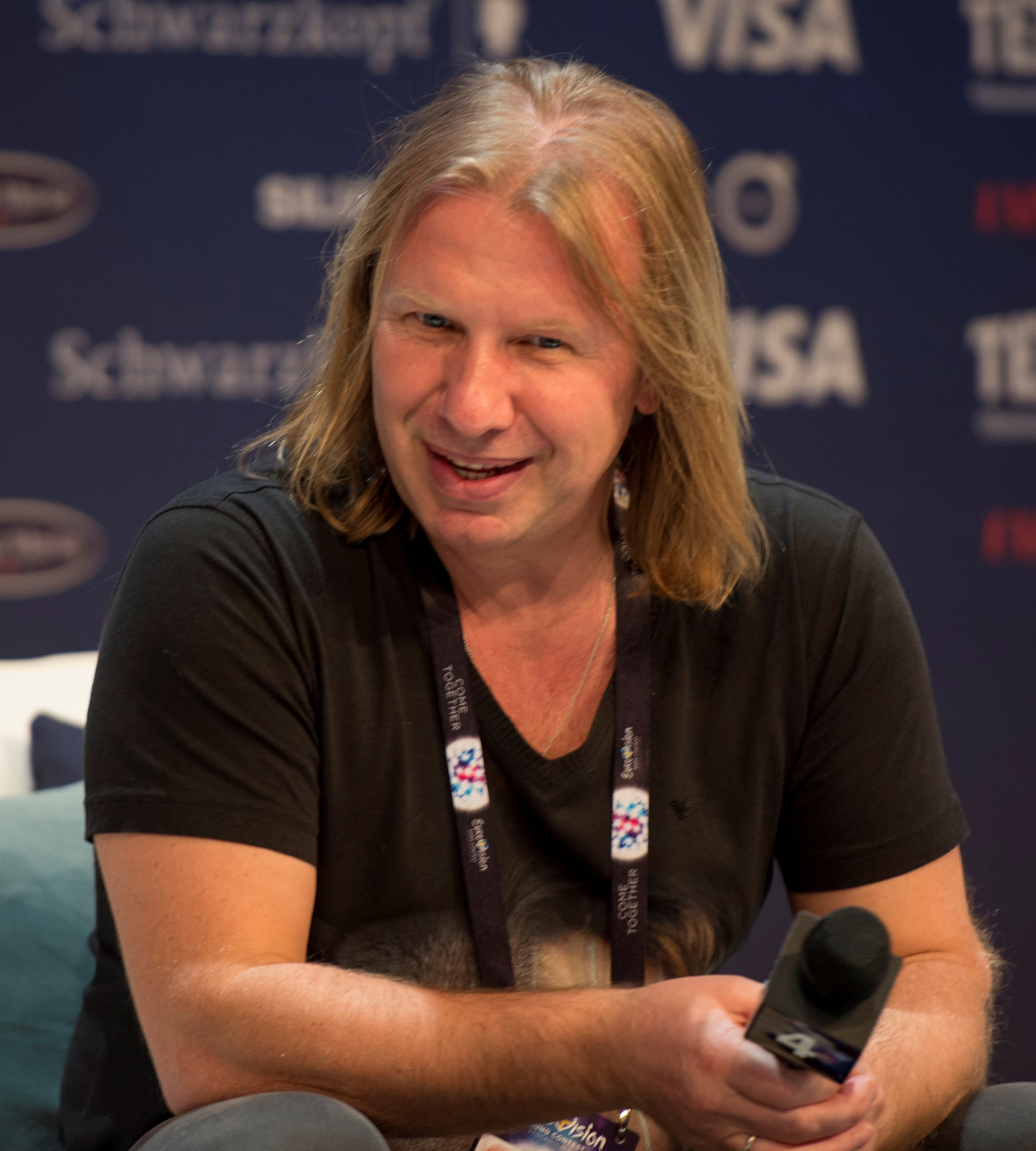
- Drobysh in 2016
- Born: June 27, 1966 (age 60); Leningrad, Russian SFSR
- Occupations: composer and producer
- Website: https://drobysh.com

Viktor Yakovlevich Drobysh (Russian: Ви́ктор Я́ковлевич Дро́быш; born June 27, 1966, Leningrad, Russian SFSR) is a Russian composer and music producer, Honored Artist of Russia (2010).

Song Author group Buranovskiye Babushki Party for Everybody, who took 2nd place at Eurovision 2012.

From 1996 he worked in Germany. After working in Germany, Drobysh moved to Finland, where he created the duet Pets.

In 2004, Drobysh participated as a co-producer in the talent show Fabrika Zvyozd of Channel One Russia. In 2006, he single-handedly led the 6th season of the project.

In August 2004, Viktor Drobysh's Producer Centre was created. It was engaged in promoting the groups Tootsie, K.G.B., Chelsea, Princessa Avenue and Ultrafiolet, as well as solo artists, such as Yulia Mikhalchik, Natalia Podolskaya, Stas Piekha, Dmitry Koldun, Zara, Avraam Russo, Sogdiana Fedorinskaya, Prokhor Chaliapin and others.
