= Irina Dubtsova =

Russian singer-songwriter and actress (born 1982)

Irina Dubtsova Ирина Дубцова
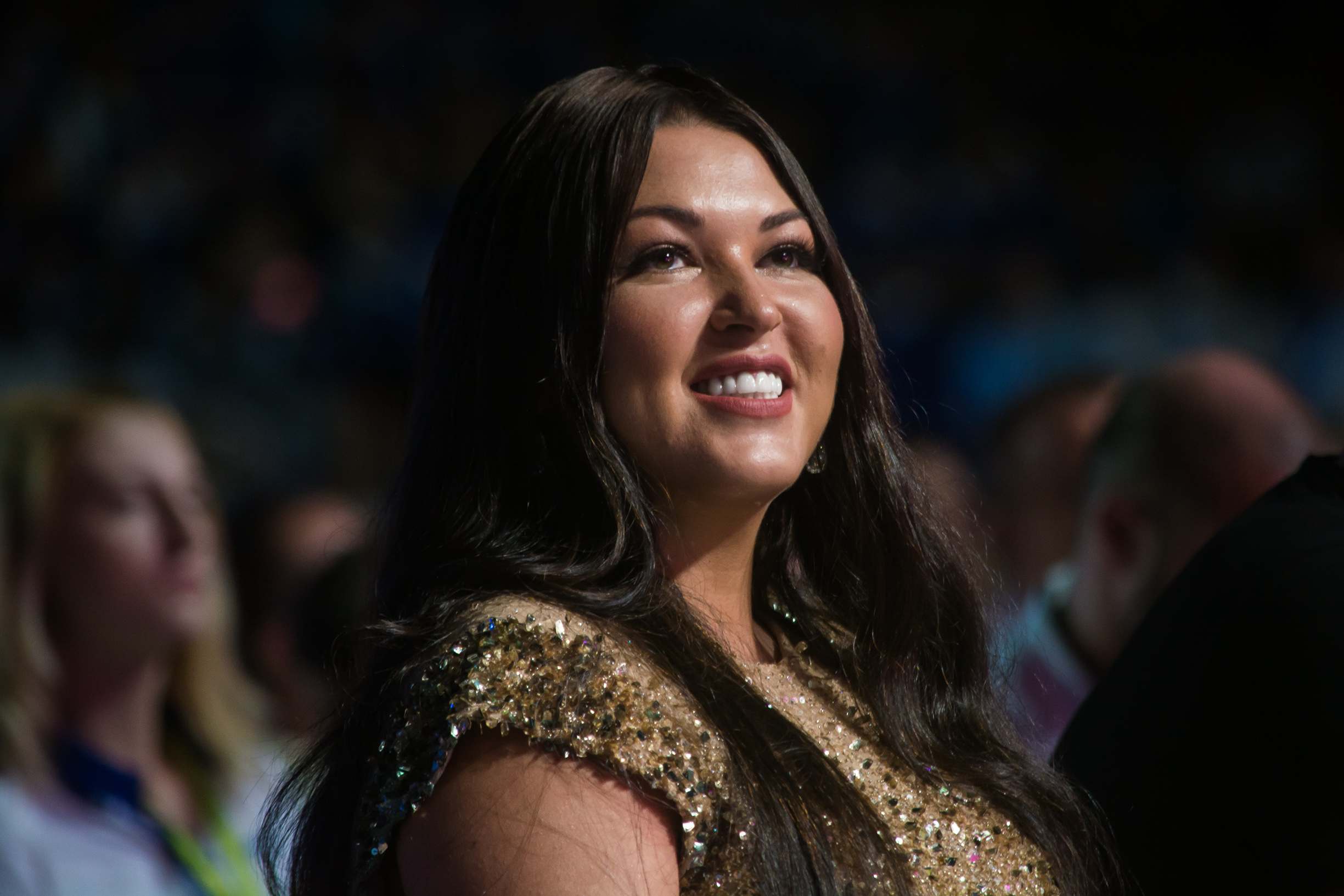
- Dubtsova in 2016

Background information
- Born: Irina Viktorovna Dubtsova (Ирина Викторовна Дубцова); 14 February 1982 (age 44); Volgograd, Russian SFSR, Soviet Union
- Genre: Pop
- Occupations: Singer, songwriter, actress
- Years active: 1999–present
- Formerly of: Devochki
- Website: irinadubcova.com

Irina Viktorovna Dubtsova (Russian: Ирина Викторовна Дубцова; born 14 February 1982) is a Russian singer, songwriter, and actress. She is the winner of fourth season of Fabrika Zvyozd (2004), released three albums until present and reached high positions in Russian music charts with several songs. As songwriter, Dubtsova wrote songs for other artist like Ani Lorak, Timati, Philipp Kirkorov, Polina Gagarina, Alsou, Zara, Slava, Sasha Gradiva, and others.

== Career ==
=== 1982–2003: Early years ===
Irina Dubtsova was fond of music since childhood. When she was 11 years old, her parents created a children's musical group Джем (translit.: Jam/Jem), which included Dubtsova. The collective has become quite popular in Volgograd. In 1999, through the friend of her father Andrey Pryazhnikov, the disc with the song "Hijo De La Luna" performed by Dubtsova came to the well-known producer Igor Matvienko, who was just recruiting the participants for a new band. The group was named Devochki (Russian: Девочки; English: "[The] Girls"), and in addition to Dubtsova, it included three more soloists: Tatyana Gerasimova, Valentina Rubtsova and Olympiada Teterich. The group was actively and unsuccessfully PR-ed in the media, and the clip for the song "Говорила мама (У-ла-ла)" ("Mom Said (U-la-la)") ranked among the best clips of MTV Russia for 2000, but Irina Dubtsova left the band before the release of the first album. After leaving the group she worked in the post of executive director at the studio "SBS – Entertainment". Anton Makarsky worked with this studio, and several of Dubtsova's songs got into his hands. Subsequently, almost all the songs for his album were written by Dubtsova. In 2001 she graduated from the Volgograd Municipal Arts Institute. P. A. Serebryakova, at specialty of Academic singing.

=== 2004–2007: Star Factory ===
On 12 March 2004 on Channel One Russia started the Season 4 of "Fabrika Zvyozd", in which Dubtsova took part. She was noted for duets with such artists and bands as Mumiy Troll, Igor Nikolayev, Bi-2, Aleksandr Ivanov, Ivanushki International, Alexander Rosenbaum, Vladimir Presnyakov Jr., and also she sang a song of her own composition "O nyom" (О нём; "About Him"). In addition, during the singer's stay at the Factory on 29 May 2004 was held Irina's wedding with Roman Chernitsyn, the soloist of the band Plazma. On 8 June the final gala concert of the "Fabrika Zvyozd" took place in the sports complex "Olimpiyskiy", at which the winners of the project were announced, and Dubtsova took the first place. As a prize, Irina received a convertible Peugeot car, recordings for a solo album and filming for three music videos, as well as the right to represent Russia at the contest of young singers New Wave 2004, in which she subsequently took the second place.

=== 2005–2011: Career beginnings ===
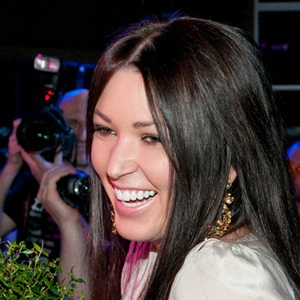
Irina Dubtsova in 2010

In February 2005, Dubtsova's debut album, named "O nyom" (О нём; "About Him"), was released.

On 3 March 2006, Irina Dubtsova gave birth to a son, who was named Artyom.

On 19 July 2007 was released a new album of Irina Dubtsova, "Vetra" (Ветра; "Winds"). It included 12 compositions written by the singer herself. At the same time, the videos for the songs "Medals" and "Winds" appeared in the rotation of the TV channel Muz-TV.

In 2008 along with Polina Gagarina she sang the song "Komu? Zachem?" (Кому? Зачем?; "To Whom? Why?"), for which a video was shot. The song became the winner of the "Muz-TV Award 2010" in the nomination "Duet of the Year". Based on the negative response about men in the song, there were rumors that the singer was getting divorced from her husband, the soloist of the group Plazma ("Slow Motion") Roman Chernitsyn, and then these rumors were confirmed.

In 2010, Irina Dubtsova, Jasmin, Alsou, Tatiana Bulanova, and Valeria Kudryavtseva recorded a children's lullaby "Spi, moyo solnyshko" (Спи, моё солнышко; "Sleep, My Sun") in support of the Pampers and UNICEF charity project "1 pack = 1 vaccine" to prevent tetanus in newborns and their mothers.

In 2011, she took part in the project "Fabrika Zvyozd. Return", where the winners of the "Fabrika Zvyozd" of different years competed. Dubtsova joined the team of producer Igor Krutoy and took the third place.

Since the end of August 2011, she has sung jingles for the radio station Retro FM.

=== 2012–present ===
In the spring of 2012 Irina performed the song "Esh', molis', lyubi" (Ешь, молись, люби; "Eat, Pray, Love"), for which the words and music she composed herself, and in April same year a video for the song was released, which was directed by Aleksandr Filatovich.

In the fall of 2012, on the Ukrainian TV channel STB, the third season of the Ukrainian version of X-Factor started, and Irina Dubtsova replaced the singer Yolka as a judge. She headed the category "Collectives", which included the trio "D-version" (5th place), duo Violetta and Anatoly (11th place), and the girl group "3D" (8th place).

In November 2012, a video for the new song "Prosti menya" (Прости меня; "Forgive me") was released.

On 1 December 2012, Irina Dubtsova in a live show of the X-Factor, performed the song "Zhivi" (Живи; "Live!") in a duet with the winner of the 2nd season of the show, Viktor Romanchenko, song which she wrote in honor of World AIDS Day.

The year 2014 began for the actress from with the show "Toch-v-Toch" on Channel One, where she acted as a participant in the project and subsequently became the winner.

On 12 March 2014, Irina Dubtsova celebrated the 10th anniversary of her solo career. On the same day, was released a new video for the duet composition with Lyubov Uspenskaya "I love him, too" (Я тоже его люблю).

Irina Dubtsova became a winner in the nomination "Beloved Judge of the Show" at the annual "Telesvezda" award (Ukraine).

On 22 July 2014, at the concert hall "Dzintari" at the international contest "New Wave 2014", Dubtsova and DJ Leonid Rudenko released a joint single "Recollect" (Вспоминать).

In the late 2014 Dubtsova competed in a Channel One project "Three Chords" (Три аккорда).

On 25 January 2015, Dubtsova presented a solo song entitled "Love Me Long" (Люби меня долго) on a big show of the Muz-TV channel, "Party Zone". On 28 March 2015 in the concert hall "Crocus City Hall" a big solo concert of Dubtsova was held, timed to the release of the new album and the 10th anniversary of creative activity, which gathered more than 6,000 spectators.

On 28 April 2016, the nominees of the annual RU.TV award became known, where Dubtsova received the nomination "The Singer of the Year". On 19 November 2016 Irina Dubtsova received her first "Golden Gramophone Award" for the single "Lyuba – Lyubov'" (Люба — Любовь). On 3 December 2016, Dubtsova becomes the Laureate of the diploma "Song of the Year" for the song "Boyfriend".

== Discography ==
Albums

- 2005: O nyom (О нём; "About Him"))
- 2007: Vetra (Ветра; "Winds")

Compilations

- 2008: O lyubvi (О любви (лучшие песни); "About Love (best songs)")

=== EP ===
- 2020: TBA

=== In the group "Girls" ===
- 1999 – "I want to be a bird"
- 2000 – "Mom said (U-la-la)"

=== Solo ===
Year	Clip	Producer	Album
2004	"About him"	unknown	"About him"
2005	"How are you there"	Alexander Igudin	"About him"
2006	"Medals"	Georgiy Toidze	"Wind"
2007	"Wind"	Alexander Igudin	"Wind"
2009	"To whom?" Why? " (Feat, Polina Gagarina )	Alexey Golubev	"About Me" (P. Gagarina's album)
2010	"Sleep, my sun" (feat Jasmine, Tatiana Bulanova, Lera Kudryavtseva, Alsou )	Alexey Golubev	TBA
2010	"Let her go" (feat Olga Lima)	Sergey Tkachenko	TBA
2012	"Eat. Pray. Love »	Alexander Filatovich	TBA
2012	"Forgive me"	Alexander Filatovich	TBA
2013	"The Game of Shadows" (feat. Brandon Stone)	Alexander Filatovich	TBA
2014	"I love him too" (feat, Love of Assumption )	Alexey Golubev	TBA
2014	"To Remember" (feat. DJ Leonid Rudenko )	Alexey Golubev	TBA
2015	"Love me for a long time"	Maria Skobeleva	TBA
2015	Lyuba-Love	Alexander Filatovich	TBA
2016	Boyfriend	Alexander Filatovich	TBA
2017	"Moscow-Neva" (feat. DJ Leonid Rudenko )	Serghey Gray	TBA

=== As featured artist ===
==== Video Clip ====
- 2000 – Ivanushki International – Why do you girls love the fair-haired (in the "Girls" group)

==== Artist ====
Throughout her career Irina practiced writing songs for other performers:

- Philip Kirkorov : Heart in 1000 candles, He is your illusion
- Timati : Do not be insane
- Glory : There was not, Without rules, Whiskey without ice
- Anton Makarsky : To admire, But she loved him, No you at home, Who you are, etc.
- Tatyana Kotova : He
- Zara : Forgive me
- Emin : Angel-demon (co-authored)
- Alsou : Where I am
- Polina Gagarina : No offense, Little things in life, To whom? Why ?, I'm to blame (in co-authorship)
- Teona Dolnikov : It's not true, Confrontation
- Ani Lorak : Without you
- Dilnaz Ahmadiyeva : No more
- Sasha : If you want
- Julia Obraztsova : The Ring, The Winter One, Refuse
