= Victoria Dayneko =

Russian singer, songwriter, and actress (born 1987)

Victoria Dayneko Виктория Дайнеко
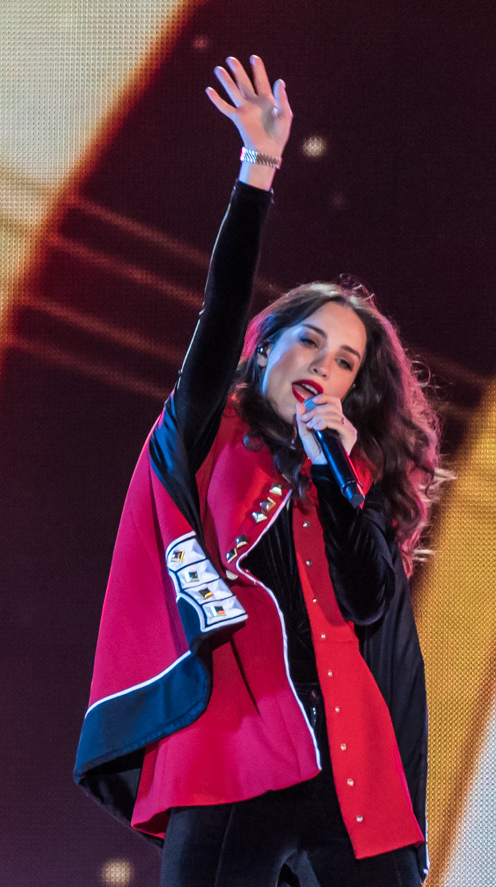
- In 2018

Background information
- Born: Viktoriya Petrovna Dayneko; May 12, 1987 (age 39); Kirovskiy, Kazakh SSR, Soviet Union
- Genres: Pop; dance
- Occupations: Singer; songwriter; actress
- Years active: 2004–present

Viktoriya Petrovna Dayneko (Russian: Виктория Петровна Дайнеко; born 12 May 1987) is a Russian singer, songwriter, and actress. In 2004, she started her career in Russia after her victory at the Star Factory-5 All-Russian TV show. Dayneko's songs have topped the Russian charts, and the music video of the "Bei Sebia" song has garnered more than 30 million YouTube views. Dayneko has also won Russian music award Golden Gramophone several times. She was declared as a Singer of the Year by Russian Glamour magazine and by Russian Fashion TV. She has appeared on the cover of Russian Playboy magazine three times.

In 2014, she released “V”, an English-language album. In this album she was not only a performer but also a co-writer.

== Early life ==
Dayneko was born in Kirovskiy, Kazakhstan. She spent her childhood in Russia, in the city of Mirny. The girl's parents Peter Dayneko and Evgeniya Dayneko sent their daughter to ballet lessons until the age of 11. During her school years, Dayneko performed at various music venues in the city. She was invited first to the local Reflection pop group and then to a group called Phaeton.

At the age of 17, Dayneko moved to Moscow and enrolled in a university.

== Career ==
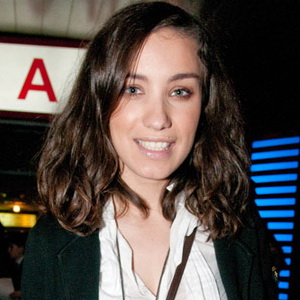
Victoria Dayneko at the presentation of the remake of the horror film "A Nightmare on Elm Street" at the Oktyabr cinema on May 5, 2010.

In 2004, at the age of 17, Dayneko became a participant in the Star Factory-5 popular TV project on Channel One under the direction of singer Alla Pugacheva. Dayneko gained the most votes from the audience and became a project winner. At the Star Factory-5 TV project Victoria performed two solo songs - "Ya Budu Luchshe" (music by O. Voliando, lyrics by K. Arsenyev) and "Leila" (music by I. Matviyenko, lyrics by I. Matviyenko, Y. Buzhilova). The "Snilos Mne" music video clip was filmed (music by A. Marshal, lyrics by K. Kavalerian), singer Alexandr Marshal co-starred in the clip.

At the end of the TV project, Russian composer and producer Igor Matviyenko began working with Dayneko. The singer's debut video for Leila song (music by I. Matvienko, lyrics by Y. Buzhilova) was filmed in 2005 in Thailand. In 2006, Dayneko released a music video for the song "Ya Prosto Srazu Ot Tebya Uydu" (music by I. Matviyenko, lyrics by O. Rovnaya). This song became a Russian hit.

In early 2007, Dayneko recorded a soundtrack for the movie V Ozhidanii Chuda - Film Ne O Lyubvi (music by I. Matviyenko, lyrics by O. Rovnaya). At the same time a video clip for this song was shot.

In fall of 2007 she was a candidate for MTV Russia Music Awards, ceding the nomination to singer MakSim. She also was a Fashion TV award recipient as 2007 Fashion singer. Earlier that year, Dayneko appeared in the Russian Playboy magazine. In the same year she participated in the "Ice Age" project along with Alexei Yagudin with whom she reached the end of the project. Together with Alexei, Victoria recorded the song "Igolka" (music by I. Matviyenko, lyrics by O. Rovnaya) and a video clip.

On March 6, 2008, the debut album "Igolka" was released, which became a first album after three years of work.

In winter of 2008 Dayneko took part in the TV game "Who Wants to Be a Millionaire?" with Alexei Yagudin.

In spring of 2009 she participated in the project of Channel One "Two Stars 2009”, where she took third place along with the actor Alexander Oleshko.

In 2009, Dayneko became a co-host of the Scarlet Sails Festival in St. Petersburg, Russia.

In late 2010, she was a voice of the character Rapunzel in Walt Disney Pictures animated film "Tangled" in Russian.

In 2011, she participated in the “Star Factory. Returning” project where Star Factory graduates of different years competed. Victoria was part of producer Igor Matvienko’s team. As a result of the audience vote, Dayneko won the project.

On May 12, 2014, Dayneko's music single video clip "Bei Sebia" premiered. This clip has garnered more than 30 million YouTube views.

In November 2014 Dayneko was declared Singer of the Year by Russian Glamour Magazine.

On November 14, 2014, her first English-language album, named "V", was released. The album was co-written in London by Dayneko and music producer Pete «Boxsta» Martin.

In May 2015 Dayneko was awarded the title of Distinguished Artist of Karachay-Cherkessia.

In October 2016, an American DreamWorks cartoon "Trolls" was released in Russia. The character Poppy was voiced in Russian by Dayneko.

In April 2018, the first season of director Marius Weisberg's series "Ulyotnyy Ekipazh" was released. Dayneko played Natasha - the main character’s ex-wife.

On June 29, 2018, Dayneko released her second Russian-language album named "Smily", which included songs such as "Taesh" and "Bietsya Serdtze". On February 1, 2019, Dayneko released the album "Magnitnye” (Eng. "Magnetic").

In April and May 2022, Dayneko participated in a series of concerts organized in order to support the 2022 Russian invasion of Ukraine.

Dayneko has a role in Tremendum, a Tony Kaye film still in production.

== Personal life ==
She married DrumCast drummer Dmitry Kleiman in April 2015. Their daughter was born in October 2015. They divorced in fall of 2017.

In April 2025, Victoria Dayneko married Berkeli Öwezow, a geologist of ethnic Turkmen origin, whom she had been dating since 2022. The couple participated together in the adventure reality show Treasures of the Emperor on the TNT channel.
