= Yulia Mikhalchik =

Russian singer-songwriter & composer (born 1985)

Yulia Mikhailchik
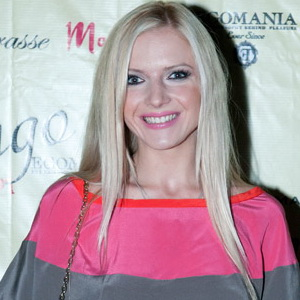
- Mikhalchik in 2010
- Born: Yulia Sergeyevna Mikhalchik; February 2, 1985 (age 41); Slantsy, Leningrad Oblast, RSFSR, USSR
- Occupation: Singer
- Years active: 2003-present

Yulia Sergeyevna Mikhalchik (Russian: Ю́лия Серге́евна Миха́льчик; born February 2, 1985, Slantsy, Leningrad Oblast, RSFSR, USSR) is a Russian pop and folk singer, composer and songwriter.

== Early life ==
Yulia Sergeyevna Mikhalchik was born on February 2, 1985. Her parents noted her musical abilities at a young age and enrolled her a in music school where she studied piano. At the age of 6, she debuted on stage at the music school, performing the song "Kiss-Kiss-Meow." In 1994, she and her mother moved to Saint Petersburg where Mikhalchik gave her first serious performance at the Samanta music festival. Following this, she was accepted into the choir of the Saint Petersburg-based channel 5TV, where she competed in competitions and festivals for a number of years.

Mikhalchik graduated from secondary school in 2002 with a silver medal. She subsequently studied public relations at the Saint Petersburg Humanitarian University of Trade Unions. Later, Mikhalchik graduated from the Russian State University for the Humanities with a degree in PR.

== Career ==
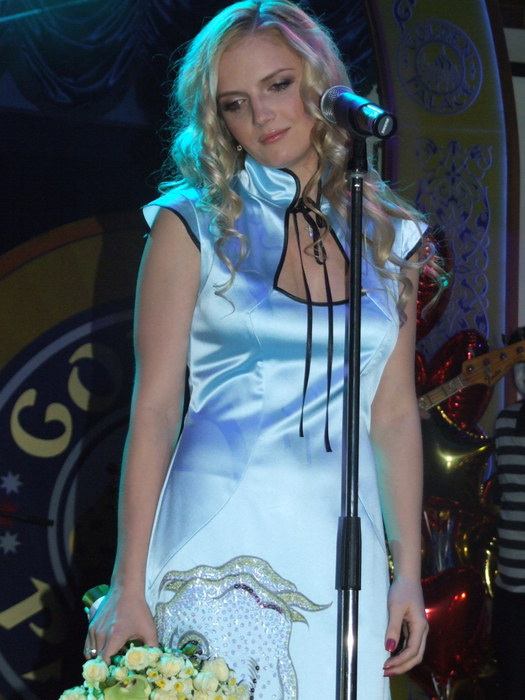
Mikhalchik performing in 2007.

As a child, Mikhalchik participated in various international music competitions, including, in 1999, Clear Voice; in 2000, the competition Amber Star in Jurmala; in 2001, the competition Young Petersburg, the contest Voice of Peace and the St. Petersburg competition Idols of the XXI century (Grand Prix). She was scouted by producer Sergey Kokay in 2002 to become part of the group Korona, with which she performed in night clubs in St. Petersburg.

During the first year of her studies at the university, she presented the programme Youth Channel on TNT. However, she rose to prominence a year later when she applied to the Russian reality music competition Fabrika Zvyozd upon Alexander Shulgin's invitation. Here, she made it to the final sixteen participants. She stayed on the show until the final, where she eventually placed third. As a result of her participation in the television programme, Mikhalchik was forced to drop out of her university degree.

Following Fabrika Zvyozd, Mikhailchik released her first single "So l'dom" in 2004 and her first album Yesli pridyot zima in 2006, which was produced by Viktor Drobysh. That latter year, she received her first and only Golden Gramophone Award for the song "Do svidaniya, Piter". In 2005, she sang two duets with Al Bano in the State Kremlin Palace during his concert show Al Bano and His Ladies.

In 2006, she also participated in the second All-Russian music festival 5 Stars, held in Sochi in September 2006, where she on the Grand Prix. Subsequently, she released her second album Kosy.

In 2008, she participated in the Russian preselection for the Eurovision Song Contest 2008. With her song "Cold Fingers", she finished sixth in the final. In 2009, she starred as Charlotte in the rock opera Perfume, on the play by Patrick Süskind.

During the 2010s, Mikhalchik changed her style from pop-folk to Russian chanson. In 2011, she released a third album, containing old Russian chansons. In 2019, Mikhalchik performed "Snova i snova", an electropop song, during New Wave. In that same year, she took part in the television programme The Fate of a Person on Russia-1, chronicling her life.

== Personal life ==
Mikhalchik was engaged to musician Alexander Shulgin in 2003, but up broke with him a year later. The relationship with Shulgin was controversial in Russia for the 21 year age gap between the two. Next to that, it was controversial because Shulgin was the creative producer of the season of Fabrika Zvyozd in which Mikhalchik took part. Shulgin proposed to Mikhalchik during the final of the show, but the proposal was cut out in later broadcasts of the final.

In 2011, Mikhalchik married a businessman named Vladimir. In 2013, their son was born. In March 2016, the couple divorced.

When Mikhalchik was around 23 years old, she started struggling with anorexia nervosa and was hospitalised for one month in her most critical phase. Next to that, she had problems with depression. In 2018, she starred in an episode of Live healthily on Channel One Russia, in which she told about her experiences with anorexia.

== Awards ==
- 1999 — Winner of the international competition Sonorous voices in the city of Vyborg
- 2000 — Winner of the international competition Amber Star in Jurmala
- 2001 — Winner of the contest Young Petersburg in St. Petersburg
- 2001 — Winner of the Wider Circle international festival in Narva
- 2001 — Grand Prix of competition Idols of the XXI Century in St. Petersburg
- 2003 — Third place in the Channel One Russia on Fabrika Zvyozd
- 2005 — Prize Golden Gramophone for the song Goodbye, Piter
- 2006 — Grand Prix of the festival 5 Star of young artists
- 2012 — Prize Star of Road Radio
