= Stas Piekha =

Russian singer (born 1980)

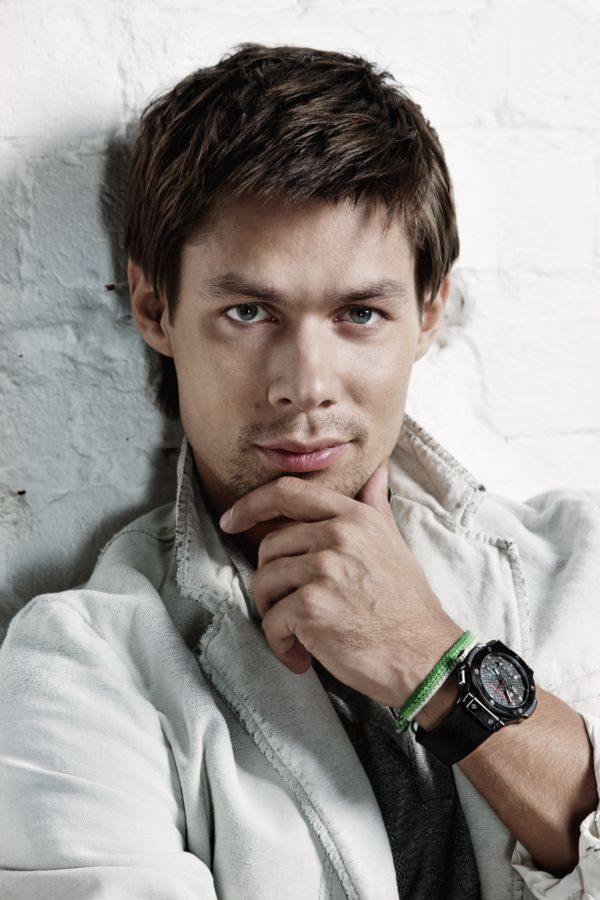
- Stas Piekha

Background information
- Born: Stanislav Pyatrasovich Gerulis; 13 August 1980 (age 46); Leningrad, USSR
- Origin: Saint Petersburg, Russia
- Genres: Pop, traditional pop
- Occupations: Singer, actor
- Website: stas-pjeha.ru

Stanislav Pyatrasovich "Stas" Piekha (Russian: Станислав Пятрасович "Стас" Пьеха), is a Russian popular singer and actor, and the grandson of Edita Piekha.

== Early life ==
Piekha was born on 13 August 1980, the grandson of Edita Piekha and the son of Ilona Bronevitskaya, who were both famous USSR popular singers. His father, Petras Gerulis, was a Lithuanian jazz musician. As a young boy, Piekha spent time on tour with his grandmother while his mother pursued her solo career. At the age of 7, at his grandmother's insistence, his last name was formally changed from Gerulis to Piekha and he was enrolled in the Choir Singing Glinka College in Leningrad to study the piano and choral singing. Subsequently, he was enrolled in the Gnessin conservatory, but he did not complete his degree.

== Career ==
In 2004, Piekha became a contestant on the fourth season of the Russian hit television show Star Factory (Russian: Фабрика звёзд), a singing competition analogous to American Idol. He recorded his first popular hit during the show, a song called "One star" (Russian: Одна звезда). During his audition for the show, Piekha said that his dream duet partner would be the Russian pop star Valeriya. He got his wish during one of the episodes and recorded the duet "You are sad" (Russian: Ты грустишь) together with Valeriya. He also sang "July Morning" in a duet with Ken Hensley. At the conclusion of the season, Piekha became one of the three finalists and won a recording contract which led to the release of his debut album titled "One star", named after his first hit. He followed it up with a sophomore effort in 2008, releasing the album Otherwise (Russian: Иначе).

In May 2011, Piekha took part in the television program Ukraine Voice (similar format to American show The Voice) on the Ukrainian channel "1+1" as one of the four judges. He then took part in the television show Popstar to Operastar, also on "1+1", which was an adaptation of the British format to Ukrainian television.

== Politics ==
On February 6, 2012, he was officially registered as a confidant of the candidate for the President of the Russian Federation, Prime Minister of the Russian Federation Vladimir Putin.

In August 2015, on the recommendation of the Odesa regional administration, Stas Piekha was denied entry to Ukraine. As noted on the official website of the Odesa Regional State Administration, this was done "because of his support for the occupation of Crimea and the frantic pro-Putin propaganda."

In 2018, he was a confidant of the candidate for mayor of Moscow, Sergei Sobyanin.

Piekha supported the 2022 Russian invasion of Ukraine, and the Presidential Administration of Russia put him on the list of singers who were recommended to be invited to state-sponsored events. In January 2023, Ukraine imposed sanctions on Stas for his support of the invasion.

== Discography ==
=== Studio albums ===
- 2005 — One star (Russian: Одна звезда)
- 2008 — Otherwise (Russian: Иначе)

=== Compilations ===
- 2013 — 10

== Filmography ==
=== Documentaries ===
- "My beautiful family" (Russian: Моя прекрасная семья, TV series)
- "Epoch of Piekha" (Russian: Эпоха Пьеха)
- "Unbelievable Stories of Love" (Russian: Невероятные истории любви)
- "My Mother Has Married" (Russian: Моя мама вышла замуж)
- "Show Business. X-Files" (Russian: Секретные материалы шоу-бизнеса)
