= Zara (Russian singer) =

Russian singer (born 1983)

HAR Zara
- Зара
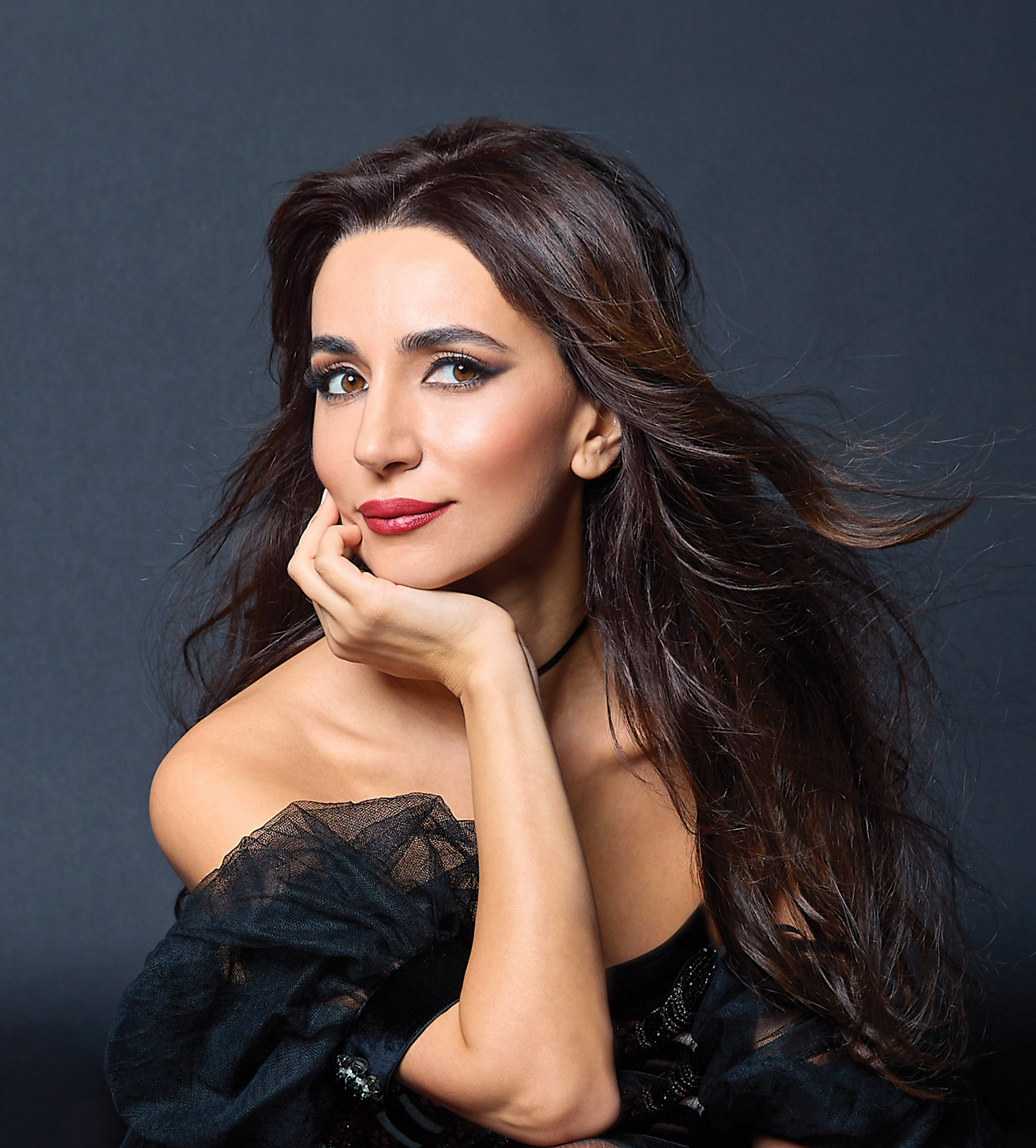
- Zara in 2017
- Born: Zarifa Pashaevna Mgoyan; 26 July 1983 (age 43); Leningrad, Russian SFSR, Soviet Union (present day Russia)
- Education: Russian State Institute of Performing Arts (2004)
- Occupations: Singer; actress; social activist; humanitarian
- Years active: 1996-present
- Children: 2
- Musical career
- Origin: St. Petersburg, Russia
- Genres: Pop; folk music; Russian romance; estrada
- Instruments: Vocals; piano
- Label: United Music Group
- Website: www.zara.ru

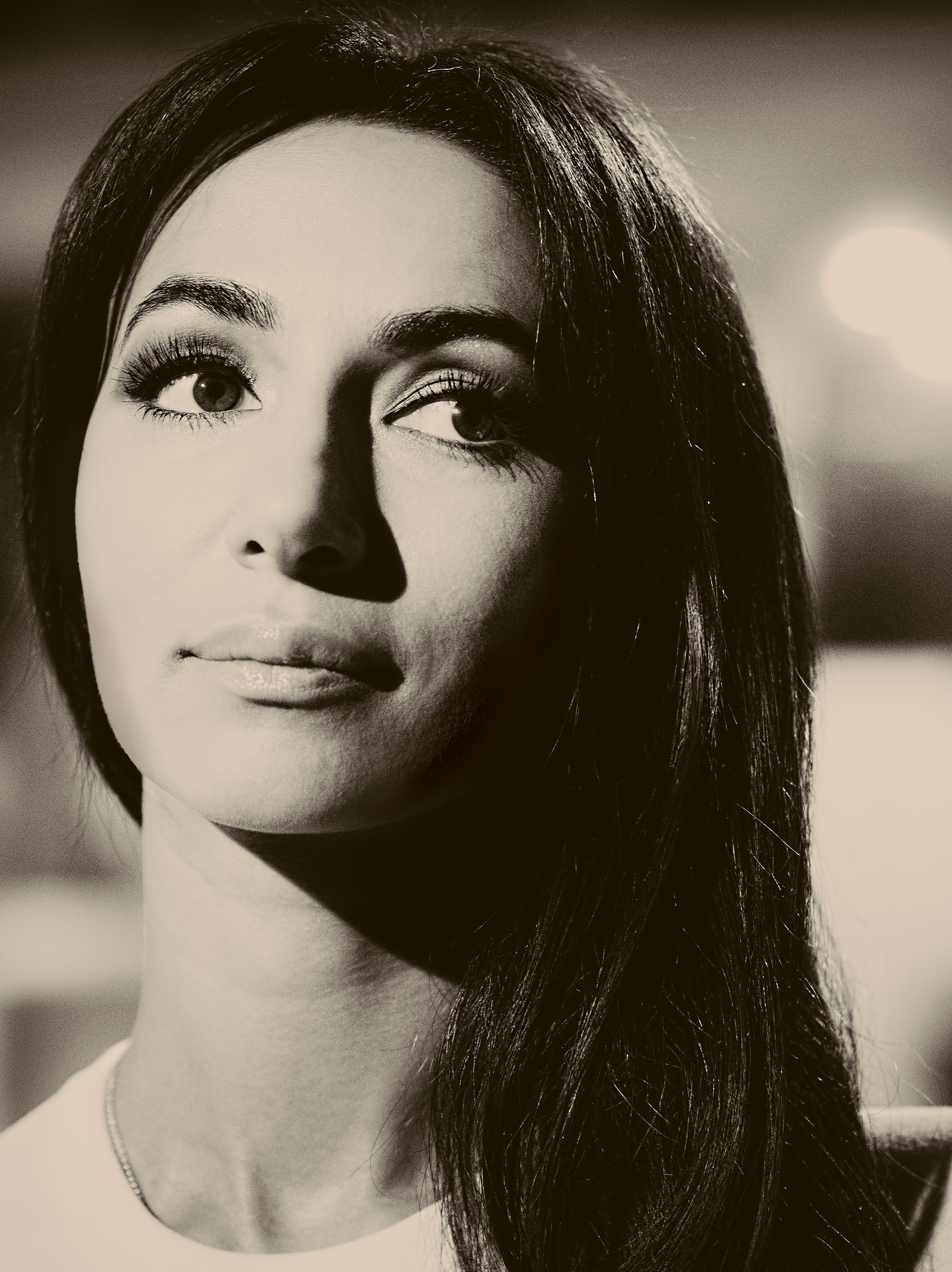
Zara in TV show Morning at Petersburg – Channel 5, 2016

Zarifa Pashaevna Mgoyan (Russian: Зарифа́ Паша́евна Мгоя́н; born 26 July 1983), known as Zara (За́ра), is a Russian pop singer, actress, and social activist of Yezidi-Kurdish ethnicity. She was awarded the title of Merited Artist of the Russian Federation in 2016. She has recorded ten studio albums, and received several Golden Gramophone Award, and diplomas of the Pesnya goda Russian TV festival. As an actress, Zara is known for her roles in the "Streets of Broken Lights" (2001), "Spetsnaz 2" (2004), and "Favorsky" (2005) TV series, and the feature films "Pushkin. The Last Duel" (2006), and "White Sand" (2011).

== Early life and education ==
She was born in Leningrad to a Yezidi-Kurdish family. Her father, Pasha Binbashievich Mgoyan, a Candidate of Sciences in Physics and Mathematics, is employed in the machine building industry, and her mother, Nadi Dzhamаlovna Mgoyan, is a housewife. Her parents were born in Leninakan, Armenia. Zara also has an elder sister Liana and a younger brother Roman.

Zara attended secondary school No. 2 in Otradnoye, Kirovsky District, Leningrad Oblast. In 2000, she graduated from Gymnasium No. 56 in Saint Petersburg with a silver medal. Alongside her secondary school studies, she graduated from a children's music school with honors, specializing in piano.

== Artistic career ==
In 1995, at the age of 12, Zara met musician and composer Oleg Kvasha, and in 1996, they recorded the songs "The Heart of Juliette", "Just Today", "Right Now…" and "Lullaby (Bye-Bye-Bye)", which got rotations on radio stations, and brought the first fame to the singer.

In 1997, at the age of 14, Zara became a finalist of the Morning Star TV contest (Moscow) with "The Heart of Juliette", and won the Grand Prix of the Let the Children Laugh International Festival (Cairo and Port Said, Egypt).

In 1998, she won the Grand Prix of The Hopes of Siberia contest (Omsk), the Birthday open contest for new children's song performers, and The Hit of the Year International TV Contest (both in Saint Petersburg). For two years running, Zara received the First Class Diploma and the Grand Prix at The Hopes of Europe contest (Sochi); in 1999, at the Voices-1999 festival in Sochi she got the "People's Choice Award".

In 2004, she graduated from the Russian State Institute of Performing Arts. During her studies, Zara acted in "The Voices of the Age Gone By", "The Idiot", and "Heavenly Swallows" plays on the stage of the Student Theater on Mokhovaya Street.

In 2006, the singer made it to the final of the Fabrika Zvyozd on Channel One Russia, which was produced by Victor Drobysh, and in 2009 she was a finalist of the Two Stars project, where her duet with the Honored Artist of Russia, actor Dmitry Pevtsov, won second place. In 2010, Zara took part in the Ice and Fire ice show (Channel One Russia) together with the Olympic champion in figure skating Anton Sikharulidze.

In March 2011, she took part in the Star Factory. Return project.

Since early 2015, Zara is a permanent judge on the New Star all-Russian TV song contest which is held on TV channel Zvezda with the support of the Ministry of Defence (Russia).

On 24 November 2016, she held a solo concert at the State Kremlin Palace in Moscow dedicated to the 20th anniversary of her artistic career. She sang: war songs, classical romances, folk songs, international and Russian pop hits. Nikolay Baskov, Stas Mikhailov, Dmitry Pevtsov, Victor Drobysh, and Italian tenor Andrea Bocelli, with whom Zara sang La Grande Storia duet, also took part in the event. The new "Millimeters" album was released for this concert.

On 9 June 2017, Zara and Andrea Bocelli received a special award of MUZ-TV Music Awards – "The best international duet". Very soon the singer invited by Bocelli, performed at his annual concert "Il canto della terra" on the stage of Teatro del Silenzio in Toskana, where she sang "Dle Yaman", and then she took part in Bocelli's Gala concert Celebrity Fight Night in the Roman Colosseum.

At Zara's solo concert in the State Kremlin Palace on 14 October 2017, French singer Mireille Mathieu performed; together they sang a song "Under the Paris sky". For the first time, Zara and Mireille Mathieu sang together at the Spasskaya Tower Military Music Festival and Tattoo in 2016 and 2017. Also, they performed at the Zara's solo concert in the UNESCO headquarters in Paris on 4 December 2017.

== Cultural and social activities ==
Zara takes part annually in the International Festival of Arts Slavianski Bazaar in Vitebsk. In 2014, she received the Union State Award for Artistic Presentation of the Idea of Friendship between the People Of Belarus and Russia.

In late December 2015, the singer visited Latakia with a solo concert at the Khmeimim (air base) to support the Russian troops fighting against ISIL (banned in Russia), and to boost the morale of the Russian Air Force group.

On 28 February 2016, she visited Syria for the second time with another solo concert at the Khmeimim (air base) for the Russian troops.

On 25 March 2016, Zara received a Participant of the Military Operation in Syria medal for support for the operation of the Russian Armed Forces in Syria.

On 5 December 2016, Zara was designated a UNESCO Artist for Peace for her commitment to the values and ideals of the organization, and shaping and strengthening the idea of peace and understanding between people. The designation ceremony took place at the UN Headquarters in Paris.

On 9 September 2017, Zara directed the first International ethnic festival Music of our Hearts in Kolomenskoye.

On 27 December 2017, Zara arrived in Syria for the third time to the Khmeimim (air base), where she performed for Russian officers with the group of artists. At the same time, terrorists launched several rockets aimed to the airbase, but they were shot down by the Russian anti-aircraft warfare.

On 14 January 2018, Zara became a trustee of Vladimir Putin at the 2018 Russian presidential election.

She supported the 2022 Russian invasion of Ukraine, and the Presidential Administration of Russia put her on the list of singers who were recommended to be invited to state-sponsored events.

=== Charity work ===
Zara is a member of the supervisory board of the Step Towards Charity Foundation (Saint Petersburg), which helps people (children and adults) in hardships, as well as children with cancer and cerebral palsy.

Zara also takes part in multiple charity projects by the Answering the Call of the Heart Foundation helping visually impaired children established by pop singer and social activist Diana Gurtskaya. Since 2010, the singer performs at the White Cane Annual Charity Festival aiming to support the rehabilitation of visually impaired young children and adults.

On 22 January 2017, Zara became a special guest at the award ceremony of the X Anniversary We Are Together Festival of Applied Arts presenting the art of children with special needs. The event was held by the Moscow Department of Culture and the Cinematographer Foundation for Social Cultural Initiative Development. The singer opened the grand ceremony with her song "Faith", gave a speech, and also took part in educational workshops.

On 13 April 2017, Zara arranged an exhibition of the Festival laureate works "We are together" at UNESCO headquarters. She is the Ambassador of the football competition among orphans "Future depends on you", she joined the team of federal ambassadors of the 2018 FIFA World Cup.

In October 2020, she spoke at an online session for Eurasian region youth in peace building.

== Personal life ==
In 2004, Zara married Sergei Matvienko, the son of Saint Petersburg Governor Valentina Matvienko and vice president for information technology at Bank Saint Petersburg. At her husband’s insistence, she converted to Orthodox Christianity. The church wedding took place at Kazan Cathedral in Saint Petersburg, and the civil marriage was registered at Wedding Palace No. 1 in Saint Petersburg.

In 2006, Zara divorced her first husband, Sergei Matvienko, allegedly because he wanted her to focus on her family and not her career.

In 2010, she married Sergei Ivanov of Saint Petersburg and converted to Russian Orthodoxy. They had two children, Daniil (born 2010) and Maxim (born 2012). They divorced in 2016.

In March 2018, journalist Anna Mongayt released a report on the relationship between State Duma deputy Leonid Slutsky and Zara. The report noted that, thanks to Slutsky, Zara made a notable political career and, in 2016, received the honorary title Honored Artist of the Russian Federation.

== Discography ==
Russian name	Translation	Year
Сердце Джульетты	The Heart Of Juliet	1999
Зара	Zara	2000
Там, где течёт река	Where the river runs	2002
Zara	Zara	2003
Не оставляй меня одну	Don't leave me alone	2004
Я не та	I'm not the one	2007
Для неё	For her	2009
В тёмных глазах твоих	In the dark eyes of yours	2013
#Миллиметры	#Millimeters	2016
Klama Dilê Min	Voice of my heart	2023

== Video clips ==
Russian name	Translation	Year
Где течёт река	Where the river runs	2002
Замела зима	Snowy winter	2007
Небом на двоих	Sky for two	2007
Для неё	For her	2009
Недолюбила	Not in love anymore	2009
Ничья	Nobody's	2010
Амели	Amelie	2011
Любовь на бис	Love encore (duet with Alexander Rosenbaum)	2011
Спящая красавица	Sleeping beauty (duet with Stas Mikhailov)	2013
Счастье над Землёй	Happiness above the Ground	2014
Этот год любви	This year of love	2015
Ленинград	Leningrad	2016
#Миллиметры	#Millimeters	2017
Мир вашему дому	Peace to your Home	2017
Я лечу	I'm fly	2018

Dayê (Mother) 2019

Welatê Min, featuring Sivan Perwer (My Country) 2021

== Awards ==
=== Orders, decorations, and medals of Russia ===
- 2016 – honorary title of the Merited Artist of the Russian Federation for a large contribution to the development of the Russian culture and arts, and many years of productive work.

=== Ministerial awards of the Russian Federation ===
- 2009 – the Arts Award of the Federal Security Service in the Musical Art category (Third Prize) — for performance of the song "It's Only a War".
- 2009 – medal For Faith and Goodness of Kemerovo Oblast of the Russian Federation — for active charitable and social activities in Kemerovo Oblast.
- 2011 — 65 Years of the Legal Service of the MIA of Russia medal.
- 2015 – honorary title of the Honored Artist of the Karachay-Cherkessia — for many years of artistic work and cultural merit.
- 2017 – the Medal for a huge contribution into the cooperation of the Russian Federation and the United Nations in questions of education, science and culture (UNESCO).

=== Awards and emblems of the Ministry of Defence of the Russian Federation ===
- 2016 – medal of a Participant of the Military Operation in Syria of the Ministry of Defence (Russia) (Order of the Minister of Defense of the Russian Federation S.K. Shoigu No. 69 of 8 February 2016) — for support for the military operation of the Russian Armed Forces in Syria.

=== Public prizes and awards of the Russian Federation ===
- 2002 – The National Music Award "The Golden Gramophone" for the song "Color of the Night";
- 2005 – The National Music Award "The Golden Gramophone" for the song "Blizzard";
- 2007 – The National Music Award "The Golden Gramophone" for the song "Love-beauty";
- 2009 – The Award of the Federal Safety Service in nomination "Musical Art" for singing a song "It is just a war...";
- 2009 – The national Music Award "The Golden Gramophone" for the song "For Her";
- 2010 – The National Music Award "The Golden Gramophone" for the song "Not in love anymore" (Nedolubila);
- 2011 – The National Music Award "The Golden Gramophone" for the song "Love for One More Time!" (Lubov na bis!) featuring Alexander Rosenbaum;
- 2013 – The National Music Award "The Song of the Year" for the song "Sleeping Beauty" featuring Stas Mikhaylov;
- 2014 – The National Music Award "The Song of the Year" for the song "Happiness Above the Ground";
- 2014 – The Award of the Union State;
- 2015 – The National Music Award "The Song of the Year" for the song "This Year of Love";
- 2016 – The National Music Award "The Golden Gramophone" for the song "Leningrad";
- 2016 – The National Music Award "Song of the Year" for the song "Leningrad";
- 2017 — RU.TV Music Award in nomination "Best Video Shot Abroad";
- 2017 — MUZ-TV Music Award in nomination "Best International Duet";
- 2017 – Real MusicBox Award in nomination "Charity";
- 2017 – The National Music Award "The Golden Gramophone" for the song "Millimeters";
- 2017 – The National Music Award "The Song of the Year" for the song "Peace to Your Home".

=== International public titles, awards, and prizes ===
- 2014 – winner of the Union State Literature and Arts Award for Artistic Presentation of the Idea of Friendship between the People of Belarus and Russia.
- 2016 – designation of a UNESCO Artist for Peace — for commitment to the values and ideals of the organization, and shaping and strengthening the idea of peace and understanding between people.
