= Sogdiana (singer) =

Uzbek singer and actress (born 1984)

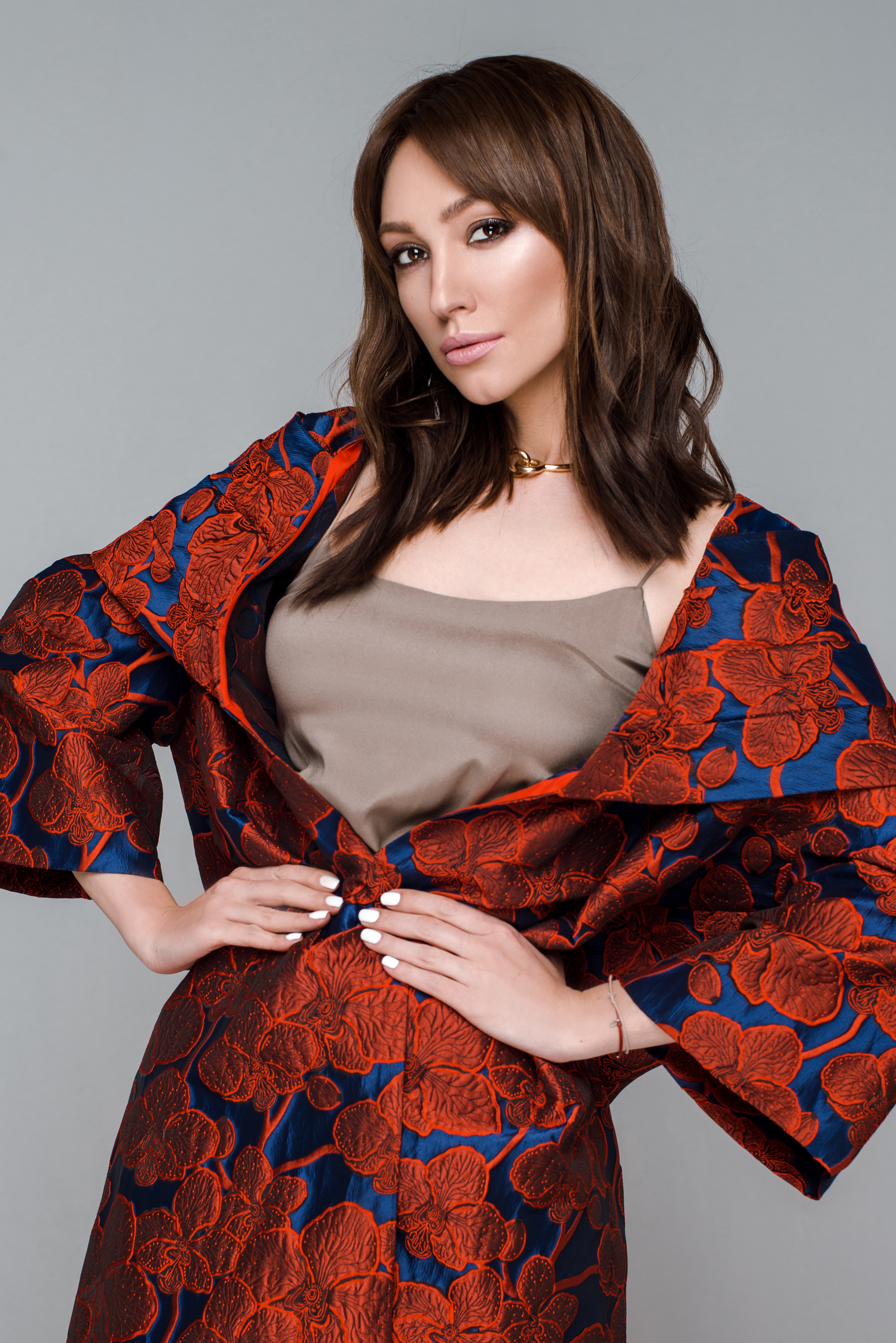

Background information
- Born: Oksana Vladmirovna Nechitaylo; February 17, 1984 (age 42); Tashkent, Uzbek SSR, USSR
- Genres: Folk, Pop, Traditional, pop-folk
- Occupations: Singer, Actress
- Years active: 2000–present
- Website: www.sogdianamusic.ru/

Sogdiana (Russian: Согдиана), also known as Sogdiana Fedorinskaya (Russian: Согдиана Федоринская), born Oksana Vladimirovna Nechitaylo (Russian: Оксана Владимировна Нечитайло), is an Uzbek-Russian singer and actress. She was born on February 17, 1984, in Tashkent. She is of Ukrainian descent.

She sings in Russian, Ukrainian, Uzbek, Tajik, French, Chechen and English.

Sogdiana has written some of her own songs. Her stage name refers to the ancient Eastern Iranian kingdom and province of Sogdia, which was located partly within modern-day Uzbekistan. She has cited Sofia Rotaru, Queen, Lara Fabian, Mariah Carey, Ofra Haza, and Whitney Houston as her musical influences.

== Career ==
In 2005, Sogdiana participated in the International Musical Festival of Pop Discovery, held in Varna, Bulgaria. Following this, she was invited to the Canzoni dal Mondo international competition. Her song "Yurak Mahzun" received an award for "Best Arrangement," and she was nominated for "Best Singer." That same year, she released her second solo album, Mening Shahzodam (My Prince), in Tashkent, Uzbekistan.

In 2006, she appeared in the film Hodzha Nasreddin – Game Begins in the role of Jasmin. Her song "Heart-Magnet" was released to radio and played on 129 stations. By the end of June 2006, she began touring with "Factory of Stars-6" across Russia and the CIS countries.

Later in 2006, she starred in the biographical film Sogdiana, directed by Yakubov. The singer co-wrote the film's soundtracks, "Orzularim" (My Dreams) and "Meni Esla" (Remember Me), with Ravil Gimazutdinov. Russian versions of these songs were also released as "Catch Up with the Wind" and "It's Not a Dream." On August 30, 2006, Philipp Kirkorov praised her performance of "Heart-Magnet," calling her a talented actress. The film Sogdiana was released in Tashkent on November 15.

On November 25, 2006, she attended the Golden Gramophone Awards ceremony in the Kremlin. Her song "Heart-Magnet" had spent 20 weeks on the charts, earning her a Golden Gramophone award. In December, she performed at the "New Songs About the Main Thing" festival. She also held three solo concerts at the Palace of Friendship of People in Tashkent, performing songs in Russian, Uzbek, and French. She was nominated for "Best Singer of the Year" at the MTVA Awards in Uzbekistan that same month. Although nominated for a "Sound Track" award in early 2007, the award went to the singer Valeriya.

In March 2007, Sogdiana received the Pilar Award. Around this time, she ended her contract with manager Victor Drobysh by mutual agreement and began managing her own career. In April, she released the song "Blue Sky" and its music video. During this period, she married an Indian businessman in a ceremony in Malaysia.

Throughout late 2007, she performed on "Factory of Stars-7," singing duets with Natalia Tumshevits and Tatyana Bogachyova. Her song "Blue Sky" charted for 20 weeks, earning her a second Golden Gramophone award in December. She also performed at the year-end festival "New and Old Songs About the Main Thing."

In February 2008, Sogdiana co-hosted a radio program with Alla Dovlatova. On February 14, she released the album Heart-Magnet, which included 11 songs and 3 remixes. In March 2008, she performed at a concert in Red Square during the Russian Presidential Elections. Her song "Catch Up with the Wind" remained on the charts for 14 weeks.

In 2009, she recorded the songs "Sinee Nebo," "Vspominaj Menja," and "Na Vostok Ot Jedema." She wrote the lyrics for the latter two songs. She also released a music video for "S Toboi Ili Bez Tebja." In the summer of 2009, she married hockey coach Bashir Kushtov.

Throughout her career, she has performed covers of various songs, including a Russian version of Lara Fabian's "To Love Again," an Uzbek version of "Show Me" by Ofra Haza, and "De L'abime Au Rivage" by Emma Shapplin.

== Personal life ==
Sogdiana has been married three times and has three sons.

== Filmography ==
=== Actress ===
Film
Year	Film	Translation	Role	Notes
2006	Hodzha Nasreddin – game begins	Xo'ja Nasriddin: O'yin boshlandi	Jasmin	Leading role
2006	Sogdiana	Sug'diyona	Sogdiana	Leading role
2006	A New Year's Beauty	Yangi yil parisi	Setora	Supporting role

== Discography ==
- Mening ko'ngilim (2001)
- Mening Shahzodam (2005)
- Sen kelma (2006)
- Serdce-Magnit ("Magnetic Heart", Russian: "Сердце-Магнит") (2008)
- Edema ("Eden", Russian: Эдем) (2011)

== Music Videos ==
- 2004 — Ovora Bo'lma
- 2004 — Netay
- 2004 — Mening Shahzodam
- 2005 — Sen Kelma
- 2005 — Yurak Mahzun
- 2005 — Serdce-Magnit ("Magnetic Heart", Russian: "Сердце-Магнит")
- 2006 — Orzularim
- 2006 — Meni Esla
- 2007 — Sinee Nebo ("Blue Sky", Russian: "Синее Небо")
- 2008 — Razletelis' Oblaka ("Scattered Clouds", Russian: "Разлетелись Облака")
- 2009 — Vspominay Menya ("Remember Me", Russian: "Вспоминай меня")
- 2009 — Na Vostok Ot Edema ("East of Eden", Russian: "На Восток от Эдема")
- 2010 — S Toboy Ili Bez Tebya ("With Or Without You", Russian: "С тобой или без тебя")
- 2014 — Molniya ("Lightning", Russian: "Молния")
