= Igor Matvienko =

Russian composer

- Игорь Матвиенко
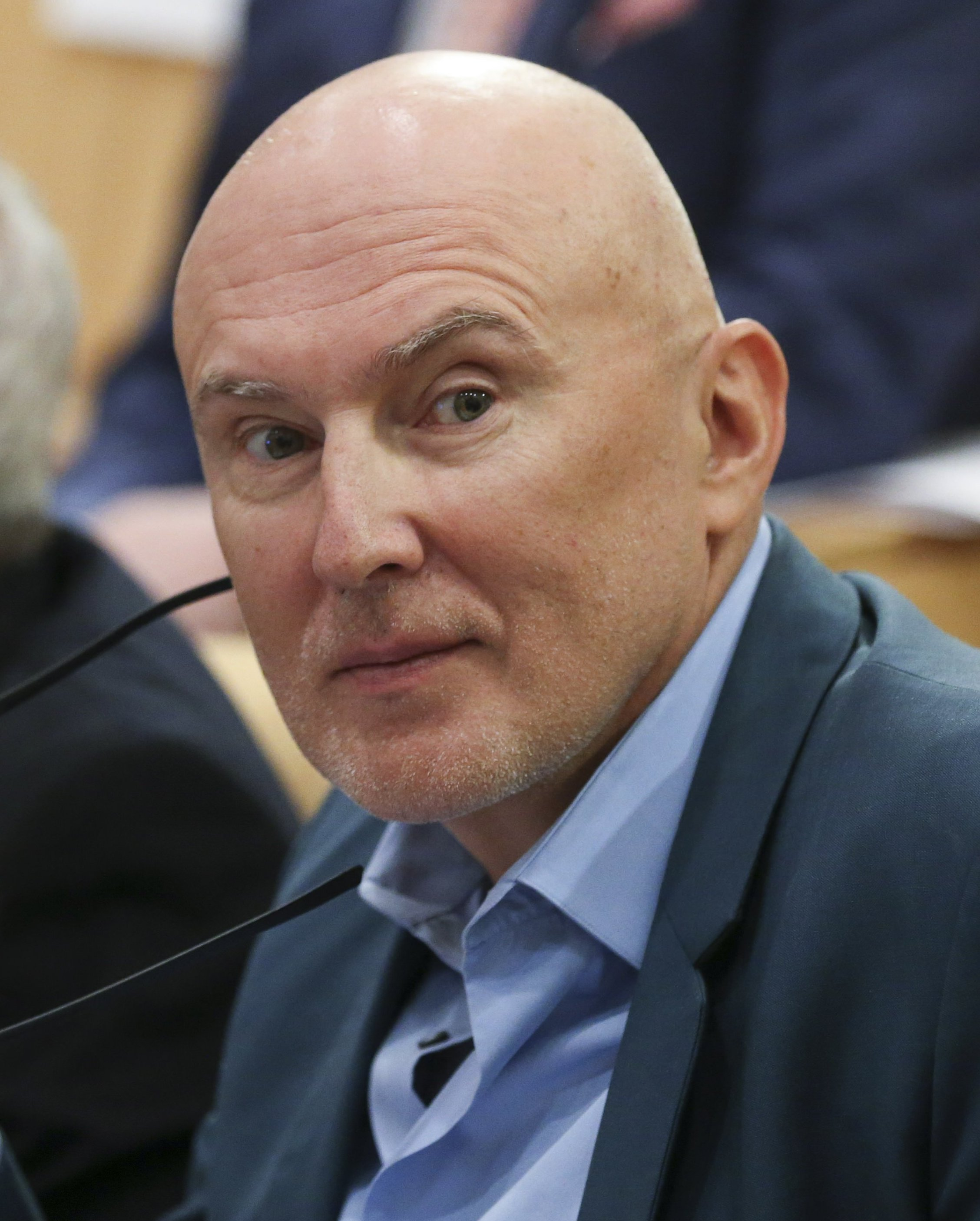
- Matvienko in 2019
- Born: Igor Igorevich Matvienko; 6 February 1960 (age 66); Moscow, Soviet Union
- Occupations: Music producer, composer, songwriter

Igor Igorevich Matvienko (Russian: Игорь Игоревич Матвиенко; born February 6, 1960) is a Soviet and Russian producer, composer and founder of the bands Lyube, Ivanushki International, Korni, Fabrika, and KuBa.

== Compositions ==
Igor Matvienko wrote many songs in collaboration with Alexander Shaganov. In 2016, the anthem of the Russian Ground Forces (“Forward, infantry!") was written by Matvienko. A number of songs were written in collaboration with the poet Mikhail Andreev.

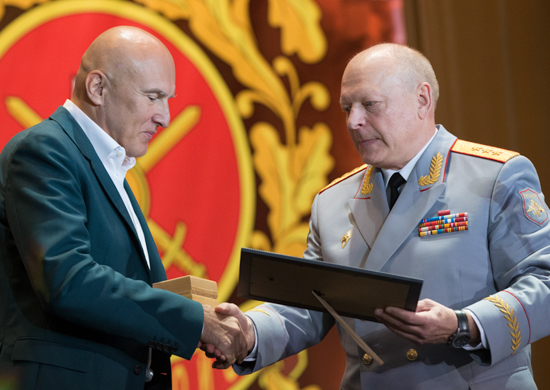
Matvienko with the Commander-in-Chief of the Ground Forces Oleg Salyukov during the presentation of the anthem of the Russian Ground Forces on 1 October 2016
