= Odin v odin! season 1 =

Odin v odin!
- Season 1
- No. of episodes: 12

Release
- Original network: Channel One Russia
- Original release: March 3 – June 2, 2013

Season chronology
- Next → 2

Season one of Odin v odin! premiered on March 3, 2013.

== Celebrities ==
Celebrity	Occupation	Result
Evgeny Kungurov	Opera singer	10th place
Alexey Kortnev	Singer	9th place
Sati Kazanova	Singer	8th place
Sergey Penkin	Singer	7th place
Eva Polna	Singer	6th place
Anastasia Stotskaya	Singer	5th place
Anita Tsoy	Singer	4th place
Timur Rodriguez	Comedian and singer	Third place
Yulia Savicheva	Singer	Runner up
Alexey Chumakov	Singer	Winner

== Imitations chart ==
Highest scoring performance
Lowest scoring performance
Qualified for the final
Didn't qualify for the final

The following chart contains the names of the iconic singers that the celebrities imitated every week.

Celebrity	Week 1	Week 2	Week 3	Week 4	Week 5	Week 6	Week 7	Week 8	Week 9	Week 10	Week 11	Points	Week 12 – Final	Place
Alexey Chumakov	Ilya Lagutenko	Alexander Serov	Lyubov Uspenskaya	Stevie Wonder	Boris Moiseev	Justin Timberlake	Montserrat Caballe	Valery Leontiev	Leonid Utyosov	Avraam Russo	Sting	500	Philipp Kirkorov	1st
Yulia Savicheva	Whitney Houston	Kylie Minogue	Nadezhda Kadysheva	Stas Mikhaylov	Zhanna Aguzarova	Celine Dion	Alla Pugacheva	Freddie Mercury	Masha Rasputina	Glukoza	Zemfira	414	Lyudmila Gurchenko	2nd
Timur Rodriguez	Michael Jackson	Mick Jagger	Leonid Agutin	Lyudmila Gurchenko	James Brown	Sergey Penkin	Sergey Mazayev	Nyusha	Adriano Celentano	Jay Kay	Ray Charles	454	Eros Ramazzotti & Cher	3rd
Anita Tsoy	Tina Turner	Timati	Beyonce	Lyubov Kazarnovskaya	Lady Gaga	Edith Piaf	Alla Pugacheva	Diana Ross	Viktor Tsoi	Shakira	Tamara Gverdtsiteli	393	Georg Ots	4th
Anastasia Stotskaya	Lolita	Lyudmila Zykina	Liza Minnelli	Britney Spears	Philipp Kirkorov	Valeriya	Pink	Larisa Dolina	Yolka	Svyatoslav Vakarchuk	Anna German	347	Alla Pugacheva	5th
Eva Polna	Edita Piekha	Madonna	Valery Meladze	Marlene Dietrich	Elena Vaenga	Diana Arbenina	Bogdan Titomir	Cesária Évora	Irina Allegrova	Mikhail Shufutinsky	Jennifer Lopez	298	Mayte Mateos	6th
Sergey Penkin	Grigory Leps	Vladimir Presnyakov	Louis Armstrong	Lev Leshchenko	Demis Roussos	Klavdiya Shulzhenko	Nikolay Baskov	Alexander Gradsky	Elvis Presley	Elton John	Anne Veski	292	Thomas Anders	7th
Sati Kazanova	Marilyn Monroe	Anzhelika Varum	Nani Bregvadze	Rihanna	Laima Vaikule	Dima Bilan	Barbra Streisand	Kristina Orbakaite	Sofia Rotaru	Valentina Tolkunova	PSY	273	María Mendiola	8th
Alexey Kortnev	Iosif Kobzon	Ella Fitzgerald	Boris Grebenshchikov	Igor Nikolaev	Seal	Garik Sukachov	George Michael	Yuri Antonov	Lidia Ruslanova	Andrey Mironov	Sergey Shnurov	257	Dieter Bohlen	9th
Evgeny Kungurov	Dmitry Hvorostovsky	Eduard Khil	Alexander Buinov	Sergey Zhukov	Nadezhda Babkina	Muslim Magomaev	Alexander Rosenbaum	Frank Sinatra	Seryoga	Feodor Chaliapin	Joe Dassin	226	Andrea Bocelli	10th

== Episodes ==
=== Week 1 (March 3) ===
№	Celebrity	Image	Song	Lyudmila Artemieva	Efim Shifrin	Lyubov Kazarnovskaya	Gennady Khazanov	5 points	Total
1	Sergey Penkin	Grigory Leps	Рюмка водки на столе	8	9	4	5		26
2	Timur Rodriguez	Michael Jackson	Dangerous / Thriller / Billie Jean / You are not Alone	7	10	10	6		33
3	Alexey Chumakov	Ilya Lagutenko	Невеста	10	12	12	12	Polna	51
4	Anita Tsoy	Tina Turner	Simply the Best	12	8	8	7	Kazanova	40
5	Eugeny Kungurov	Dmitri Hvorostovsky	Одинокая гармонь	4	4	7	9		24
6	Sati Kazanova	Marilyn Monroe	I Wanna Be Loved by You	5	5	6	8		24
7	Anastasia Stotskaya	Lolita	Пошлю его на...	3	3	5	3	Tsoy, Kungurov	24
8	Eva Polna	Edyta Piecha	Наш сосед	2	2	2	2	Savicheva, Kortnev, Chumakov, Rodriguez, Penkin	33
9	Yulia Savicheva	Whitney Houston	I Will Always Love You	9	6	9	10	Stotskaya	39
10	Alexey Kortnev	Iosif Kobzon	Я люблю тебя, жизнь	6	7	3	4		20

=== Week 2 (March 10) ===
№	Celebrity	Image	Song	Lyudmila Artemieva	Aleksandr Revva	Lyubov Kazarnovskaya	Gennady Khazanov	5 points	Total
1	Eugeny Kungurov	Eduard Khil	Trollolo	6	5	5	5		21
2	Eva Polna	Madonna	Frozen	2	3	2	2	Savicheva	15
3	Alexey Kortnev	Ella Fitzgerald	Summertime	9	8	6	6	Rodriguez	34
4	Sergey Penkin	Vladimir Presnyakov Jr.	Замок из дождя	3	2	2	3	Kortnev, Chumakov	20
5	Sati Kazanova	Anzhelika Varum	Зимняя вишня	4	7	4	7	Tsoy	27
6	Yulia Savicheva	Kylie Minogue	Can't Get You Out of My Head	7	4	8	8	Polna	32
7	Timur Rodriguez	Mick Jagger	(I Can't Get No) Satisfaction	10	9	10	10	Kungurov	44
8	Anastasia Stotskaya	Lyudmila Zykina	Течёт река Волга	5	10	7	4	Penkin	31
9	Anita Tsoy	Timati	В клубе	8	6	9	9		32
10	Alexey Chumakov	Aleksander Serov	Я люблю тебя до слёз	12	12	12	12	Stotskaya, Kazanova	58

Also in the beginning performed hors concours Aleksand Oleshko and Nonna Grishayeva as Leonid Utyosov and Lyubov Orlova (potpourri of song from Jolly Fellows movie)

=== Week 3 (March 17) ===
№	Celebrity	Image	Song	Lyudmila Artemieva	Aleksandr Revva	Lyubov Kazarnovskaya	Gennady Khazanov	5 points	Total
1	Alexey Kortnev	Boris Grebenshchikov	Город золото	3	3	4	3		13
2	Yulia Savicheva	Nadezhda Kadysheva	Колдунья	4	6	5	5		20
3	Anita Tsoy	Beyoncé	Single Ladies (Put a Ring on It)	10	8	8	9		35
4	Alexey Chumakov	Lyubov Uspenskaya	К единственному, нежному...	12	10	12	12	Polna	51
5	Sati Kazanova	Nani Bregvadze	Снегопад	6	5	6	7		24
6	Eugeny Kungurov	Alexander Buinov	Мои финансы	2	2	2	2	Kortnev, Tsoy	18
7	Anastasia Stotskaya	Liza Minnelli	Mein Herr/Maybe This Time	5	4	3	4	Rodriguez, Savicheva, Kungurov	31
8	Eva Polna	Valery Meladze	Вопреки	9	12	10	6	Kazanova, Chumakov, Penkin, Stotskaya	57
9	Timur Rodriguez	Leonid Agutin	Пароход	8	7	7	8		30
10	Sergey Penkin	Louis Armstrong	What a Wonderful World	7	9	9	10		35

=== Week 4 (March 24) ===
Guest: Sergey Zhukov (Ruki Vverh!)

№	Celebrity	Image	Song	Lyudmila Artemieva	Aleksandr Revva	Lyubov Kazarnovskaya	Gennady Khazanov	5 points	Total
1	Eugeny Kungurov	Sergey Zhukov	Крошка моя	3	3	3	4		13
2	Sergey Penkin	Lev Leshchenko	Прощай	5	4	5	5	Tsoy, Savicheva	29
3	Sati Kazanova	Rihanna	Don't Stop the Music	7	6	6	6		25
4	Eva Polna	Marlene Dietrich	Lili Marleen	4	5	4	3	Kortnev	21
5	Alexey Kortnev	Igor Nikolayev	Пять причин	2	2	2	2	Rodriguez, Penkin	18
6	Anastasia Stotskaya	Britney Spears	Toxic	8	8	7	7	Kazanova	35
7	Timur Rodriguez	Lyudmila Gurchenko	Хочешь?	12	10	9	10	Polna, Chumakov, Stotskaya, Kungurov	61
8	Alexey Chumakov	Stevie Wonder	I Just Called to Say I Love You	9	9	12	9		39
9	Anita Tsoy	Lyubov Kazarnovskaya	Habanera	6	7	10	8		31
10	Yulia Savicheva	Stas Mikhaylov	Всё для тебя	10	12	8	12		42

=== Week 5 (March 31) ===
№	Celebrity	Image	Song	Lyudmila Artemieva	Aleksandr Revva	Lyubov Kazarnovskaya	Leonid Yarmolnik	5 points	Total
1	Sati Kazanova	Laima Vaikule	Я вышла на Пиккадилли	8	4	4	9	Stotskaya	30
2	Timur Rodriguez	James Brown	I Got You (I Feel Good)	10	10	10	10	Polna	45
3	Sergey Penkin	Demis Roussos	From Souvenirs to Souvenirs	3	3	3	3	Chumakov, Tsoy	22
4	Eugeny Kungurov	Nadezhda Babkina	Казачка Надя	2	2	2	2	Kortnev, Penkin	18
5	Yulia Savicheva	Zhanna Aguzarova	Старый отель	12	7	9	4	Rodriguez	37
6	Alexey Korntev	Seal	Crazy	5	5	5	7	Kazanova	27
7	Alexey Chumakov	Boris Moiseev	Звёздочка	9	12	12	12		45
8	Anita Tsoy	Lady Gaga	Bad Romance	7	6	7	6		26
9	Eva Polna	Elena Vaenga	Курю	4	8	6	5	Savicheva	28
10	Anastasia Stotskaya	Philipp Kirkorov	Diva/Снег/Единственная моя	6	9	8	8	Kungurov	36

=== Week 6 (April 7) ===
Guests: Diana Arbenina (Nochniye Snaiperi), Dima Bilan

№	Celebrity	Image	Song	Lyudmila Artemieva	Aleksandr Revva	Larisa Dolina	Valdis Pelšs	5 points	Total
1	Eva Polna	Diana Arbenina	Катастрофически	4	4	5	5	Tsoy	23
2	Anita Tsoy	Édith Piaf	Non, je ne regrette rien	7	8	8	7	Polna	35
3	Anastasia Stotskaya	Valeriya	Часики	3	3	2	3	Kortnev, Kungurov, Chumakov	26
4	Eugeny Kungurov	Muslim Magomayev	Мелодия	9	9	3	6		27
5	Alexey Chumakov	Justin Timberlake	My Love	8	7	12	8		35
6	Sergey Penkin	Klavdiya Shulzhenko	Руки	2	2	4	2	Rodriguez, Savicheva, Kazanova, Stotskaya	30
7	Alexey Kortnev	Garik Sukachov	Моя бабушка курит трубку	12	12	9	12		45
8	Timur Rodriguez	Sergey Penkin	Feelings	10	10	10	10		40
9	Yulia Savicheva	Celine Dion	My Heart Will Go On	6	5	6	9	Penkin	31
10	Sati Kazanova	Dima Bilan	Я просто люблю тебя	5	6	7	4		22

Also in the beginning performed hors concours Larisa Dolina as Cher with Strong Enough.

=== Week 7 (April 14) ===
Guests: Sergey Mazayev (Moralny codex), Bogdan Titomir

№	Celebrity	Image	Song	Lyubov Kazarnovskaya	Aleksandr Revva	Lyudmila Artemieva	Gennady Khazanov	5 points	Total
1	Sergey Penkin	Nikolay Baskov	Натуральный блондин	9	6	6	4		25
2	Anita Tsoy	P!nk	Funhouse	8	8	9	6		31
3	Timur Rodriguez	Sergey Mazayev	Первый снег/До свидания, мама	6	7	8	7	Savicheva	33
4	Alexey Kortnev	George Michael	Freedom	4	4	3	5		16
5	Anita Tsoy	Alla Pugacheva	Браво/Старинные часы	7	9	7	9	Rodriguez, Chumakov, Kazanova	47
6	Eva Polna	Bogdan Titomir	Делай как я	5	5	5	8		23
7	Eugeny Kungurov	Alexander Rosenbaum	Вальс-бостон	2	2	2	2		8
8	Sati Kazanova	Barbra Streisand	Woman in Love	3	3	4	3		13
9	Alexey Chumakov	Montserrat Caballé	Hijo de la Luna	12	12	12	10		46
10	Yulia Savicheva	Alla Pugacheva	Монолог (Реквием)	10	10	10	12	Kortnev, Polna, Stotskaya, Kungurov, Penkin, Tsoy	72

=== Week 8 (April 21) ===
Guests: Yuri Antonov, Nyusha

№	Celebrity	Image	Song	Lyudmila Artemieva	Aleksandr Revva	Lyubov Kazarnovskaya	Gennady Khazanov	5 points	Total
1	Anita Tsoy	Diana Ross	I Will Survive	6	7	9	6		28
2	Sergey Penkin	Alexander Gradsky	Как молоды мы были	4	4	4	4	Savicheva	21
3	Alexey Kortnev	Yuri Antonov	Не забывай	3	2	3	3		11
4	Eugeny Kungurov	Frank Sinatra	New York, New York	2	3	2	2		9
5	Anasatsia Stotskaya	Larisa Dolina	Погода в доме	10	6	6	7	Kungurov, Kortnev	39
6	Timur Rodriguez	Nyusha	Выше	7	12	10	10	Kazanova, Tsoy	49
7	Eva Polna	Cesária Évora	Bésame Mucho	9	10	8	8	Chumakov, Stoskaya	45
8	Alexey Chumakov	Valery Leontiev	Казанова/Зелёный свет	8	8	12	12		40
9	Sati Kazanova	Kristina Orbakaitė	Перелётная птица	5	5	5	5		20
10	Yulia Savicheva	Freddie Mercury	The Show Must Go On	12	9	7	9	Rodriguez, Polna, Penkin	52

=== Week 9 (April 28) ===
Guest: Ani Lorak (performed hous concours as Adele with Rolling in the Deep).

№	Celebrity	Image	Song	Lyudmila Artemieva	Aleksandr Revva	Lyubov Kazarnovskaya	Gennady Khazanov	5 points	Total
1	Eva Polna	Irina Allegrova	Императрица	3	3	2	4	Savicheva	17
2	Eugeny Kungurov	Seryoga	Чёрный бумер	6	5	6	5	Penkin, Rodriguez, Stotskaya	37
3	Sergey Penkin	Elvis Presley	Can't Help Falling in Love	4	4	3	3		14
4	Yulia Savicheva	Masha Rasputina	Играй, музыкант	7	7	9	9		32
5	Anita Tsoy	Viktor Tsoi	Мы ждём перемен	10	12	10	10	Chumakov	47
6	Alexey Chumakov	Leonid Utyosov	У Чёрного моря	12	9	12	12	Tsoy	50
7	Sati Kazanova	Sofia Rotaru	Я назову планету именем твоим	5	10	5	7	Polna	32
8	Alexey Kortnev	Lidia Ruslanova	Валенки	2	2	4	2		10
9	Timur Rodriguez	Adriano Celentano	Susanna/Confessa	9	6	7	6	Kungurov, Kazanova, Kortnev	43
10	Anastasia Stotskaya	Elka	На большом воздушном шаре	8	8	8	8		32

=== Week 10 (May 12) ===
№	Celebrity	Image	Song	Lyudmila Artemieva	Aleksandr Revva	Lyubov Kazarnovskaya	Gennady Khazanov	5 points	Total
1	Yulia Savicheva	Glukoza	Невеста	4	4	4	4		16
2	Alexey Kortnev	Andrei Mironov	Жизнь моя — кинематограф/Остров невезения	9	10	8	5	Penkin, Chumakov, Stotskaya	47
3	Timur Rodriguez	Jay Kay	Cosmic Girl/Little L/Canned Heat	5	6	7	8	Polna	31
4	Eugeny Kungurov	Feodor Chaliapin	Эй, ухнем	3	2	2	2	Kazanova	14
5	Eva Polna	Mikhail Shufutinsky	Соседка (Ночной гость)	2	3	3	3	Savicheva, Tsoy	21
6	Alexey Chumakov	Avraam Russo	Далеко-далёко	10	9	10	10		39
7	Sergey Penkin	Elton John	Sorry Seems to Be the Hardest Word	12	12	12	12		48
8	Sati Kazanova	Valentina Tolkunova	Кабы не было зимы	6	8	5	6		25
9	Anastasia Stotskaya	Svyatoslav Vakarchuk	Без бою	8	5	6	7	Kungurov, Kortnev	36
10	Anita Tsoy	Shakira	Objection (Tango)	7	7	9	9	Rodriguez	37

=== Week 11 (May 19)—Semi-Final ===
№	Celebrity	Image	Song	Lyudmila Artemieva	Aleksandr Revva	Lyubov Kazarnovskaya	Gennady Khazanov	5 points	Total
1	Eva Polna	Jennifer Lopez	Let's Get Loud	3	3	3	6		15
2	Sergey Penkin	Anne Veski	Крутой поворот	4	6	4	3	Savicheva	22
3	Eugeny Kungurov	Joe Dassin	Et si tu n’existais pas	10	10	10	9		37
4	Anastasia Stotskaya	Anna German	Эхо любви	8	7	6	5		26
5	Timur Rodriguez	Ray Charles	Georgia on My Mind/Hit the Road Jack	9	12	10	4	Polna, Chumakov	45
6	Sati Kazanova	PSY	Gangnam Style	5	4	5	7	Kortnev, Tsoy	31
7	Yulia Savicheva	Zemfira	Небо Лондона	7	8	8	8	Penkin, Kungurov	41
8	Alexey Kortnev	Sergey Shnurov	WWW	2	2	2	10		16
9	Anita Tsoy	Tamara Gverdtsiteli	Мамины глаза	6	5	7	12	Kazanova	35
10	Alexey Chumakov	Sting	Shape of My Heart	12	10	12	2	Rodriguez, Stotskaya	46

Total score after the eleventh week

1. Alexey Chumakov — 500 points
2. Timur Rodriguez — 454 points
3. Yulia Savicheva — 414 points
4. Anita Tsoy — 393 points
5. Anastasia Stotskaya — 347 points
6. Eva Polna — 298 points
7. Sergey Penkin — 292 points
8. Sati Kazanova — 273 points
9. Alexey Kortnev — 257 points
10. Eugeny Kungurov — 226 points

=== Week 12 (May 26)—Final ===
Guest — Victor Drobysh.

The winner between five best contestants (Chumakov, Rodriguez, Savicheva, Tsoy, Stotskaya) was defined by SMS-voting during the life-airing.

№	Participant	Image	Song	Place
1	Anastasia Stotskaya	Alla Pugacheva	Женщина, которая поёт	5
2	Anita Tsoy	Georg Ots	Mister's X Aria	4
3	Yulia Savicheva	Lyudmila Gurchenko	Молитва	2 (308 535 voices)
4	Timur Rodriguez	Eros Ramazzotti and Cher	Più che puoi	3 (141 480 voices)
5	Alexey Chumakov	Philipp Kirkorov	Жестокая любовь	1 (331 652 voices)

After the finalists' appearances were displayed hours concours performances

№	Participant(s)	Image	Song
1	Lyudmila Artemieva, Yulia Kovalchuk, Varvara and Fabrika band	Buranovskiye Babushki	Party for Everybody
2	Sergey Penkin and Alexey Kortnev	Thomas Anders and Dieter Bohlen (Modern Talking)	You're My Heart, You're My Soul
3	Aleksandr Revva	Mikhail Boyarsky	Романс Теодоро / Ланфрен-ланфра / Дуэт де Тревиля и д’Артаньяна / Смерть Констанции
4	Sati Kazanova and Eva Polna	María Mendiola and Mayte Mateos (Baccara)	Yes Sir, I Can Boogie
5	Eugene Kungurov and Lyubov Kazarnovskaya	Andrea Bocelli and Sarah Brightman	Time to Say Goodbye
6	Gennady Khazanov	Arkady Raikin	Добрый зритель в девятом ряду

== Top 3 Best results ==
Celebrity	Best results						
Celebrity	Best	Points	2 place	Points	3 place		Points
Alexey Chumakov	Aleksander Serov	58	Ilya Lagutenko	51	Lyubov Uspenskaya		51
Yulia Savicheva	Alla Pugacheva	72	Freddie Mercury	52	Stas Mikhaylov		42
Timur Rodriguez	Lyudmila Gurchenko	61	Nyusha	49	James Brown	Ray Charles	45
Anita Tsoy	Alla Pugacheva	47	Viktor Tsoi	47	Tina Turner		40
Anastasia Stotskaya	Larisa Dolina	39	Philipp Kirkorov	36	Svyatoslav Vakarchuk		36
Eva Polna	Valery Meladze	57	Cesária Évora	45	Edita Piekha		33
Sergey Penkin	Elton John	48	Louis Armstrong	35	Klavdiya Shulzhenko		30
Sati Kazanova	Sofia Rotaru	32	PSY	31	Laima Vaikule		30
Alexey Kortnev	Andrei Mironov	47	Garik Sukachov	45	Ella Fitzgerald		34
Evgeny Kungurov	Joe Dassin	37	Seryoga	37	Muslim Magomayev		27

Highest scoring performance
