= Tonev =

Tonev (Bulgarian: Тонев) is a Bulgarian masculine surname, its feminine counterpart is Toneva. It may refer to

- Aleksandar Tonev (born 1990), Bulgarian football player
- Dimo Tonev (born 1964), Bulgarian volleyball player
- Irina Toneva (born 1977), Russian singer
- Krasimira Toneva
- Nikola Tonev (born 1985), Macedonian football player
- Tsvetelin Tonev (born 1992), Bulgarian football player
