= Kazanov =

Kazanov (Russian: Казанов) is a Slavic masculine surname; its feminine counterpart is Kazanova, and it Latvian version is Kazanovs. It may refer to

- Igors Kazanovs (born 1963), Latvian hurdler
- Milko Kazanov (born 1970), Bulgarian sprint canoer
- Sati Kazanova (born 1982), Russian singer, fashion model, actress and TV personality
