= Hi-Fi (band) =

Russian pop dance group

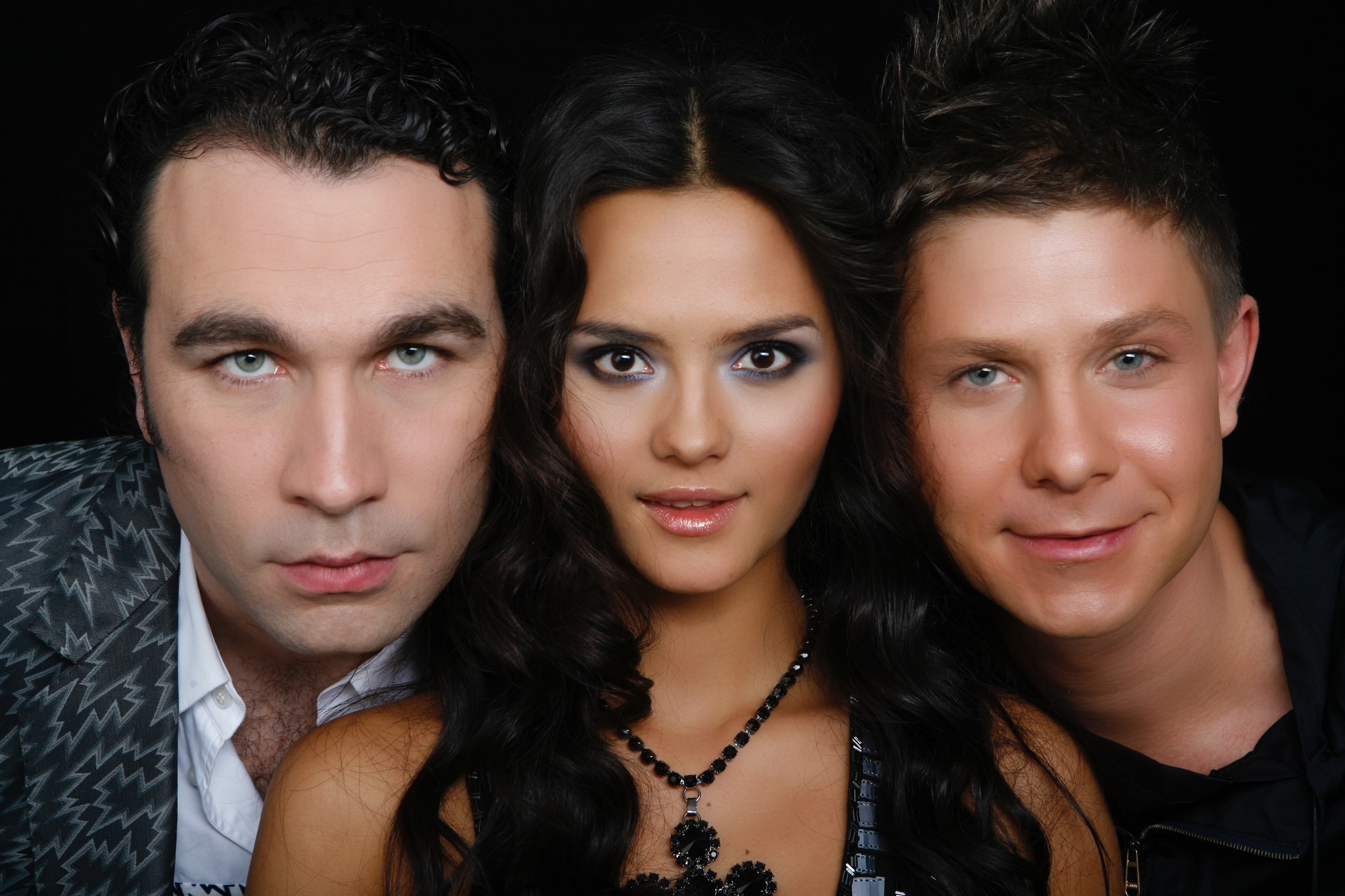

Background information
- Origin: Russia
- Genres: Pop, dance
- Years active: 1998–present
- Labels: Real Records, Iceberg Records
- Members: Timofey Pronkin (1998–present); Olesya Lipchanskaya (2010–present)
- Past members: Mitya Fomin (1998–2009); Oksana Oleshko (1998–2003); Tatiana Tereshina (2003–2005); Katya Lee (2006–2010); Kyril Kolgushkin (2009–2011)

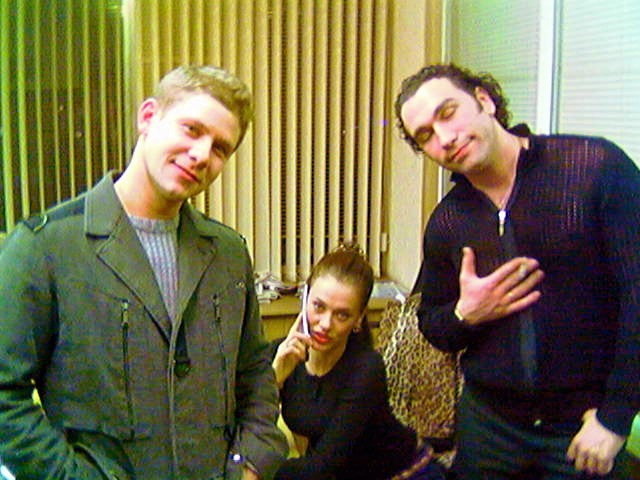
Hi-Fi in 2005

Hi-Fi is a Russian dance pop group established in 1998, founded by composer Pavel Esenin and songwriter and producer Eric Chanturia. The concept of the group consisted of the male leader and two supportive dance-performers until 2006, when Katya Lee joined the group. Lee started her career in the band with the solo song "Vzletai". From then on, the female and male vocals were equal. When Katya Lee left, the group went back to the old concept of the male singing.

== Members ==
- 1998-2003: Timofey Pronkin, Mitya Fomin, Oksana Oleshko (Original line-up)
- 2003-2005: Timofey Pronkin, Mitya Fomin, Tatiana Tereshina (the latter replacing Oksana Oleshko)
- 2006-2009: Timofey Pronkin, Mitya Fomin, Katya Lee
- 2009-2010: Timofey Pronkin, Katya Lee, Kyril Kolgushkin (the latter replacing Mitya Fomin)
- 2010-2011: Timofey Pronkin, Kyril Kolgushkin, Olesya Lipchanskaya (the latter replacing Katya Lee)
- 2011–present: Timofey Pronkin, Olesya Lipchanskaya (a duo after Kyril Kolgushkin leaving)

== Discography ==
=== Studio albums ===
1999: Первый контакт / Perviy Kontakt / First Contact
Singles:

- Ты прости / Ty Prosti / Forgive (1998)
- Не дано / Ne Dano / Not Given (1998)
- Беспризорник / Besprizornik / Homeless Child (1999)

1999: Репродукция / Reprodukciya / Reproduction
Singles:

- Про лето (Бумеранг) / Pro Leto (Bumerang) / About Summer (Boomerang) (1999)
- Чёрный ворон / Chorniy Voron / Black Crow (1999)

2001: Запоминай / Zapominay / Remember
Singles:

- Он / On / Him (2000)
- Глупые люди / Glupiye Lyudi / Stupid People (2000)
- За мной / Za Mnoy / Follow Me (2000)
- Так легко / Tak Legko / So Easy (2001)

=== Non-album singles ===
- 2002: Средняя школа № 7 / Srednyaya Shkola Nomer Sem' / High School #7
- 2002: Я люблю / Ya Lyublyu / I Love
- 2004: Седьмой лепесток / Sedmoy Lepestok / The Seventh Petal
- 2004: Билет / Bilet / Ticket
- 2004: Беда / Beda / Trouble
- 2005: Берега / Berega / Coasts
- 2006: Взлетай / Vzletay / Take Off
- 2006: По следам / Po Sledam / Following The Footsteps
- 2007: Право на счастье / Pravo Na Schastye / The Right To Happiness
- 2008: Мы не ангелы / My Ne Angely / We're No Angels
- 2018: Разбуди меня / Razbudi Menya / Wake Me Up (feat. Mitya Fomin & Pavel Esenin)
- 2020: Дом / Dom / Home

== Awards and nominations ==
Year	Awards	Song / Album / Artist	Category	Results
1999	Golden Gramophone Awards	Чёрный ворон / Chorniy Voron / Black Crow	Song	Won
1999	Stopudoviy Hit (100% Hit)	Беспризорник / Besprizornik / Homeless Child	Song	Won
1999	Song of the Year	Беспризорник / Besprizornik / Homeless Child	Festival Laureate	Won
2000	Golden Gramophone Awards	За мной / Za Mnoy / Follow Me	Song	Won
2000	Stopudoviy Hit (100% Hit)	За мной / Za Mnoy / Follow Me	Song	Won
2000	Song of the Year	За мной / Za Mnoy / Follow Me	Song	Won
2000	Song of the Year	Глупые люди / Glupiye Lyudi / Stupid People	Festival Laureate	Won
2001	Bomba Goda (Blast of the Year)	Так легко / Tak Legko / So Easy	Song	Won
2001	Night Life Awards	Hi-Fi	Club Group	Won
2001	Song of the Year	Всё в огонь (Песня царевны) / Vsyo v Ogon’ (Pesnya Tsarevny) / Into The Fire (Song of the Princess)	Festival Laureate	Won
2001	Song of the Year	Бомбей / Bombey / Bombay	Festival Laureate	Won
2002	Golden Gramophone Awards	Средняя школа № 7 / Srednyaya Shkola Nomer Sem’ / High School #7	Song	Won
2002	Song of the Year	Средняя школа № 7 / Srednyaya Shkola Nomer Sem’ / High School #7	Festival Laureate	Won
2002	Song of the Year	Почтовый поезд / Pochtoviy Poezd / Mail Train	Festival Laureate	Nominated
2002	Song of the Year	Я люблю / Ya Lyublyu / I Love	Festival Laureate	Won
2003	Bomba Goda (Blast of the Year)	Средняя школа № 7 / Srednyaya Shkola Nomer Sem’ / High School #7	Song	Won
2003	Popov Prize	Средняя школа № 7 / Srednyaya Shkola Nomer Sem’ / High School #7	Radio Hit	Won
2003	Dvizhenie (Movement)	Hi-Fi		Won
2004	Golden Gramophone Awards	Седьмой лепесток / Sedmoy Lepestok / The Seventh Petal	Song	Won
2004	Stopudoviy Hit (100% Hit)	Билет / Bilet / Ticket	Song	Won
2004	Bomba Goda (Blast of the Year)	Седьмой лепесток / Sedmoy Lepestok / The Seventh Petal	Song	Won
2004	Song of the Year	Седьмой лепесток / Sedmoy Lepestok / The Seventh Petal	Festival Laureate	Won
2004	Song of the Year	Билет / Bilet / Ticket	Festival Laureate	Won
2005	Muz-TV Awards	Hi-Fi	Best Dance Group	Won
2005	Bomba Goda (Blast of the Year)	Билет / Bilet / Ticket	Song	Won
2008	World Fashion TV	Hi-Fi	The Most Fashionable Group	Nominated
