= Fabrika =

Russian girl group

Fabrika Фабрика
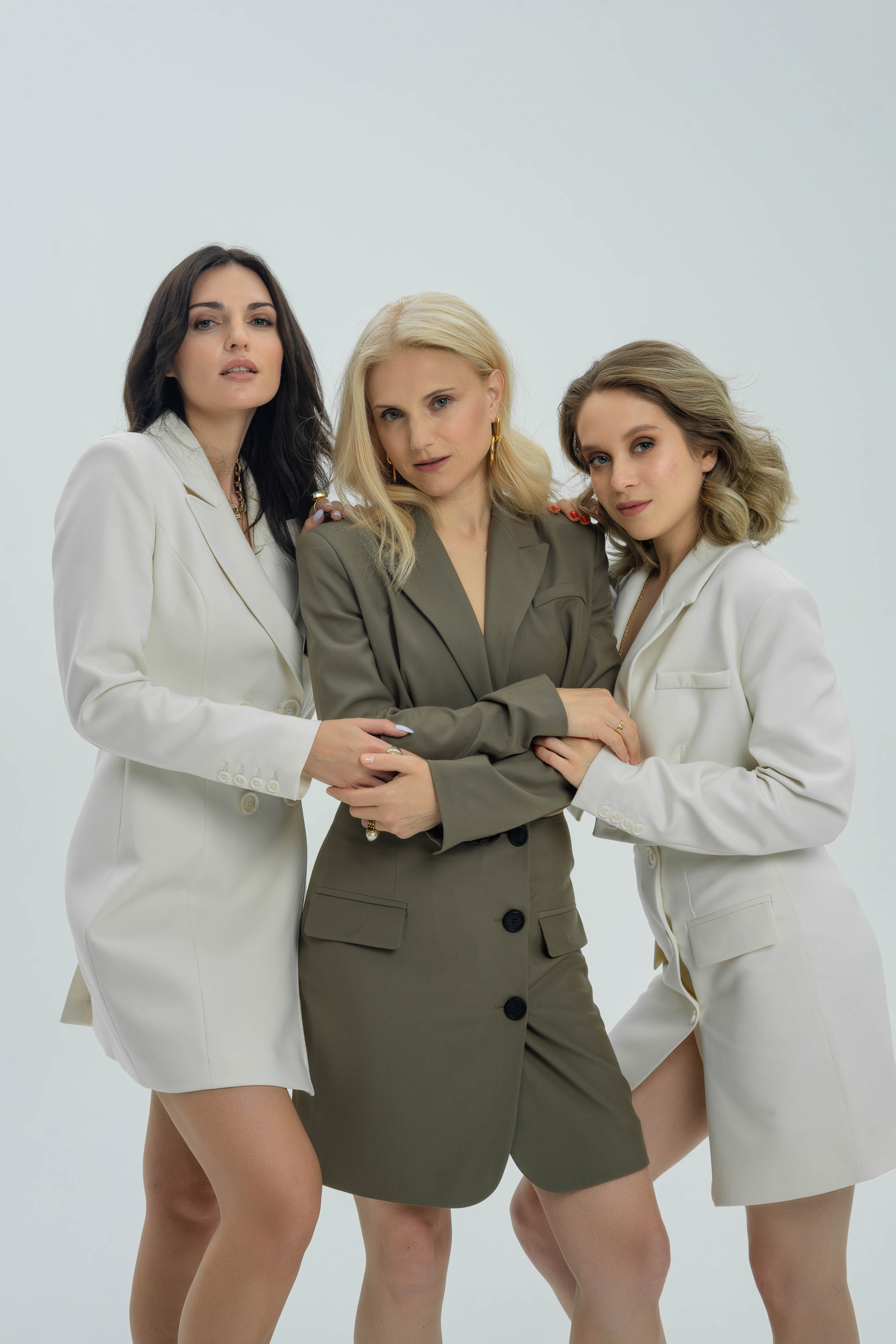
- Fabrika in 2022

Background information
- Origin: Moscow, Russia
- Genres: Pop, Europop, pop folk
- Years active: 2002 — present
- Label: OOO Production centre I. Matvienko
- Members: Irina Toneva; Ekaterina Moskaleva; Valeria Devyatova; Ksenia Larina
- Past members: Maria Alalykina (2002—2003); Sati Kazanova (2002—2010); Alexandra Savelyeva (2002—2019); Katya Lee (2010—2014); Oleksandra Popova (2014—2021); Mariya Honcharuk (2019—2022)
- Website: http://www.mfabrika.ru/

Fabrika (Russian: Фабрика; Factory in English) is a Russian pop girl group, originally from Moscow. It was formed in 2002 by four female participants of the first season of the Russian musical reality show Fabrika Zvyozd – Irina Toneva, Sati Kazanova, Alexandra Savelyeva and Maria Alalykina. The line-up has had several profound changes since then. Long a fully Russian group, Fabrika later acquired two Ukrainian-born members, Oleksandra Popova (2014-2021) and Mariya Honcharuk (2019-2022). As of 2019, Toneva was the only original member of the line-up.

In its more than two decades of activity, the group has released three albums: Devushki fabrichnye (2003), My takie raznye (2008) and Ne rodis' krasivoy (2017). Among their most successful singles are "Pro lyubov", "Devushki fabrichnye", "Ne vinovataya ya", "Ne rodis' krasivoy" and "Sekret".

== History ==
=== 2002-2003: Formation, Devushki fabrichnye and Alalykina's departure ===
In 2002, Irina Toneva, Sati Kazanova, Alexandra Savelyeva and Maria Alalykina all auditioned as soloists for the first season of the Russian music reality show Fabrika Zvyozd. All four were chosen to be among the last sixteen contestants of the first season, starting on 13 October 2002.

Toneva, Kazanova, Savelyeva and Alalykina all managed to reach the 8th reporting concert, where they were put into different groups. There, Toneva was paired as a duet with Pavel Artemiev, while Alalykina was paired as a duet with Alexey Kabanov. Savelyeva and Kazanova were put in a four-piece. The four-piece with Savelyeva and Kazanova sang "Pro lyubov" during the reporting concert, which eventually became Fabrika's first single. Unhappy with his choices, the musical producer of the first season of Fabrika Zvyozd, Igor Matvienko, rearranged the groups, creating a girl group with Toneva, Kazanova, Savelyeva and Alalykina instead. Named Fabrika, the four-piece performed two songs during the final and eventually placed second behind Korni.

In May 2003, Alalykina left Fabrika to focus on her studies and private life, where she later converted to Islam and moved to Dagestan. In 2020, during a television reunion at Segodnya vecherom, Toneva, Savelyeva and Kazanova said that they had no contact with Alalykina and had not seen her in over a decade. Matvienko added that Alalykina was a "person that was not ready for the show business".

After Alalykina's departure, Fabrika became a trio, as Matvienko decided against finding a replacement. Instead, the recording of Fabrika's first album continued without Alalykina. In November 2003, the group released their debut album Devushki fabrichnye, which has been noted as one of the best Russian albums released in the 2000s. Subsequently, the group released their eponymous single "Devushki fabrichnye", which became one of their biggest hits to date.

=== 2004-2010: "Ne vinovataya ya", My takie raznye and Kazanova's departure ===
Continuing their large commercial output, Fabrika released three commercial singles in 2004. Next to that, the group continued touring throughout the Commonwealth of Independent States. Their 2004 single "Lyolik" won a Golden Gramophone Award. Their May 2004 single "Rybka" reached no. 7 at the Russian TopHit radio charts. In 2005, the group released their single "Ne vinovataya ya", for which they also recorded the music video together with Bondarchuk. The song and music video acquired a large commercial success in Russia, remaining their third-most aired single on Russian radio.

The group slightly reduced their output in 2007, but eventually recorded their second album My takie raznye, which was released in 2008. On 13 January 2008, Fabrika performed at the Russian Winter Festival in London, England.

In May 2010, Kazanova announced her departure from the group, stating that she wanted to embark on a solo career. Matvienko invited Katya Lee to take Kazanova's spot.

=== 2011-2019: "Ne rodis' krasivoy", short hiatus and comeback ===
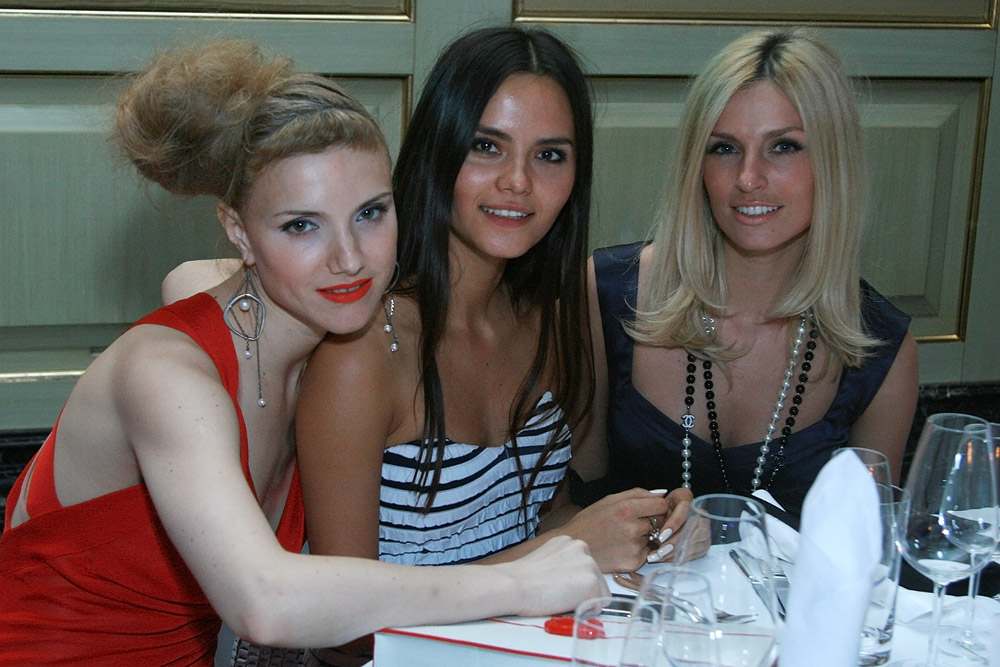
Fabrika in 2010, from left to right: Toneva, Lee and Savelyeva.

The commercial output of the group decreased during this period, but with "Ne rodis' krasivoy", the group achieved a top 40 radio hit. The music video for the song attracted over 100 million views, becoming one of the most-watched Russian music videos in 2013 on YouTube. During the recording of the music video in July 2013, Lee injured her spine, leading the group to go on a hiatus for the rest of the year. Savelyeva started her solo career the same year.

In February 2014, Lee announced her departure from the group. She was replaced by Ukrainian-born Oleksandra Popova, who previously auditioned for Nu Virgos, but had been eliminated during the second round of the final. Popova's debut was on the single "Sekret", which followed the same airplay success as "Ne rodis krasivoy".

Between 2015 and 2017, Fabrika's output again decreased. In 2016 and 2017, the group released one single each year, albeit both singles – "A ya za toboy" and "Babochki", which entered the top 50 of the TopHit airplay charts.

In 2018, their follow-up single "Vova" was less successful. In May 2018, the group re-released two of their most successful older singles; "Pro lyubov" and "Devushki fabrichnye", alongside a new single "5 minut". This was subsequently followed by "Mogla kak mogla" in June 2018.

In February 2019, Savelyeva announced her departure from the group, citing pregnancy as the main reason. For some time, an employee of Matvienko's production company, Antonina Klimenko, took her spot until a proper replacement was found. In October 2019, Ukrainian singer Mariya Honcharuk was announced as Savelyeva's replacement, leaving Toneva to be the only original member of Fabrika.

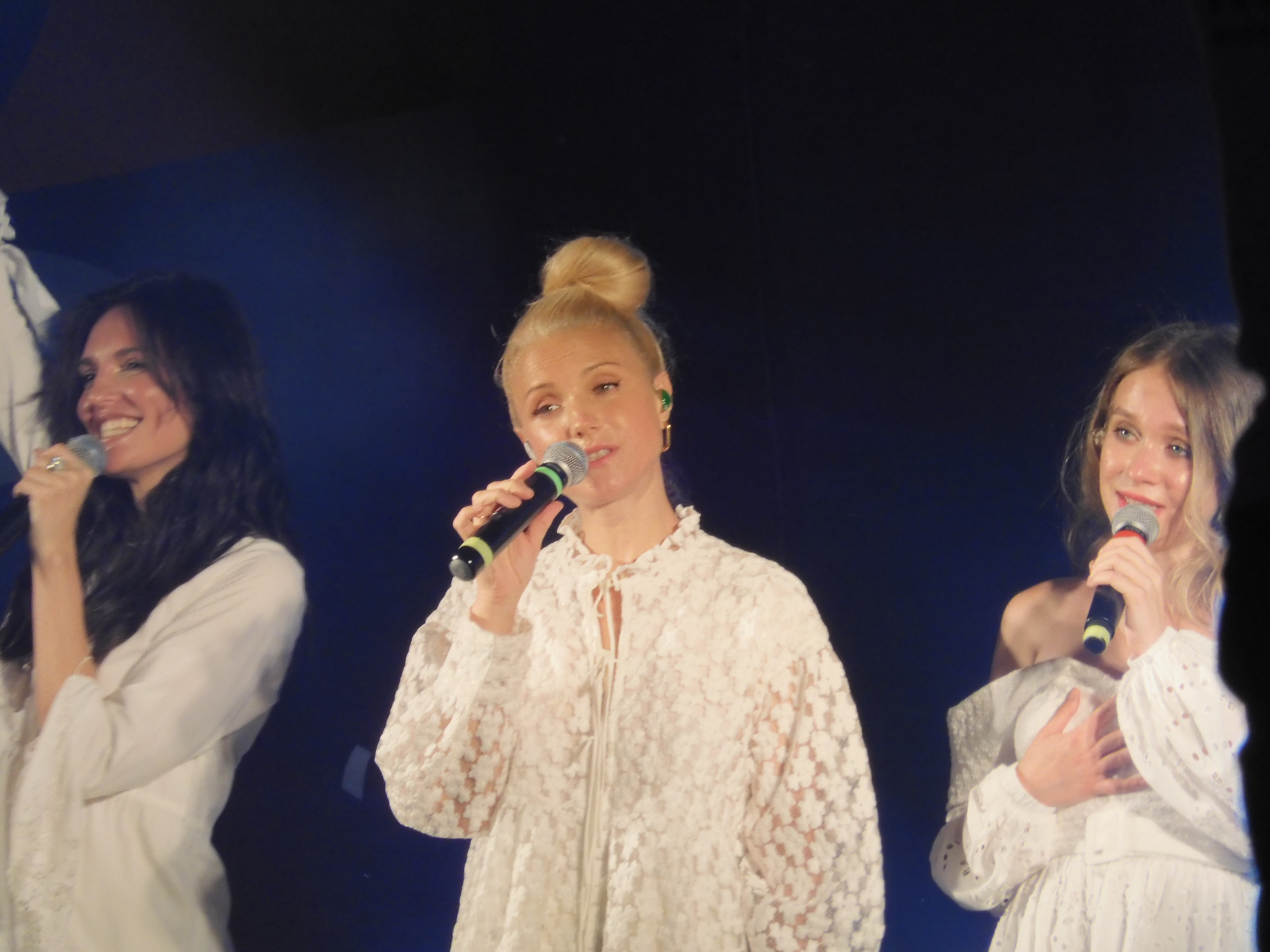
Fabrika on 6 August 2022, performing in Yoshkar-Ola

=== 2020-present: Line-up changes ===
In July 2020, Fabrika and its former members Sati Kazanova and Alexandra Savelyeva took part in a special broadcast about Fabrika Zvyozd during Segodnya vecherom. When Toneva was asked by Maxim Galkin about the age discrepancy between her and the other two members, she answered; "I don't remember". When further pressed for an answer, Matvienko replied: "2.5 years". This led to criticism of Galkin on social media for pressing ahead with the question.

In March 2021, Popova left the group to start a solo career. She was replaced by Russian singer Valeriya Devyatova, a former member of Soprano Turetskogo. In February 2022. it was announced that Maria Goncharuk had left the group due to a disagreement with the management on the development of the group. In March 2022. the group performed for the first time with new member Ekaterina Moskaleva. In April and May 2022, Fabrika participated in a series of concerts organised in Russia, in support of the 2022 Russian invasion of Ukraine.

== Membership ==
=== Current members ===
- Irina Toneva (born 27 June 1977, in Golitsyno-2, Russian SSR) is one of the original members of Fabrika. She auditioned for the first season of Fabrika Zvyozd, becoming one of the contestants. Prior to Fabrika Zvyozd, Toneva worked in a factory.
- Ekaterina Moskaleva
- Valeriya Devyatova (born 11 May 1989, in Leninsk Kuznetsky) replaced Oleksandra Popova when she left in 2021.

=== Past members ===
- Maria Alalykina (born 27 April 1983, in Moscow) was one of the original members of Fabrika. She auditioned for the first season of Fabrika Zvyozd, becoming one of the contestants. Alalykina left Fabrika in May 2003, becoming the first member to leave. Following her departure, Alalykina converted to Islam and later moved to Dagestan.
- Sati Kazanova (born 2 October 1982, in the village of Verkhniy Kukurzhin, Baksansky District, Kabardino-Balkaria) was one of the original members of Fabrika. She auditioned in the first season of Fabrika Zvyozd and became one of the contestants. Prior to the show, she studied academic vocals at the Kabardino-Balkar School of Culture and Art. Kazanova left in 2010, establishing a solo career.
- Katya Lee (born 7 December 1984, in Tyrnyauz, Kabardino-Balkaria) replaced Kazanova in 2010. Lee is of Polish, Russian, Korean and Turkish descent and previously worked as a singer for the Russian disco-pop group Hi-Fi prior to joining Fabrika. She was left injured in 2013, and ultimately left Fabrika in 2014.
- Alexandra Savelyeva (born 26 December 1983, in Moscow) was one of the original members of Fabrika. She auditioned for the first season of Fabrika Zyozd, becoming one of the contestants. Prior to the show, she studied Folk Music at the Gnessin Musical College. Savelyeva stayed in the group until 2019. She was replaced by Mariya Honcharuk.
- Oleksandra Popova (born 28 June 1991, in Krasnyi Luch, Ukrainian SSR) was Fabrika's first Ukrainian-born member. She replaced Katya Lee in February 2014. Prior to Fabrika, Popova had auditioned to be a new member of the pop group Nu Virgos in 2013, where she caught the attention of Toneva, Savelyeva and Matvienko. In March 2021, she left the group to start a solo career.
- Mariya Honcharuk (born 14 May 1990, in Popudnea, Ukrainian SSR). She replaced Alexandra Savelyeva in October 2019.

== Artistry and musical style ==
Fabrika's initial releases combined Russian pop music with elements of Russian folk and R&B. They were especially noted for their strong vocal capabilities. Style-wise, they stood out from other Russian-singing all-female collectives at the time, including Blestyashchiye and Nu Virgos, who were mostly influenced by Western and American pop music.

== Music videos ==
- Про любовь / Pro Lyubov / About love
- Море зовёт / More Zovyot / The sea calls
- Девушки фабричные / Devushki Fabrichnye / Factory girls
- Рыбка / Rybka / Little fish
- За горизонт / Za gorizont / Over the horizon (feat. ИВАНУШКИ Int.)
- Не виноватая я / Ne Vinovataya Ya / I'm not guilty
- Романтика / Romantika / Romance
- Зажигают огоньки / Zazhigayut Ogonki / Light come on
- Мы Такие Разные / My Takie Raznye / We're so different
- Али Баба / Ali Baba
- Я тебя зацелую / Ya Tebya Zatseluyu / I kiss you
- Остановки / Ostanovki / Stops (with group Venera)
- Фильмы о любви / Filmi o Lyubvi / Films about love
- Она - это я / Ona - Eto Ya / She - That's Me
- Не родись красивой / Ne rodis krasivoï / Don't be born beautiful
- Секрет / Sekret / Secret
- А я за тобой / A ya za toboy / And I'm behind you
- Полюбила / Polyubila / Fell in love
- Бабочки / Babochki / Butterflies
- Вова Вова / Vova Vova
- Могла как могла / Mogla kak mogla / As I Could
- Мама Молодая / Mama Molodaya / Young Mom
- Позвони, будь посмелей / Pozvoni, bud posmeley / Call be bold
- Кабы Я Была / Kabi Ya Bila / If I Only Were (feat. Гоша Гуценко)

== Albums ==
- Девушки фабричные (Devushki Fabrichnye / Factory Girls) (2003)
1. Девушки фабричные / Devushki Fabrichnye / Factory Girls
2. Про любовь / Pro Lyubov / About Love
3. 5 минут / 5 Minut / 5 Minutes
4. Море зовет / More Zovet / The Sea Calls
5. Ой, мама, я влюбилась / Oi, Mama, Ya Vlyubilas / Oh, Mama, I Fell In Love
6. Заболела тобой / Zabolela Toboy / Sick of you
7. Мыльные пузыри / Mylnye Puzyri / Soap Bubbles
8. Все не всерьез / Vse Ne Vserez / All Not Seriously
9. Он / On / He
10. Отпустить любовь / Otpustit Lyubov / To release Love
11. Лелик / Lyolik / Lyolik (song about members of boy band Korni)
12. Понимаешь / Ponimaesh / You understand
- Мы Такие Разные (My Takie Raznye / We're So Different) (2008)
1. Мы такие разные / My Takie Raznye / We're So Different
2. Не виноватая я / Ne Vinovataya Ya / I'm Not Guilty
3. Рыбка / Ribka / Fishy
4. Романтика / Romantika / Romantics
5. Зажигают огоньки / Zazhigayut Ogonki / Flames Ignite
6. Je T'aime / I Love You
7. Белым-белым / Belym-belym / White-white
8. Давай с тобой поговорим / Davay s Toboy Pogovorim / Let's Talk With You (cover of song by Oleg Mityaev)
9. Малина / Malina / Raspberries
10. Облако волос / Oblako Volos / Cloud of Hair (cover of song by Ivanushki International)
11. Девушки фабричные / Devushki Fabrichnye / Factory Girls
12. Про любовь / Pro Lyubov / About Love
13. Море зовет / More Zovet / The Sea Calls
14. Лелик / Lelik / Lelik
15. Он / On / He
16. Понимаешь / Ponimaesh / Understand

== Awards ==
1. 2004 — Stopudovy Hit (Russian: Стопудовый хит)
2. 2004 — Zolotoi Grammofon (Russian: Золотой граммофон; Golden Gramophone in English)
3. 2005 — Zolotoi Grammofon
4. 2005 — Glamour: Pop Group the Year
5. 2010 — Starlook: Most Stylish Group in Showbusiness
6. 2014- Zolotoi Grammofon"Golden Gramophone"
