= Eva Polna =

Russian singer, composer and songwriter

Eva Polna Ева Польна
- Born: Eva Leonidovna Polna; Leningrad, Russian SFSR, Soviet Union
- Genres: Dance-pop
- Occupations: Singer, composer, songwriter
- Instrument: Vocals
- Years active: 1994–present
- Label: Velvet Music
- Formerly of: Guests from the Future
- Website: evapolna.ru

Eva Leonidovna Polna (Russian: Ева Леонидовна Польна) is a Russian singer, composer and songwriter. Born in Leningrad (now Saint Petersburg), Polna was a member of the former Russian musical duo Guests from the Future between 1996 and 2009. In 2013, Polna was most rotated musical artist from Russia and CIS. Also in 2013, Polna participated in the first season of Russian TV show Odin v odin!.

A song by Vintage titled "Eva", is dedicated to her.

== Personal life ==
In 2001, Eva Polna came out as bisexual. In 2005, she gave birth to first of her two daughters, Eveline, father being singer Denis Klyaver of Chai Vdvoyom. In 2007 she gave birth to her second daughter, Amalia. Amalia's father is a Russian businessman, Sergey Pilgun, with whom Polna was married until April 2010, when they divorced.

== Discography ==
=== With Gosti iz budushchego ===
Studio albums

- Через сотни лет… (1997)
- Время песок... (1998)
- Беги от меня (1999)
- Зима в сердце (2000)
- Это сильнее меня, часть 1 (2000)
- Ева (2002)
- Это сильнее меня, часть 2 (2003)
- Больше чем песни (2005)
- За звездой (2007)

Compilations

- Best (2001)
- Любовное настроение/Любовные истории (2003)

Remix albums

- Правила движения (2004)
- Реальна только музыка (2007)

Singles

- Я твоя киска (2008)

=== Solo career ===
Studio albums

- Поёт любовь (2014)
- Поёт любовь LIVE Сrocus City Hall 2014 (2015)
- Лирика (Неизданное)
- Открытый Космос (2023)

Singles

- Какая нелепость (with Viktor Saltykov) (2004)
- Не могу я теперь без любви (with Sergey Zhukov) (2007)
- Парни не плачут (2009)
- Не расставаясь (2010)
- Миражи (2010)
- Корабли (2011)
- Отбой (with Denis Klyaver) (2011)
- "Je T'aime (Я тебя тоже нет)" (2011)
- Весь мир на ладони (2012)
- Рыбка (tribute to Mikhey) (2012)
- Молчание (2013)
- Это не ты (2014)
- Выход (2014)
- Слова (2014)
- На последнем дыхании (2014)
- Поёт любовь (2014)
- Делай любовь со мной (2014)
- Мало (2015)

== Videography ==
=== With Gosti iz budushchego ===
- Беги от меня (1999)
- Не любовь (1999)
- Зима в сердце (1999)
- Игры (2000)
- Ты где то (2000)
- Это сильнее меня (2000)
- Так отважно (2001)
- Он чужой (2002)
- Метко (2002)
- Почему ты? (2003)
- Грустные сказки (2004)
- Лучшее в тебе (2005)
- Я рисую (2006)
- Мама гуд-бай! (2006)
- Реальна только музыка (2007)
- Я не для тебя (2008)
- Я твоя киска (2008)

=== Solo career ===
- Парни не плачут (2009)
- Не расставаясь (2010)
- Миражи (2010)
- Я тебя тоже нет (Je t’aime) (2011)
- Весь мир на ладони моей (2012)
- Мало (2016)

== Charts ==
Year	Title	Chart positions							Album
Year	Title	Russia & CIS (Tophit General Top-100)	Russia (Tophit Moscow Top-100)	Russia (Tophit Saint Petersburg Top-100)	Ukraine (Tophit Ukrainian Top-100)	Ukraine (Tophit Kyiv Top-100)	Radio charts on requests TopHit 100	Russia & CIS (Tophit General on Year)	Album
2003	"Новогодняя песня»	5							
2004	"Грустные сказки»	1							
2004	"Всё решено»	3							
2005	"Лучшее в тебе»	2							
2007	"Самый любимый враг»	4							
2008	"Я не для тебя»	6							
2009	"Парни не плачут»	13	62	11	–	8	2	79	
2010	"Не расставаясь»	8	74	18	–	66	6	80	Поёт любовь
2010	"Миражи»	88	–	–	67	64	28	–	Поёт любовь
2011	"Корабли»	96	–	–	–	–	12	–	Поёт любовь
2011	"Отбой" feat. Denis Klyaver	223	–	–	–	–	165	–	Поёт любовь
2011	"Я тебя тоже нет (Je T`aime)»	1	9	7	1	1	1	9	Поёт любовь
2012	"Весь мир на ладони моей»	1	2	3	1	1	1	2	Поёт любовь
2013	"Молчание»	14	20	40	23	59	3	63	Поёт любовь
2014	"Это не ты»	82					4		Поёт любовь

== Awards ==
=== With Gosti iz budushchego ===
- 1999 — Golden Gramophone Award (RUS) for the song "Я с тобой»
- 2000 — Golden Gramophone Award (RUS) for the song "Ты где-то»
- 2001 — Golden Gramophone Award (RUS) for the song "Ундина»
- 2002 — Golden Gramophone Award (RUS) for the song "Он чужой»
- 2003 — Golden Gramophone Award (RUS) for the song "Почему ты, почему навсегда»
- 2009 — Golden Gramophone Award (RUS) for the song "За звездой»

=== Solo career ===
- 2011 – Golden Gramophone Award (UKR) for the song "Корабли»
- 2012 – Fashion People Awards-2012 in category "Fashion voice Female»
- 2012 – Golden Gramophone Award (Saint Petersburg) for the song "Я тебя тоже нет»
- 2012 — Диплом Красной звезды for the song "Я тебя тоже нет»
- 2013 – Red Star statuette for the song "Весь мир на ладони моей", for January and February
- 2013 – Top Hit Music Awards за беспрецедентный рост ротации своих треков в радиоэфире в 2012 году
- 2013 – Top Hit Music Awards как автору и исполнителю самой заказываемой на радио песни — "Я тебя тоже нет»
- 2013 – Top Hit Hall Of Fame за выдающийся вклад в развитие российской популярной музыки
- 2013 — Диплом и статуэтка национального чарта "Красная Звезда" for the song "Весь мир на ладони моей»
