= Dnevniki =

Studio album by Korni
- Released: 2005
- Recorded: 2005
- Genre: Alternative rock Hard rock Pop rock Electronica; Contemporary R&B
- Label: Igor Matvienko Production Centre
- Producer: Igor Matvienko

Korni chronology
Na veka (2003)	Dnevniki (2005)

Dnevniki (Russian: Дневники, Diaries) is Russian pop rock band Korni's second album. The album "Dnevniki" is a solo records of each participant quartet.

== Track listing ==
=== Compositions by Pavel Artemyev ===
1. Кто полетит? / Kto Poletit? / Who Will Fly?
2. Не слепи / Ne Slepi / Don't Blind
3. До золы / Do Zoly / To Ashes
4. Крылья / Kryl'ya / Wings
5. Февраль / Fevral' / February
6. Что-то ещё / Chto-to Yescho / Something Else
7. Завтра я / Zavtra Ya / Tomorrow I
8. Москва бледнеет на зиму / Moskva Bledneet Na Zimu / Moscow Grows Pale For Winter
9. Лови моё / Lovi Moyo / Catch My
10. Ты послушай / Ty Poslushay / Listen
11. Летать, падать (рыбам) / Letat', Padat' (Rybam) / Flying, Falling (For Fishes)
12. От рассвета / Ot Rassveta / From Dawn
13. Поколение / Pokoleniye / Generation
14. Америка / Amerika / America
15. Любовь / Lyubov' / Love
16. 25 этаж (remix) / Dvadtsat' Pyatiy Etazh / 25th Floor
17. 25 этаж (original version) / Dvadtsat' Pyatiy Etazh / 25th Floor (by Matvienko and Zhagun)

=== Compositions by Alexandr Astashenok ===
1. Небо-земля / Nebo-Zemlya / Sky-Earth
2. Я кричу / Ya Krichu / I Scream
3. Вспоминай меня / Vspominay Menya / Remember Me
4. Прощай, моя душа / Proschay, Moya Dusha / Farewell, My Soul
5. Сказка / Skazka / Fairytale
6. Осень здесь / Osen' Zdes' / Autumn Is Here
7. Я обязательно вернусь / Ya Obyazatel'no Vernus' / I'll Definitely Come Back
8. Последний бой / Posledniy Boy / One Last Fight
9. 25 этаж (remix)
10. 25 этаж (original version) (by Matvienko and Zhagun)

=== Compositions by Alexandr Berdnikov ===
1. Intro
2. Ты прости / Ty Prosti / Forgive
3. В небо / V Nebo / Into The Sky
4. Стань моей / Stan' Moyey / Become Mine
5. Навсегда / Navsegda / Forever
6. Поднимите ваши руки / Podnimite Vashi Ruki / Raise Your Hands
7. Очи чёрные / Ochi Chorniye / Dark Eyes
8. Вопрос-ответ / Vopros-Otvet / Question And Answer
9. Голос небес / Golos Nebes / Voice Of The Sky
10. Льёт дождь / L'yot Dozhd / Rain Falls
11. Последний поцелуй / Posledniy Potseluy / One Last Kiss
12. Ты красивая / Ty Krasivaya / You're Beautiful
13. Ты прости (remix)
14. 25 этаж (remix)
15. 25 этаж (original version) (by Matvienko and Zhagun)

=== Compositions by Alexey Kabanov ===
1. Горькая луна / Gor'kaya Luna / Bitter Moon
2. Человечек / Chelovechek / Little Man
3. Такси / Taksi / Taxi
4. The return
5. А ты ушла / A Ty Ushla / And You're Gone
6. Дождливая ночь / Dozhdlivaya Noch' / Rainy Night
7. Blow my mind
8. Та девушка (original mix) / Ta Devushka / That Girl
9. Про несчастную любовь / Pro Nechastnuyu Lyubov' / Hopeless Love
10. От фанов / Ot Fanov / From Fans
11. 25 этаж (remix)
12. 25 этаж (original version) (by Matvienko and Zhagun)
