= Irina Toneva =

Russian singer (born 1977)

Irina Toneva Ирина Тонева
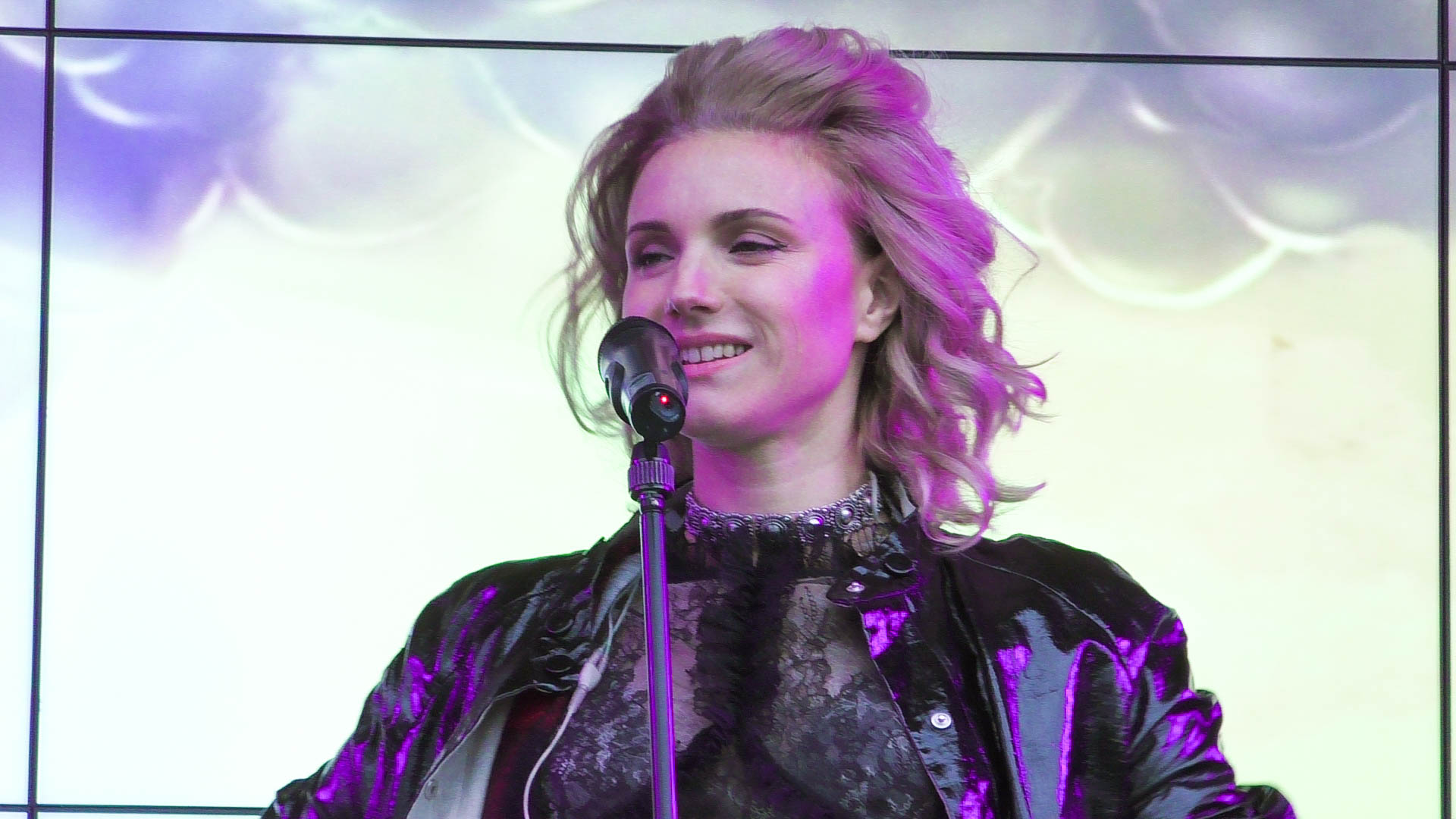
- Born: 27 June 1977 (age 49); Krasnoznamensk, Moscow Oblast, RSFSR, Soviet Union
- Years active: 2002–present
- Height: 1.71 m (5 ft 7 in)
- Musical career
- Genre: Pop
- Member of: Fabrika

Irina Ilyinichna Toneva (Russian: Ири́на Ильи́нична То́нева; born 27 June 1977 in Krasnoznamensk, Moscow Oblast, Soviet Union) is a Russian singer, one of three vocalists of girl group Fabrika (Factory in English). In 2002 she took part in first Star Factory project where Fabrika was formed and finished second.

Before taking part in Star Factory, Ira worked in a clothing factory and an orchestra.

Born 27 June 1977 in Krasnoznamensk, Moscow Oblast, Soviet Union.

== Biography ==
In 1999, she graduated from the Moscow State University of Design and Technology with a degree in chemical engineering in leather and fur, and worked for several years at the Kuntsevo tannery.

In 2002, she participated in the first season of the contest "Fabrika zvezd" ("Star Factory") and came in 2nd place as a member of the group "Fabrika". Toneva's popularity came from the song "You Know," sung in a duet with the future lead singer of the band "Korni" Pavel Artemyev.

In 2005, she took part in a reality show "Сердце Африки" (The Heart of Africa). Repeatedly included in the ratings of the sexiest women in the Russian-language version of magazines "FHM" and "Maxim".

In 2013 she joined the Herman Sidakov School of Acting and on March 29, 2014, she made her theatrical debut in the title role in the experimental play "A Tale of Sonechka.

In 2016, she started a solo career (project TONEVA, style of music: indie-pop with elements of electro and synth-pop), but stays in the group "Fabrika".
