= Guests from the Future =

Gosti iz budushchego Гости из будущего

Background information
- Origin: Saint Petersburg, Russia
- Genres: Pop, synthpop, dance-pop
- Years active: 1996–2009
- Labels: FG «Nikitin» Tantsevalniy Ray; WWW RECORDS
- Members: Eva Polna; Yury Usachyov

«Gosti iz budushchego» (Russian: «Гости из будущего», lit.: «Guests from the Future») was a Russian pop band that was formed in 1996 in Saint Petersburg. It was founded by musicians Yury Usachyov and Evgeny Arsentyev. After 1998, the band consisted of two members: Yury Usachyov and Eva Polna, until its dissolution in 2009. Experimenting with dance pop, drum and bass, and jungle styles, they became known in 1999 with the hit "Беги от меня", Begi ot menya, 'Run Away from Me' and the release of the self-titled album.

In spring of 2009 Eva Polna announced split-up of the group and her new solo career.

== Discography ==
Studio albums

- 1997: Через сотни лет / Cherez Sotni Let / In Hundreds Of Years
- 1998: Время песок / Vremya Pesok / Time Is Sand
- 1999: Беги от меня / Begi Ot Menya / Run Away From Me
- 2000: Зима в сердце / Zima V Serdtse / Winter In My Heart
- 2000: Это сильнее меня, часть 1 / Eto Silnee Menya: Chast' Pervaya / It's Stronger Than Me: Part One
- 2002: Ева / Eva / Eva
- 2003: Это сильнее меня, часть 2 / Eto Silnee Menya: Chast' Vtoraya / It's Stronger Than Me: Part Two
- 2005: Больше чем песни / Bol'she Chem Pesni / More Than Songs
- 2007: За звездой / Za Zvezdoy / To The Stars

Compilations

- 2001: Best
- 2003: Любовное настроение / Lyubovnoye Nastroeniye / In The Mood For Love

Remix albums

- 2004: Правила движения / Pravila Dvizheniya / Traffic Rules
- 2007: Реальна только музыка / Real'na Tol'ko Muzyka / Only Music Is Real
