= Katya Lee =

Russian singer (born 1984)

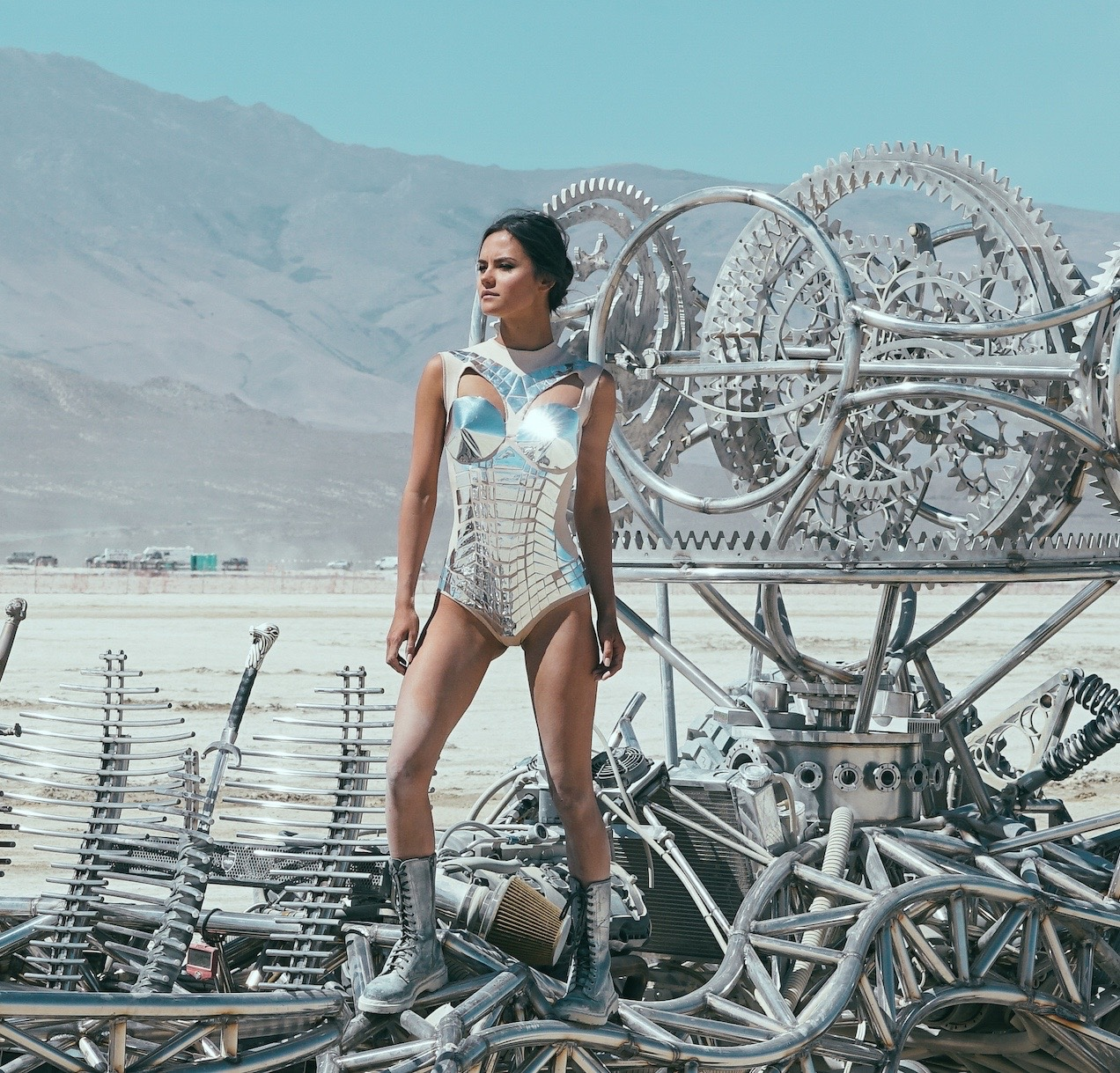
- Backstage of Same Side music video

Background information
- Born: Ekaterina Lee (Екатерина Валерьевна Ли); 7 December 1984 (age 41)
- Origin: Kabardino-Balkaria
- Genres: Electronic experimental dance
- Occupations: Singer, songwriter, fashion designer
- Years active: 2002–present
- Website: http://www.katyalee.com

Ekaterina Valeryevna Lee (Russian: Екатерина Валерьевна Ли, Ekaterina Valeryevna Li) is a Russian singer-songwriter and fashion designer, professionally known as Katya Lee (Катя Ли), or KATYA.

== Career ==
According to a video she posted to Facebook, she is of mixed Korean and Russian descent.

=== Hi-Fi (2006–2010) ===
Lee began her career in 2006, after being discovered by a producer, while singing in a nightclub in Saint-Petersburg. The next day she was flown to Moscow, where she became a member of the pop/dance band Hi-Fi.

=== Fabrika (2010–2014) ===
In 2010, she left Hi-Fi after being invited to join the all-girl pop act Fabrika (Фабрика), which was enjoying a period of success. As a member of Fabrika, Lee was featured in worldwide media, including Billboard, Play Boy, Rolling Stone, FHM, Hello, Ok, Grazia, Maxim, Star hit, and others. Fabrika performed at: TV music series "The Treasure of the Nation" on channel 2 Russia, TV Show Star Factory on Channel 1 Russia, Saturday Night Live Channel 2 Russia, Comedy Club on TNT Channel Russia, Music Box Russia, MTV Russia, STS Russia, REN-TV Russia.

In 2010, Lee began designing clothes for Fabrika.

=== Recent (2014–present) ===
In 2014, she left Fabrika and moved to New York to work on her solo career after releasing the single "Ne rodis krasivoy" single which got nominated for and won a Golden Gramophone award in 2014.

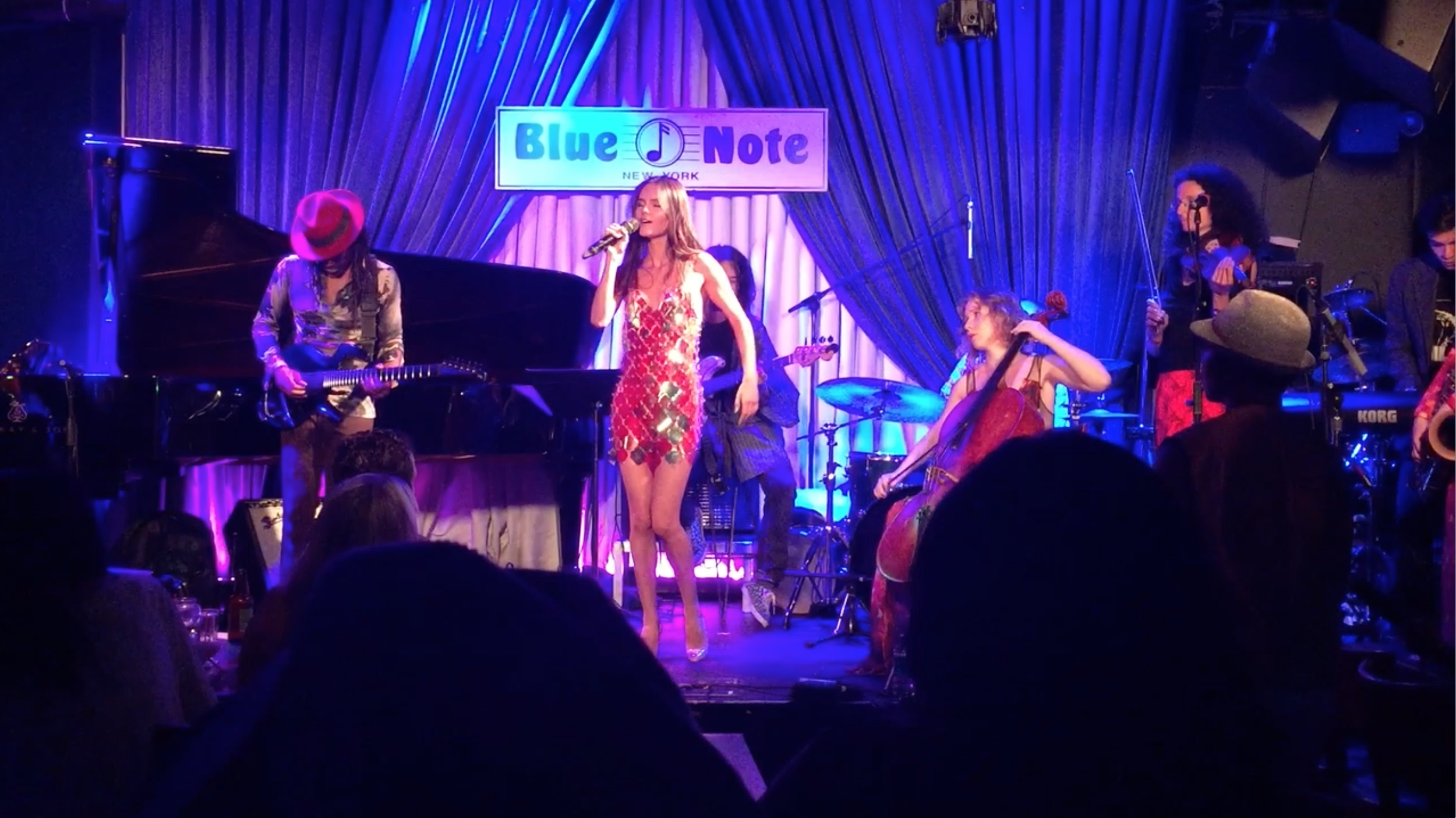
Katya performing on stage at Blue Note café

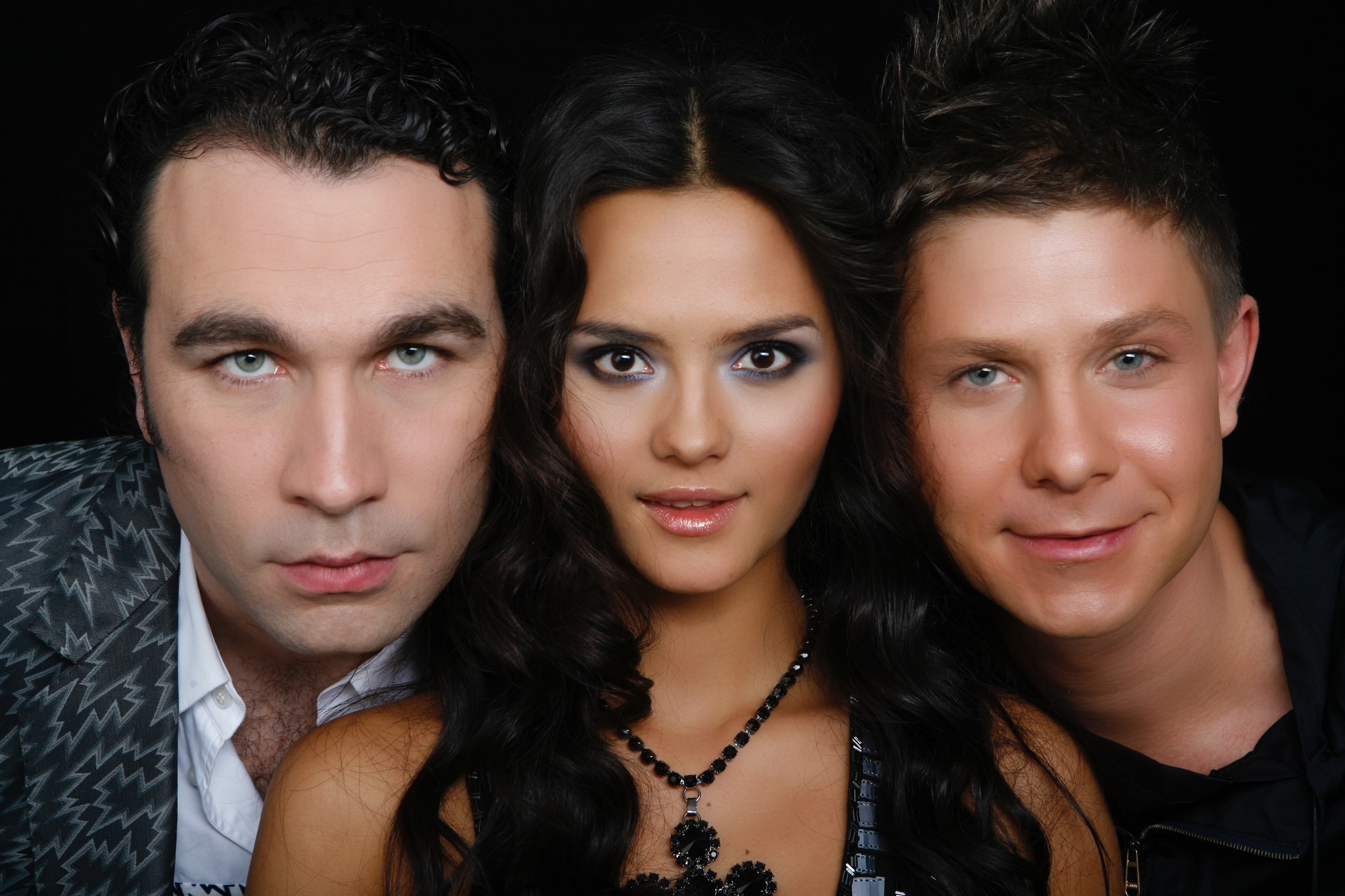
Katya in band Hi-Fi

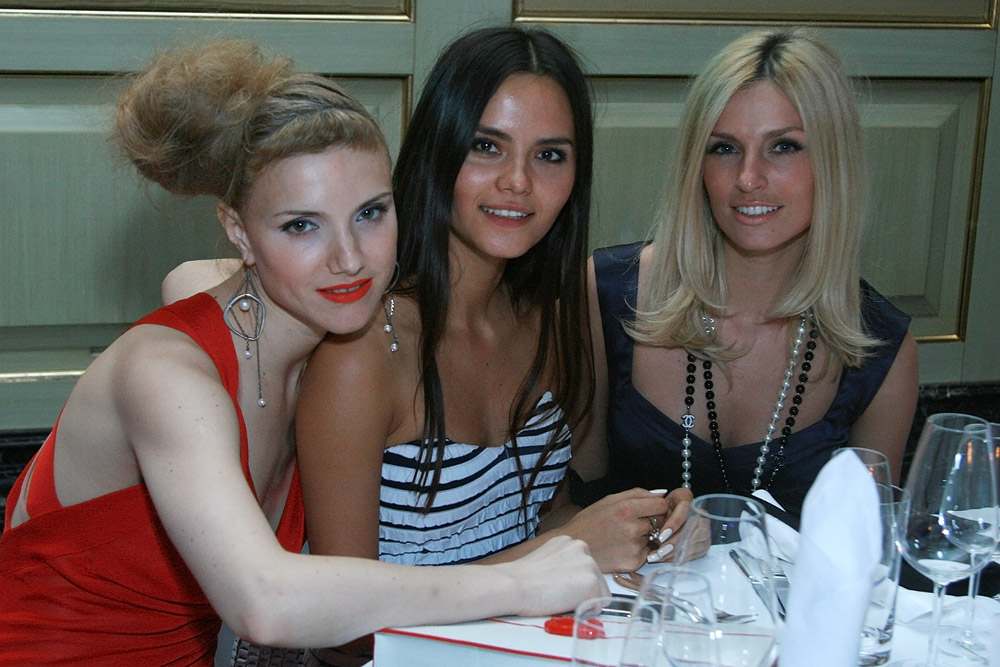
Katya in band Fabrika

Her first performance in the United States was at the Blue Note Jazz Club in New York's West Village performing her original compositions. She later performed at Cielo nightclub in NYC's meatpacking district, Output in Brooklyn's trendy Williamsburg, followed by numerous other performances including Burning Man 2015 and then again at Burning Man 2016 on the White Ocean stage.

KATYA is currently working on a Solo EP with Ryan Guldemond of Mother Mother and two-time Grammy-winning producer Matt Shane.

== Discography ==
- Vzletai (Взлетай) 2006
- Po sledam (По следам) 2006
- Pravo na schastie ( Право на счастье ) 2007
- Nam pora (Нам пора) 2008
- Mi ne angeli (Мы не ангелы) 2008
- Sedmoi lepestok Remix (Седьмой лепесток) 2008
- Zabitii sentyabr (Забытый сентябрь) 2009
- Ali-Baba (Али-Баба) 2009
- Zaceluu (Я тебя зацелую) 2010
- Ostanovki (Остановки) 2011
- Ona eto ja (Она это я) 2012
- Filmi o lubvi (Фильмы о любви) 2012
- Ne rods krasivoi (Не родись красивой) 2013
- Same Side 2015
- Lovely Day 2015
- Little Phoenix 2015
- A Dream 2016
