= Eka Mamaladze =

Georgian singer and pianist

Eka Mamaladze ეკა მამალაძე
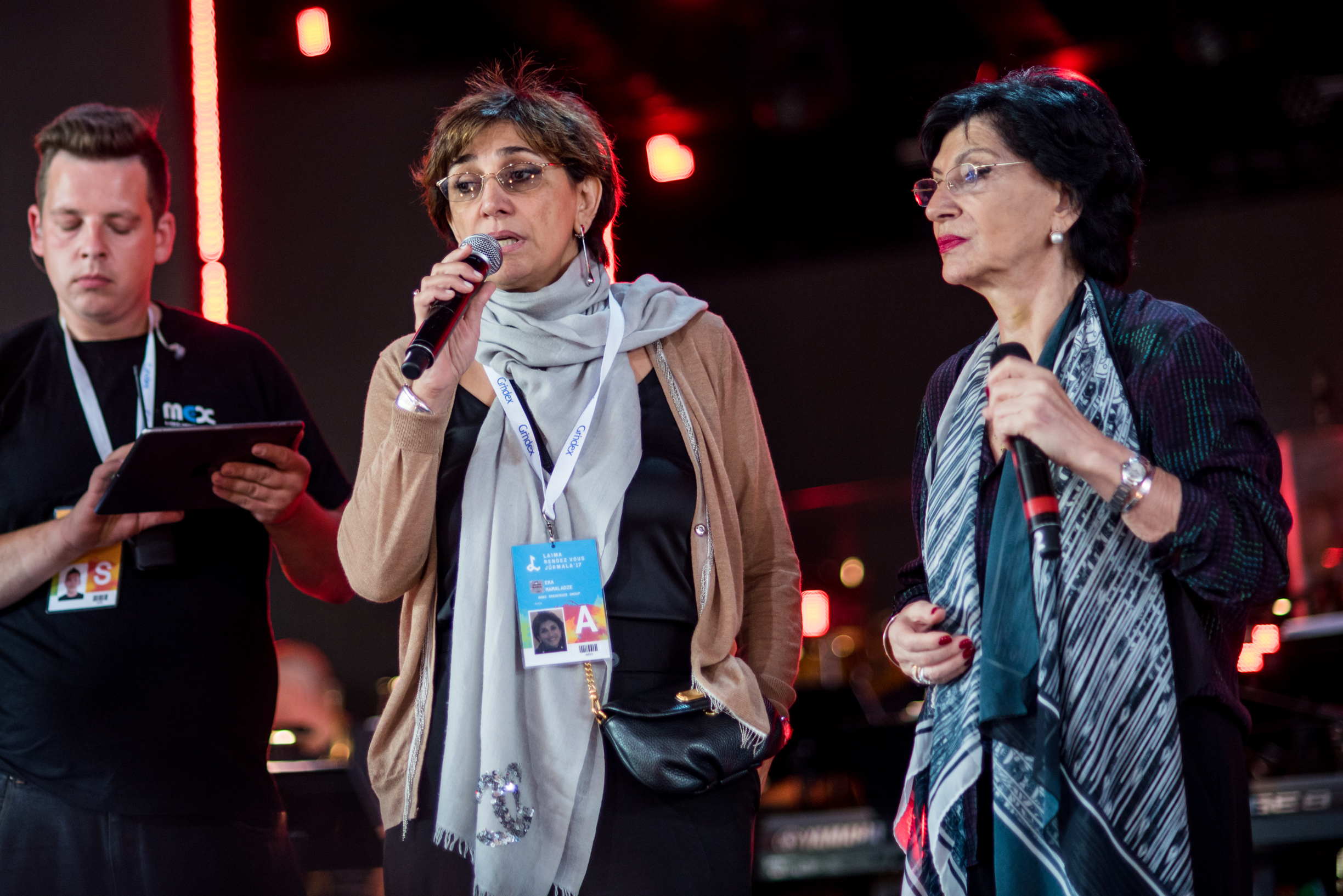
- Eka Mamaladze (center) and Nani Bregvadze's rehearsal at Laima Rendez Vous Jurmala 2017

Background information
- Born: 27 March 1960 (age 65); Tbilisi, Georgian SSR, Soviet Union
- Genres: Romantic music
- Occupation: Singer
- Instrument(s): Vocals, piano
- Years active: 1980–present

Eka Mamaladze (Georgian: ეკა მამალაძე; born 27 March 1960) is a Georgian singer and pianist. She performs Georgian and Russian romances – both in a duet with her mother Nani Bregvadze, with daughter Natalia Kutateladze, and solo.
