= Mitya Fomin =

Russian singer (born 1974)

Mitya Fomin Митя Фомин
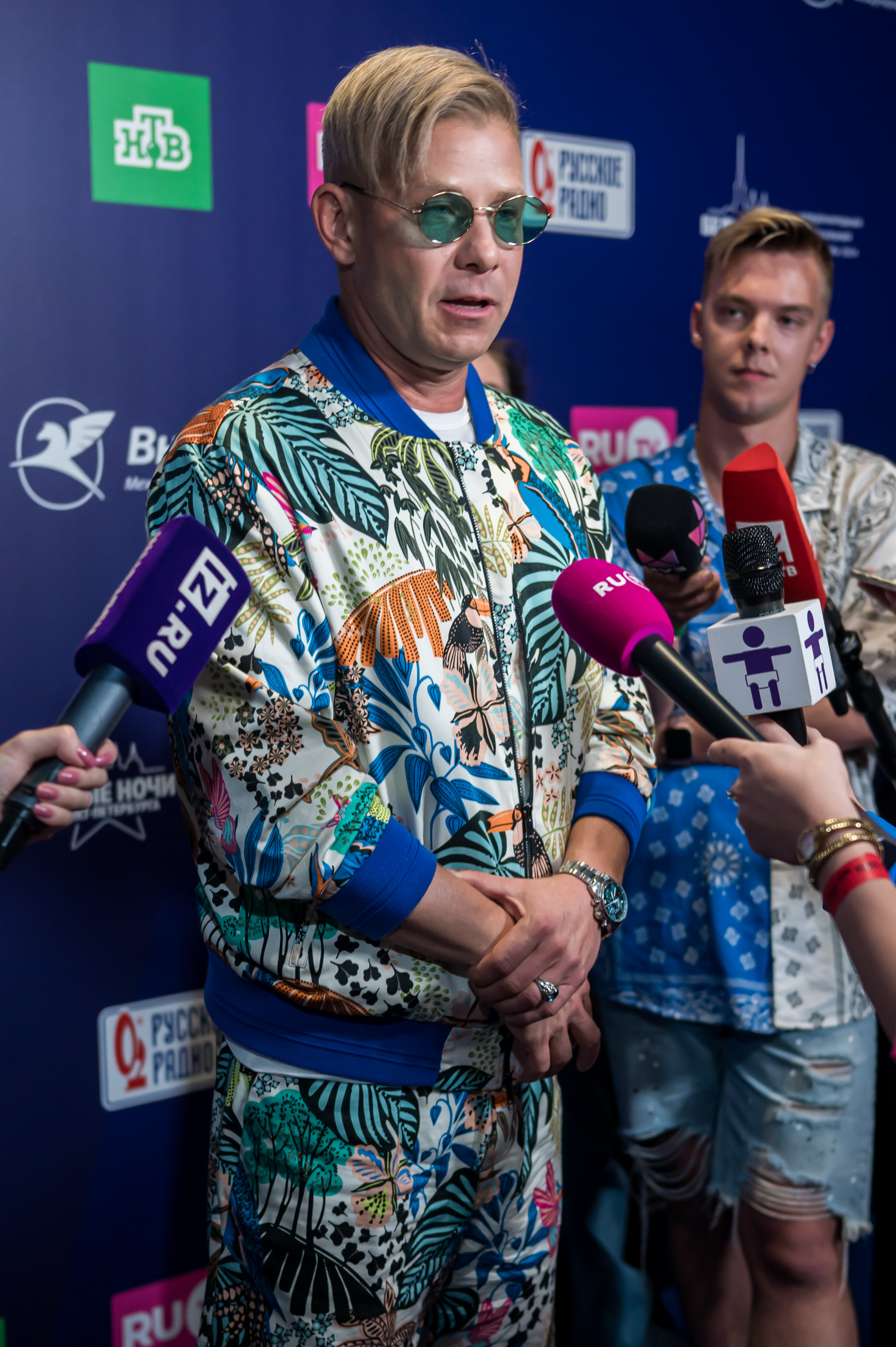

Background information
- Born: Dmitri Fomin; 17 January 1974 (age 52)
- Origin: Novosibirsk, RSFSR, USSR
- Genres: Pop, R&B, Soul, Fusion
- Occupations: Singer, dancer, record producer
- Years active: Hi-Fi (1998 – 2009); Solo (2009 – present)
- Labels: Gala Records, All Star Music
- Website: mityafomin.ru

Dmitri Anatolevich Fomin (Russian: Дмитрий "Митя" Анатольевич Фомин; born 17 January 1974), known by his stage name Mitya Fomin, is a Russian solo singer, dancer and producer. Between 1998 and 2009, he was a member of the dance group Hi-Fi.

== Early life ==
He was born to Anatoly Fomin (1939-2014), an associate professor at the Institute of Communications and Tamara Fomina (1942), an engineer.

== With Hi-Fi ==
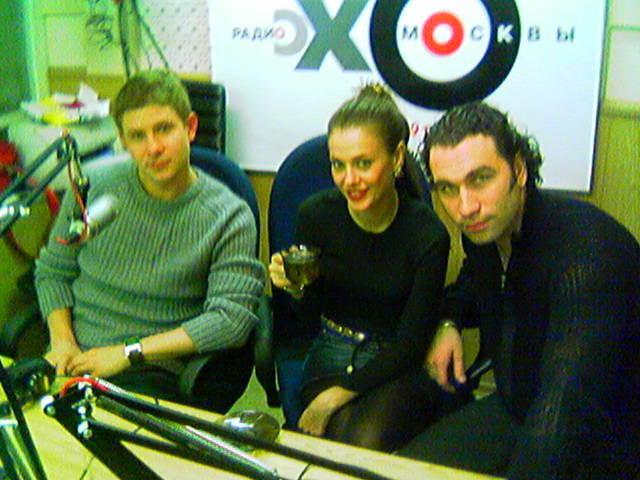
Mitya Formin as part of Hi-Fi

Later on, Mitya Fomin moved to Moscow where his friends producer Eric Chanturia and composer Pavel Esenin offered him to join Hi-Fi in 1998 with Oksana Oleshko and later on Tatyana Tereshina.

While in the group, Mitya started working with many writers and composers for his own work and decided to leave the group in January 2009 after more than 10 years with the band.

== Solo ==
In March 2009, he collaborated with songwriter and producer Maxim Fadeev in releasing his debut solo single "Две земли".

He released at the end of 2010 his debut solo album Так будет (meaning So it will be) that included his hits and other rhythmic, relax, ambient and easy dance songs. He also released single "Перезимуем" again featuring StuFF with a video directed by Mitya himself. He also collaborated with the Pet Shop Boys in his dance hit single "Огни большого города (Paninaro)" (Ogni Bolshogo Goroda meaning City Lights) and finally "Не манекен" with Christina Orsa (Кристина Орса) filmed in Hong Kong.

== Trivia ==
Besides directing many of his music videos, Mitya Fomin is also directing videos for other artists, for example Yena's "Эксбой" (Exboy). He is also involved in 2011 series of Russian reality television show Жена напрокат.

From January 2018 to 2021, Fomin was banned for 3 years from entering Ukraine because of his claim (during a concert in Lviv) that since the 2014 Russian annexation of Crimea, Crimea is a "Russian territory." In April or May 2022, Fomin participated in a concert organized in order to support the 2022 Russian invasion of Ukraine.

== Awards and nominations ==
(For awards with Hi-Fi, see Hi-Fi)

Year	Awards	Song / Album / Artist	Category	Results
2010	Golden Gramophone Awards	"Everything will be good"	Song	Won
2010	God of Air	"That's It"	Radiohit	Nominated
2010	Song of the year	"Everything will be good"	Award winner	Won
2011	Muz-TV Awards	Mitya Formin	Breakthrough of the Year	Nominated
2011	Fashion People Awards	Mitya Formin	Fashion Breakthrough of the Year	Won
2011	RU.TV Awards	"Everything will be good"	Best ringtone	Nominated
2011	RU.TV Awards	Mitya Formin	Real coming	Won
2011	Golden Gramophone Awards	"City Lights (Paninaro)"	Song	Nominated
2011	OE Video Music Awards	"City Lights (Paninaro)"	The most stylish singer	Nominated
2011	OE Video Music Awards	"City Lights (Paninaro)"	Breakthrough of the Year	Nominated

== Discography ==
=== Albums ===
As Hi-Fi (studio albums)

- 1999: Первый контакт
- 1999: Репродукция
- 2001: Запоминай
- 2002: Новая коллекция 2002 (DJ remixes)

As Hi-Fi (collection albums)

- 1999: Звёздная серия
- 2002: Best
- 2005: Любовное настроение
- 2008: Best 1

Solo

Year	Album	Details	Notes
2010	Так будет	Date released: 27 July 2010; Label: Gala Records; Format: CD, Digital downloads	Tracklist: 1. Больше (feat StuFF); 2. Две Земли; 3. Тишина; 4. Вот И Все; 5. Все Будет Хорошо (feat StuFF); 6. Садовник; 7. Так Будет; 8. Смотри; 9. OK! (River Piano Version) feat Kirill Clash; 10. Две Земли (Vengerov & Fedoroff Remix); 11. Вот И Все (DJ Neitrino & Kirill Clash Remix)

=== Singles ===
As Hi-Fi

Year	Title	Album
1998	"Ты прости" (Ty prosti)	Первый контакт
1998	"Не дано" (Ne dano)	Первый контакт
1999	"Беспризорник" (Besprizornik)	Первый контакт
1999	"Про лето" (Pro leto)	Репродукция
1999	"Чёрный ворон" (Chornyy voron)	Репродукция
2000	"Он" (On)	Запоминай
2000	"Глупые люди" (Glupyye lyudi)	Запоминай
2000	"За мной" (Za mnoy)	Запоминай
2001	"Так легко" (Tak legko)	Запоминай
2002	"СШ No. 7 (А мы любили)" (SSH No. 7 (A my lyubili))	Best
2002	"Я люблю" (YA lyublyu)	Best
2004	"Седьмой лепесток" (Sed'moy lepestok)	Любовное настроение
2004	"Билет" (Bilet)	Best 1
2004	"Беда" (Beda)	Best 1
2005	"Берега" (Berega)	Best 1
2006	"Взлетай" (Vzletay)	Best 1
2006	"По следам" (Po sledam)	—
2007	"Право на счастье" (Pravo na schast'ye)	—
2008	"Седьмой лепесток" (Remix) (Sed'moy lepestok)	—
2008	"Мы не ангелы" (My ne angely)	—

Solo

Year	Title	Featuring	Album
2009	"Две земли" (Dve zemli)		Так будет
2010	"Вот и всё" (Vot i vse)		Так будет
2010	"Всё будет хорошо" (Vse budet horosho)	featuring StuFF	Так будет
2010	"Перезимуем" (Perezimuem)	featuring StuFF	–
2011	"Огни большого города (Paninaro)" (Ogni Bolshogo Goroda (Paninaro))	with Pet Shop Boys	–
2011	"Не манекен" (Ne maneken)	featuring Christina Orsa (Кристина Орса)	–
