= Natalia Kutateladze =

Georgian mezzo-soprano

Kutateladze singing the Habenera from Carmen in 2020

Natalia Kutateladze (Georgian: ნატალია ქუთათელაძე; born 1992 in Tbilisi) is a Georgian mezzo-soprano.

The granddaughter and daughter, respectively, of fellow Georgian singers Nani Bregvadze and Eka Mamaladze, Kutateladze studied at Tbilisi State Conservatoire, performing Mercedes from Bizet's Carmen and Marcellina from Mozart's The Marriage of Figaro at Tbilisi State Opera. In 2015, she moved to New York, studying at the Juilliard School with Edith Wiens and ultimately graduating there. At Juilliard, she sang the roles of Ottone from Handel's Agrippina, Minskwoman from Dove's Flight and Phèdre from Rameau's Hippolyte et Aricie.

In 2018–19, Kutateladze was a member of the Young Artists Studio at the Bavarian State Opera, performing Flora Bervoix from Verdi's La traviata and Frédéric from Thomas's Mignon, among others. She received the second prize in the 2020 "Tenor Viñas" competition at the Liceu in Barcelona, for which she performed "Fia dunque vero; O mio Fernando" from Donizetti's La favorita. In 2021, she sang the Mistress of the Novices in the Bavarian State Opera's production of Puccini's Suor Angelica.
