= All Star Music =

Independent music label

- Founded: 2018
- Founder: Dmitry Pavlov, Viktor Ustenko
- Genre: pop music
- Country of origin: Russia
- Location: Moscow, Russia
- Official website: allstarmusic.ru

The All Star Music is an independent music label that manages artists in Russia, the CIS, Europe and United States.

Among the artists who have released their releases on the label and collaborate with the company are A-Studio, Soso Pavliashvili, Mitya Fomin, Uma2rman, Jasmin, Diana Gurtskaya, Anna Sedokova, AISEL.
