= Habanera (aria) =

Aria from Georges Bizet's 1875 opera Carmen

Range	Tessitura

Habanera ("music or dance of Havana") is the popular name for "L'amour est un oiseau rebelle" (French pronunciation: [lamuʁ ɛt‿œ̃n‿wazo ʁəbɛl]; "Love is a rebellious bird"), an aria from Georges Bizet's 1875 opéra comique Carmen. It is the entrance aria of the title character, a mezzo-soprano role, in scene 5 of the first act.

== Background ==
The score of the aria was adapted from the habanera "El Arreglito ou la Promesse de mariage", by the Spanish musician Sebastián Iradier, first published in 1863, which Bizet believed to be a folk song. When others told him he had used something written by a composer who had died ten years earlier, he added a note about its derivation in the first edition of the vocal score which he himself prepared. Although the French libretto of the complete opéra comique was written by Henri Meilhac and Ludovic Halévy, the words of the habanera originated from Bizet. The Habanera was first performed by Célestine Galli-Marié at the Opéra-Comique on 3 March 1875. Bizet, having removed during rehearsals his first version of Carmen's entrance song, in 3/4 with a refrain in 6/8, rewrote the Habanera several times before he (and Galli-Marié) were satisfied with it. Nietzsche, an enthusiastic admirer of Carmen, commented on the "ironically provocative" aria evoking "Eros as conceived by the ancients, playfully alluring, mischievously demoniacal". Rodney Milnes, reviewing a range of interpretations on record, described the piece as "after all, ... a simple, teasingly articulated statement of fact, not an earth-shattering philosophical credo".

== Music ==
Although Bizet kept the basic layout of the Iradier song, which has each verse in D minor and each refrain in the tonic major, he let go of the long ritornelli and second half material, and, by adding chromaticism, variations in the refrain and harmonic interest in the accompaniment, made it a memorable number. The reharmonization, addition of triplets in the vocal line and the flute in its low register add to the effect. Despite the change in mode there is no actual modulation in the aria, and the implied pedal point D is maintained throughout. The vocal range covers D_{4} to F♯_{5} with a tessitura from D_{4} to D_{5}. Although Bizet borrowed the melody from the song by Iradier, he developed it "with his inimitable harmonic style and haunting habanera rhythm".

Natalia Kutateladze, 2020

The orchestration for the number consists of the two flutes, two oboes, two clarinets, two bassoons, four horns, timpani, triangle and tambourine, full strings, plus two pistons (trumpets – for the final chord only). The orchestral complement for the premiere run was 62 or 57 musicians in total (depending on whether the pit players doubled for off-stage music).

José is the only person on stage who pays no attention to Carmen while she sings the Habanera, and after she finishes she approaches him. In the following short spoken scene he tells her that he is making a chain to attach his épinglette (lapel pin), whereupon she calls him épinglier de mon âme (fastener of my soul) and throws a cassia flower at him, and the female chorus reprises the refrain L'amour est enfant de bohème, Il n'a jamais, jamais connu de loi, Si tu ne m'aimes pas, je t'aime, Si je t'aime, prends garde à toi! The refrain also returns briefly at the end of the act, in scene XI, No. 1 Final, where Carmen hums it (fredonnant) in the face of the lieutenant Zuniga.

== Words ==
Lyrics in parentheses are sung by the chorus.

[Récitative]
Quand je vous aimerai ?
Ma foi, je ne sais pas,
Peut-être jamais, peut-être demain...
Mais pas aujourd'hui, c'est certain !

[Habanera]
L'amour est un oiseau rebelle
Que nul ne peut apprivoiser,
Et c'est bien en vain qu'on l'appelle,
S'il lui convient de refuser;
Rien n'y fait, menace ou prière,
L'un parle bien, l'autre se tait;
Et c'est l'autre que je préfère,
Il n'a rien dit, mais il me plaît.

(L'amour est un oiseau rebelle) L'amour !
(Que nul ne peut apprivoiser,) L'amour !
(Et c'est bien en vain qu'on l'appelle,) L'amour !
(S'il lui convient de refuser.) L'amour !

L'amour est enfant de bohème,
Il n'a jamais, jamais connu de loi,
Si tu ne m'aimes pas, je t'aime,
Si je t'aime, prends garde à toi ! (Prends garde à toi !)
Si tu ne m'aimes pas,
Si tu ne m'aimes pas, je t'aime ! (Prends garde à toi !)
Mais si je t'aime, si je t'aime,
Prends garde à toi!

(L'amour est enfant de bohème,)
(Il n'a jamais, jamais connu de loi,)
(Si tu ne m'aimes pas, je t'aime;)
(Si je t'aime, prends garde à toi !) (Prends garde à toi !)

Si tu ne m'aimes pas,
Si tu ne m'aimes pas, je t'aime ! (Prends garde à toi !)
Mais si je t'aime, si je t'aime,
Prends garde à toi ! (à toi !)

L'oiseau que tu croyais surprendre
Battit de l'aile et s'envola,
L'amour est loin, tu peux l'attendre;
Tu ne l'attends plus, il est là !
Tout autour de toi, vite, vite,
Il vient, s'en va, puis il revient;
Tu crois le tenir, il t'évite;
Tu crois l'éviter, il te tient !

(Tout autour de toi, vite, vite,) L'amour !
(Il vient, s'en va, puis il revient;) L'amour !
(Tu crois le tenir, il t'évite;) L'amour !
(Tu crois l'éviter, il te tient !) L'amour !

L'amour est enfant de bohème,
Il n'a jamais, jamais connu de loi,
Si tu ne m'aimes pas, je t'aime,
Si je t'aime, prends garde à toi ! (Prends garde à toi !)
Si tu ne m'aimes pas,
Si tu ne m'aimes pas, je t'aime ! (Prends garde à toi !)
Mais si je t'aime, si je t'aime,
Prends garde à toi !

(L'amour est enfant de bohème,)
(Il n'a jamais, jamais connu de loi,)
(Si tu ne m'aimes pas, je t'aime,)
(Si je t'aime, prends garde à toi !) (Prends garde à toi !)

Si tu ne m'aimes pas,
Si tu ne m'aimes pas, je t'aime ! (Prends garde à toi !)
Mais si je t'aime, si je t'aime,
Prends garde à toi ! (à toi !)

[Recitative]
When will I love you?
Good Lord, I don't know,
Maybe never, maybe tomorrow...
But not today, that's for sure!

[Habanera]
Love is a rebellious bird
That none can tame,
And it is quite in vain that one calls it,
If it suits it to refuse;
Nothing to be done, threat or plea.
The one talks well, the other is silent;
And it's the other that I prefer,
He said nothing, but he pleases me.

(Love is a rebellious bird) Love!
(That none can tame,) Love!
(And it is well in vain that one calls it,) Love!
(If it suits it to refuse.) Love!

Love is a gypsy child,
It has never, never known a law,
If you don't love me, I love you,
If I love you, be on your guard! (Be on your guard!)
If you don't love me,
If you don't love me, then I love you! (Be on your guard!)
But if I love you, if I love you,
Be on your guard!

(Love is a gypsy child,)
(It has never, never known a law,)
(If you don't love me, I love you,)
(If I love you, be on your guard!) (Be on your guard!)

If you don't love me,
If you don't love me, I love you! (Be on your guard!)
But if I love you, if I love you,
Be on your guard! (Your guard!)

The bird you hoped to catch
Beat its wings and flew away,
Love is far, you can wait for it;
You no longer await it, there it is!
All around you, swift, swift,
It comes, goes, then it returns;
You think to hold it fast, it dodges you;
You think to dodge it, it holds you!

(All around you, swift, swift,) Love!
(It comes, goes, then it returns;) Love!
(You think to hold it fast, it dodges you;) Love!
(You think to dodge it, it holds you!) Love!

Love is a gypsy child,
It has never, never known a law,
If you don't love me, I love you;
If I love you, be on your guard! (Be on your guard!)
If you don't love me,
If you don't love me, then I love you! (Be on your guard!)
But if I love you, if I love you,
Be on your guard!

(Love is a gypsy child,)
(It has never, never known the law,)
(If you don't love me, then I love you,)
(If I love you, be on your guard!) (Be on your guard!)

If you don't love me,
If you don't love me, then I love you! (Be on your guard!)
But if I love you, if I love you,
Be on your guard! (Your guard!)
