= Nani Bregvadze =

Georgian Soviet singer and actress (born 1936)

Nani Bregvadze ნანი ბრეგვაძე
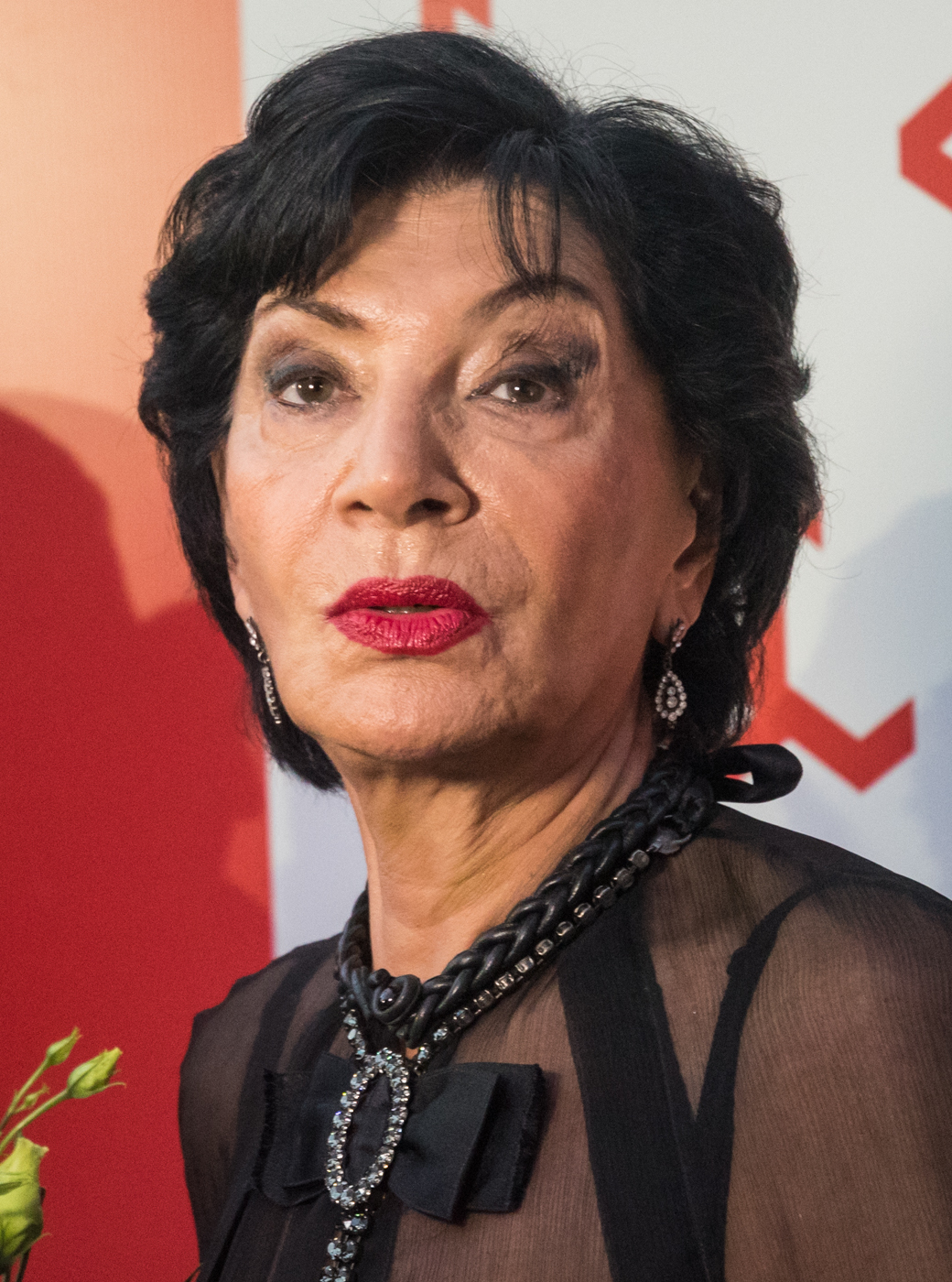
- Bregvadze in 2017

Background information
- Born: Nani Giorgis asuli Bregvadze; July 21, 1936 (age 90); Tbilisi, Georgian SSR, Soviet Union
- Genres: Classical, romance
- Occupations: Singer, pianist, music pedagogue
- Instruments: Singing, piano
- Years active: 1957–present

Nani Giorgis asuli Bregvadze (Note: Georgian: ნანი გიორგის ასული ბრეგვაძე, romanized: Nani Giorgis asuli Bregvadze; Russian: Нани Георгиевна Брегвадзе, romanized: Nani Georgiyevna Bregvadze.) (born 21 July 1936) is a Georgian and Soviet singer, pianist, music pedagogue, People's Artist of the USSR (1983).

She was born, raised, and started her career in Soviet Georgia in the USSR, then gained USSR-wide popularity during 1957 6th World Festival of Youth and Students. Bregvadze has performed with Georgian music group VIA Orera and as a solo artist.

Bregvadze's signature songs include "Snegopad" ("Snowfall"), "Bolshak" (later covered by Alla Pugacheva), and "Dorogoi Dlinnoyu" (adapted in English as "Those Were the Days"). After launching a successful solo career in the early 1970s, Bregvadze performed a great number of Russian and Gypsy romances. She was named a People's Artist of the USSR in 1983. As of 2007, Bregvadze lived in Moscow and held the chair in popular and jazz music at the Moscow State Art and Cultural University. She has been an honorary citizen of Tbilisi since 1995.

Her daughter Eka Mamaladze and her granddaughter Natalia Kutateladze are also singers.
