= Sergey Penkin =

Russian singer, composer and actor

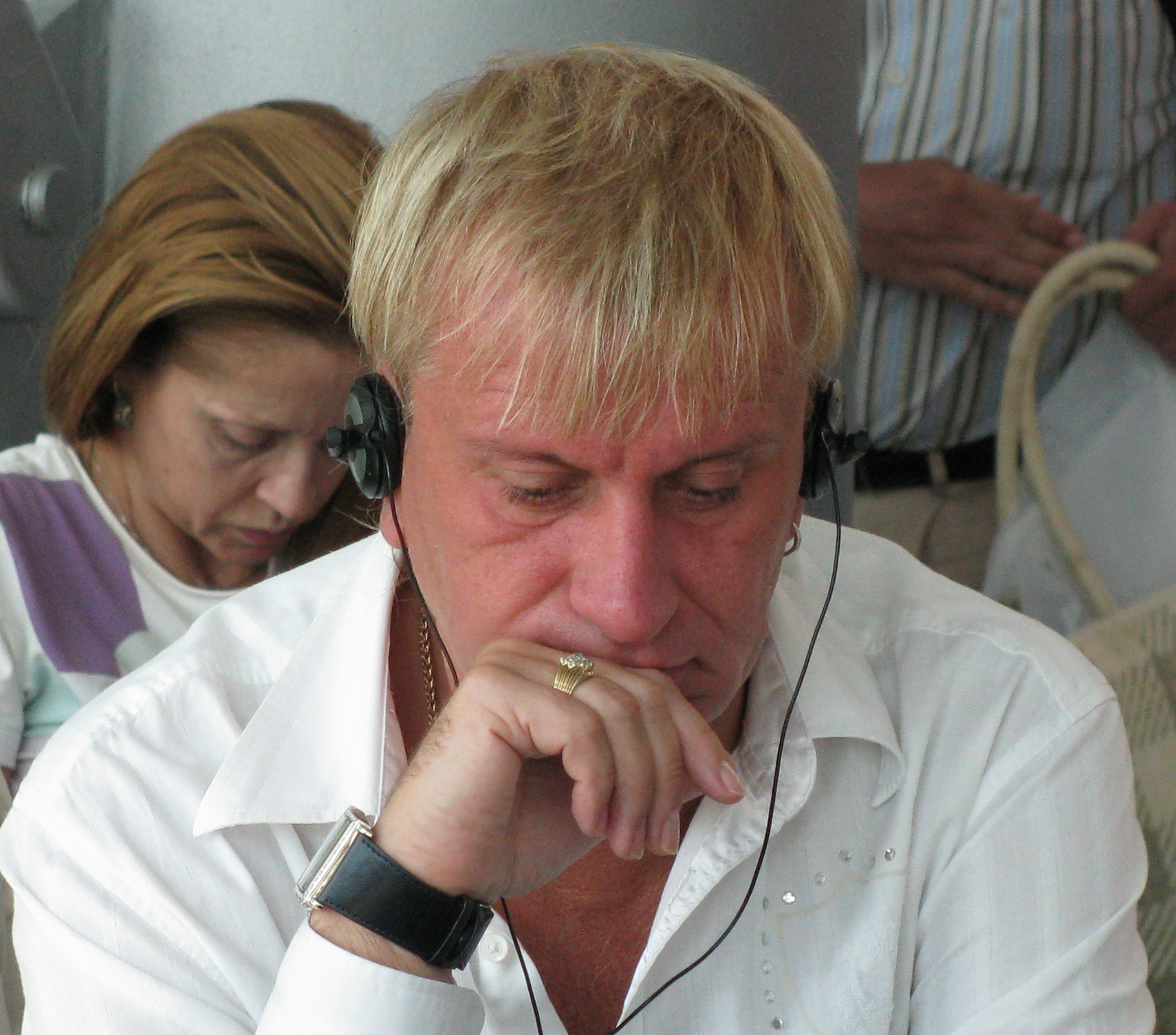
- Penkin in 2008

Background information
- Born: Sergey Mikhailovich Penkin; 10 February 1961 (age 65); Penza, Russian SFSR, Soviet Union
- Origin: Russia
- Genres: Pop, jazz, opera
- Occupations: Singer, musician, composer, teacher
- Years active: 1980s–present
- Awards: Honoured Artist of the Russian Federation (2023); Badge of Merit for the Development of the City of Penza (2013)

Sergey Mikhailovich Penkin (Russian: Сергей Михайлович Пенкин; born 10 February 1961) is a Soviet and Russian singer, musician, composer, and teacher. He is known for an eclectic repertoire that includes pop songs, romances, folk songs, opera arias, and Western standards. Since 2015, he has served as an associate professor in the department of pop and jazz art at the Moscow Pedagogical State University. In 2023, he was awarded the title Honoured Artist of the Russian Federation.

== Early life and education ==
Penkin was born on 10 February 1961 in Penza. As a child, he sang in a church choir and studied music at the local Palace of Pioneers. He later graduated from a children's music school in piano and flute and attended Secondary School No. 47 in Penza.

He studied choral conducting at the Penza Cultural and Educational School and later attended the Alexander Arkhangelsky Penza Music College. During this period, he performed with local vocal-instrumental ensembles and sang in a restaurant variety show in Penza.

From 1979 to 1981, Penkin served in the Soviet Army as an artillery sergeant. While in service, he performed with the ensemble Alye Shevrony at the Penza Artillery Engineering School, first as a percussionist and later as a vocalist.

== Career ==
In 1982, Penkin joined the group Ekipazh (Экипаж) of the Tyumen Regional Philharmonic together with guitarist Dmitry Chetvergov and toured the Tyumen region. In the mid-1980s he moved to Moscow, where he initially lived in a workers' dormitory and worked as a janitor in order to obtain residence registration and housing. He also became a vocalist with the Moscow Regional Philharmonic ensemble Poyut gitary (Поют гитары).

After multiple unsuccessful attempts, Penkin was admitted in 1986 to the Gnessin State Musical, reportedly on his eleventh try. He studied first under Natalya Andrianova and later under Vladislav Konnov.

While still a student, Penkin performed in a musical group created by Karen Kavaleryan. In 1987, he appeared with that group at a creative evening for composer Rodion Shchedrin; the performance was shown on Soviet Central Television. He also performed in Moscow restaurants and toured abroad with the variety ensemble of the Cosmos Hotel in Moscow.

Penkin's popularity in Moscow grew in the late 1980s and early 1990s. In 1990, he appeared on the television music program Programma A, performing the song "Nezhnosti polnyi vzglyad" (Нежности полный взгляд). Broader recognition followed in 1991, after he was invited to perform in the television project 50x50 at the Olympic Stadium in Moscow. His performance of "Feelings" became one of his signature songs.

In 1991, Penkin released his debut solo album, Holiday, and on 2 December that year, gave his first solo concert at the Oktyabr cinema and concert hall in Moscow. He graduated from the Gnessin institute in 1992 with a degree in academic vocal performance.

His repertoire has included Russian folk songs, romances, opera arias, Western pop standards, and works by contemporary Russian and foreign composers.

Since 2015, Penkin has taught at Moscow Pedagogical State University as an associate professor in the faculty of musical arts.

== Stage image ==
In addition to his voice, Penkin became known for an extravagant stage image and elaborate costumes decorated with sequins and rhinestones. Early in his career, he designed and made many of his costumes himself; later he worked with designers including Aleksandr Ratnikov, Sergey Burlakov, and Lyubov Sukhova.

== Personal life ==
Penkin comes from a large family and is the youngest of five children. His father, Mikhail Pavlovich Penkin (1926–1996), was a railway engine driver and a veteran of the Second World War, while his mother, Antonina Nikolayevna Penkina, worked on the home front during the war and later as a housewife and church cleaner.

Penkin was married from 2000 to 2002 to Elena Protsenko, a British journalist of Russian origin.

== Public image and views ==
Penkin has described himself as apolitical and has said that he has not taken part in election campaigns for political parties or individual politicians. At the same time, he has publicly described himself as a patriot and has said that he does not want to leave Russia.

In November 2015, the Security Service of Ukraine reportedly barred Penkin from entering the country, leading to the announced cancellation of concerts in Kyiv, Dnipropetrovsk, Kharkiv, and Odesa, although no reason was publicly given. Penkin's producer later said that no such concerts had actually been planned and attributed the situation to fraudsters, while also stating that Penkin had always maintained an apolitical position. In 2022, he performed concerts in Crimea.

== Religion and charity ==
Penkin is an Orthodox Christian. He has said that, while still at school, his visits to church nearly led to his expulsion from the Komsomol. Using his own funds, he financed the construction of two chapel churches in Penza: one dedicated to St. Sergius of Radonezh at the Novozapadnoye Cemetery, built in 2001–2003, and another dedicated to All Saints at the Eastern Cemetery, built in 2009–2010. He has also held charitable concerts in Penza and has donated artworks to the Penza Regional Art Gallery.

== Honours and awards ==
- Ovation Award for "Most Extravagant Stage Image" (1994)
- Vash Dosug magazine's Character of the Year award (2003)
- Silver Order Service to Art from the charity movement Dobrye lyudi mira (2007)
- Badge of Merit for the Development of the City of Penza (2013)
- Fashion People Awards, Fashion – Voice Man (2016)
- National Otkrytie award of Melon Rich magazine for contribution to discovering young talent (2016)
- Certificate of Honour from the Ministry of Education of the Russian Federation (2021)
- Honoured Artist of the Russian Federation (2023)
