= Sati Kazanova =

Russian singer (born 1982)

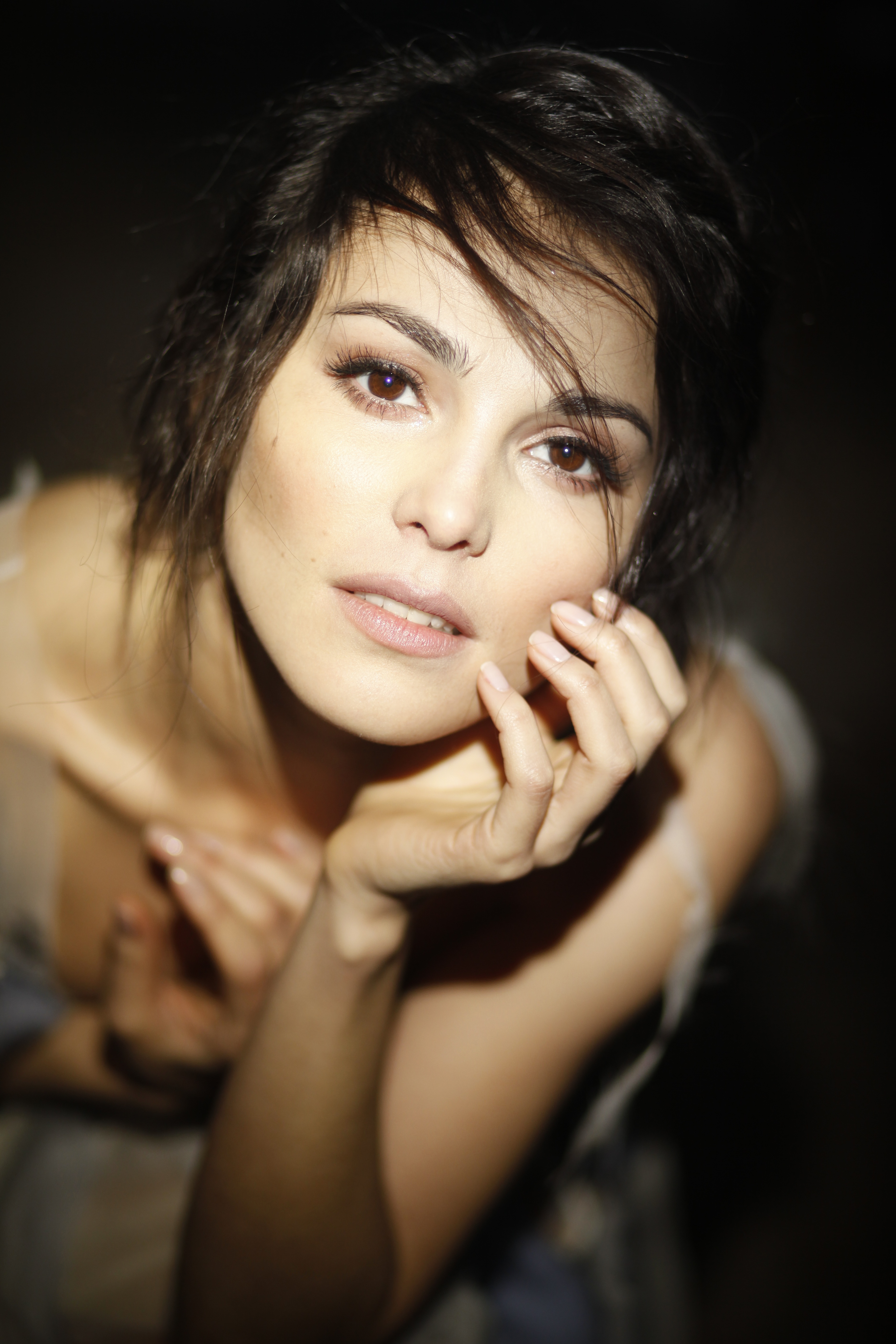

Background information
- Born: Sataney Setgalievna Kazanova; 2 October 1982 (age 44)
- Origin: Kabardino-Balkarian ASSR, Soviet Union
- Genres: Pop, Dance, Russian
- Occupation: Singer
- Instrument: voice
- Years active: 2002–present
- Spouse: Stefano Tiozzo (m. 2017)
- Website: satikazanova.ru (in rus)

Sataney Setgalievna Kazanova (Russian: Сатаней Сетгалиевна Казанова), better known as Sati Kazanova (Russian: Сати Казанова), (born 2 October 1982 in Kabardino-Balkarian ASSR) is a Russian singer. Until May 2010, she was one of the three vocalists of the Russian pop girl group Fabrika (Russian: Фабрика; Factory in English). In 2002, she took part in the first season of the Russian talent show Star Factory as a member of Fabrika, where they finished second.

She won the Astra (Russian: Астра) award for most stylish female singer in 2006.

On 5 October 2009 she was awarded the title of Honored Artist of the Republic of Adygea by the President of the republic, Aslan Tkhakushinov.

In 2011, she hosted the show The Phantom of the Opera, and in 2013 she became a participant in the show One to One!.

== Personal life ==
She studied at the Russian Academy of Music as well as the Russian Institute of Theatre Arts and she lives in Moscow.

Sati was born in Kabardino-Balkaria and her ethnicity is Adyge. She is a now Hindu and a vegetarian and practices yoga.

On 8 October 2017 Sati Kazanova married Italian doctor-turned-photographer Stefano Tiozzo in Vladikavkaz. They previously met at a wedding of common friends and her brother and later started a long-distance relationship, before deciding to marry in less than six months. In October 2024, the couple welcomed their first child together, a daughter.

The couple are followers of Vishwananda, a Hindu guru from the island of Mauritius.
