= Korni =

Russian pop-rock band

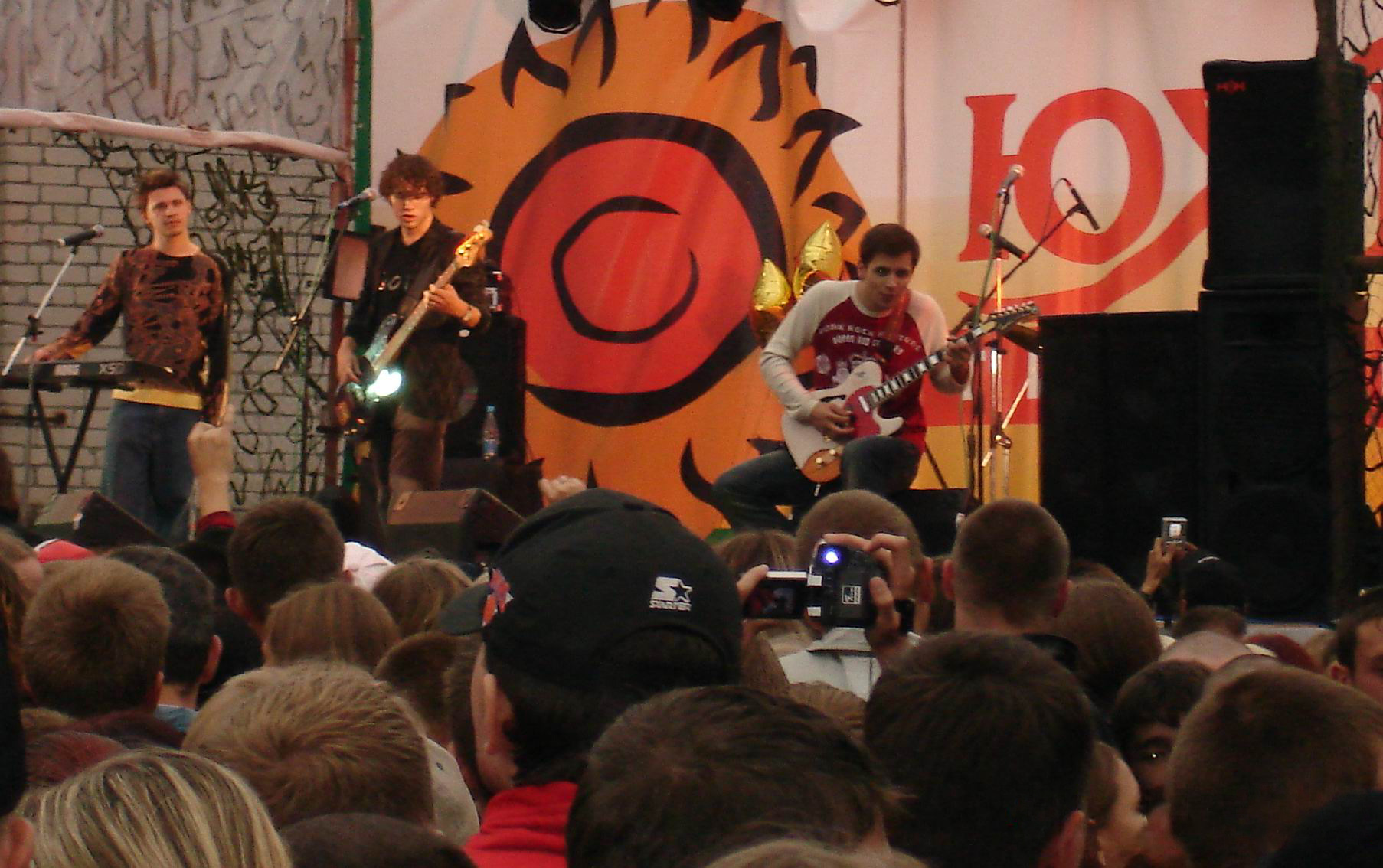

Background information
- Origin: Russia
- Genres: Pop rock, alternative rock, drum and bass, contemporary R&B
- Years active: 2002–2024
- Members: Alexandr Berdnikov; Alexey Kabanov; Dmitry Pakulichev
- Past members: Pavel Artemyev; Alexandr Astashenok

Korni (Russian: Корни, lit. 'Roots') is a Russian pop rock band. They rose to fame when they won best band on the show Star Factory-1. The current band members include: Dmitry Pakulichev (vocal), Alexandr Berdnikov (vocal), and Alexey Kabanov (keyboards).

== History ==
=== 2002–2003: Formation and debut album ===
The group was created during the project "Star Factory 1" and became the winner at the end of 2002.

=== 2005–2006 ===
On the eve of 2005 the band released a music video for the song "Happy New Year, people!

In April 2006 the band released a single "Want me to sing to you," the video for which was released in May the same year, filmed by the leading Ukrainian music video maker Viktor Priduvalov, who decided to connect the story clips of the band "Korni" and Victoria Daineko.

=== 2007–2011: Artemyev and Astashenok's departure and the group becoming a trio ===
In early 2007, the band released the song "Close Your Eyes" ("To You"), included on the soundtrack of the movie ″Waiting for a Miracle″. At the end of the summer, a music video was shot for the song "She's Lucky," directed again by Viktor Priduvalov.

In 2008, the band toured in the United States.

In April 2010, the band recorded the single "It Can't Be" with the band's new soloist. In June 2010, the group became a trio: Alexander Berdnikov, Alexei Kabanov and Dmitry Pakulichev, due to the departure of Pavel Artemyev and Alexander Astashonok at their own initiative.

== Discography ==
- Na veka (2003)
- Dnevniki (2005)

== OST's ==
- "S dnem rozhdeniya Vika" - used in the Russian version OST of Grand Theft Auto: Vice City
- "Naperegonki s vetrom" - used in the OST to television film "Kadetstvo"
- "Ty uznaesh ee" - used in the OST of comedy television film "Schastlivy vmeste".
- "Nasha Masha" - used in the OST of film "Nasha Masha i volshebniy oreh".
- "Zakrit' glaza" - used in the OST of film "V ozhidanii chuda".
