= Butyrsky =

Butyrsky (masculine), Butyrskaya (feminine), or Butyrskoye (neuter) may refer to:

- Butyrsky District, a district in North-Eastern Administrative Okrug of the federal city of Moscow, Russia
  - Butyrskaya (Moscow Metro), a station of the Moscow Metro serving that district
  - Butyrskaya Prison, named for Butyrskaya Zastava, the gate exiting central Moscow towards the district
  - Butyrskaya Ulitsa, a street in central Moscow
  - Butyrsky Val, a street in central Moscow
- Butyrsky (rural locality) (Butyrskaya, Butyrskoye), several rural localities in Russia
- Maria Butyrskaya, a Russian figure skater

With the addition of a diminutive suffix, Butyrka (singular) or Butyrki (plural) may refer to:

- Butyrki, Astrakhan Oblast
- Butyrka, the prison
- Butyrka (band), a Russian blatnaya pesnya band
