= Zvezdin =

Zvezdin (Russian: Звездин) is a Russian surname. Notable people with the surname include:

- Andrey Zvezdin (born 1986), Belarusian footballer
- Arkady Severny (1939–1980, born Arkady Dmitrievich Zvezdin), Russian singer
