= Znachit, pora =

2019 studio album by Lyubov Uspenskaya

Studio album by Lyubov Uspenskaya
- Released: April 12, 2019
- Genre: Pop, chanson
- Language: Russian
- Label: Cdland Contact

Lyubov Uspenskaya chronology
Eshchyo lyublyu (2016)	Znachit, pora (2019)

Professional ratings
Review scores
Source	Rating
InterMedia	6/10

Znachit, pora (Russian: Значит, пора; transl. Then it's time) is the eleventh studio album by Russian singer Lyubov Uspenskaya released on 12 April 2019 by Cdland Contact.

Almost the entire album consists of previously released songs and new versions of the singer's old hits. Half of the songs on the album are duets with artists such as Emin Agalarov, Leonid Agutin, Kira Dymov and Dominik Joker. Also the song "Panda E", recorded as a duet with CYGO, was included on the album.

== Track listing ==
No.	Title	Writer(s)	Length
1.	"Отпусти" (feat. Emin) ("Otpusti")	Alexandra Lyubimova, Kirill Arbatov	3:37
2.	"Небо" (feat. Leonid Agutin) ("Nebo")	Regina Lisits, Igor Azarov	3:59
3.	"Ты уйдёшь" ("Ty ujdyosh")	Kira Dymov, Igor Azarov	4:09
4.	"Где ты был" (feat. Dominik Joker) ("Gde ty byl")	Alexandr Breslavsky, Alex Kolchin	4:18
5.	"Ещё люблю" ("Eshchyo lyublyu")	Igor Kisil	3:40
6.	"Окончен путь" ("Okonchen put")	Alla Bayanova	3:22
7.	"Киев-Москва" (feat. Aleksandr Panayotov) ("Kiev-Moskva")	Leonid Agutin	3:47
8.	"Я милого узнаю по походке" ("Ya milogo uznayu po pokhodke")		3:36
9.	"Две судьбы" (feat. Vladimir Presnyakov) ("Dve sudby")	Regina Lisits, Igor Azarov	3:45
10.	"Сильнее, чем прежде" (feat. Soso Pavliashvili) ("Silnee chem prezhde")	Andrey Artemyev, Soso Pavliashvili	4:21
11.	"Цыганская" (feat. Tabor vozvrashchaetsya) ("Tsyganskaya")	Igor Grigoryev	5:17
12.	"Значит, пора" ("Znachit, pora")	Evgeniy Averyanov, Oleg Kashara	3:40
13.	"Пропадаю я" ("Propadayu ya")	Regina Lisits, Igor Azarov	3:51
14.	"Panda Е new" (feat. CYGO)	Leonid Vakalchuk	3:56
