= My Loved One =

Studio album by Lyubov Uspenskaya
- Released: 1985
- Genre: Pop
- Label: Frans Production
- Producer: Mikhail Shufutinsky; Vladimir Frans

Lyubov Uspenskaya chronology
| My Loved One (1985) | Express to Monte Carlo (1993) |

My Loved One is the debut studio album by Soviet-American singer Lyubov Uspenskaya, released in 1985 in The United States. In Russia the album was published in 1994.

The record became extremely popular among immigrants and made Lyubov Uspenskaya one of the most popular performers in Brighton Beach. It was certified Platinum by the RIAA.

== Track listing ==
All songs were sung in the Russian language.

| No. | Title | Lyrics | Music | Length |
|---|---|---|---|---|
| 1. | "It's Not Too Late" | Willi Tokarev | Willi Tokarev | 03:52 |
| 2. | "Find Your Soul" | Ilya Reznik | Raimonds Pauls | 04:34 |
| 3. | "My Garden Full Of Stars" | Tatiana Lebedinskaya | Mikhail Shufutinsky | 04:26 |
| 4. | "Russian Roulette" | Naum Olev | Maksim Dunayevsky | 05:05 |
| 5. | "Oh, Mama Forgive Me" | Mikhail Shufutinsky | Mikhail Shufutinsky | 03:30 |
| 6. | "Take Me Along With You" | Mikhail Tanich | Alexey Mazhurov | 03:50 |
| 7. | "Luba" | Mikhail Shufutinsky | Willi Tokarev | 03:25 |
| 8. | "My Loved One" | Willi Tokarev | Willi Tokarev | 03:20 |
| 9. | "Don’t Trust These Words" | Tatiana Lebedinskaya | Mikhail Shufutinsky | 03:31 |
| 10. | "It Couldn't Be" | Leonid Derbenyov | Vyacheslav Dobrynin | 05:35 |
| 11. | "Kalina" | Alexandr Shakhov | Valery Zubkov | 03:58 |
| 12. | "That's All It Us" | Andrey Dementyev | Arkady Horalov | 04:25 |

== Certifications ==
| Region | Certification | Certified units/sales |
|---|---|---|
| United States (RIAA) | Platinum | 1,000,000^{^} |
^{^} Shipments figures based on certification alone.
