= Irina Krug =

- Born: Irina Viktorovna Glazko; March 29, 1976 (age 49); Chelyabinsk, RSFSR, USSR
- Genres: Russian chanson, pop music
- Occupations: singer
- Years active: 2004-present
- Spouse: Mikail Krug

Irina Viktorovna Krug (single - Glazko, married - Vorobyova; born March 29, 1976, Chelyabinsk) is a Russian pop singer, performer of Russian chanson, multiple winner of the "Chanson of the Year" award, the second wife and widow of Mikhail Krug.

== Biography ==
Born on March 29, 1976, in Chelyabinsk to a family of an officer and a draftswoman. Since childhood, she attended a theater group at the local community center and dreamed of becoming an actress. She married early and gave birth to a daughter, Marina, in 1995. The couple later divorced.

In 1997–1999, she worked as a waitress in the Chelyabinsk restaurant "Malakhit". In 1999, she met the famous Russian chanson singer Mikhail Krug there. He immediately offered her to work for him as a costume designer: "For about a year, our relationship did not go beyond the limits. Everything was on a strict note. It was as if he was looking at me, checking me out. He was in no hurry to make a choice. At that point, he had already been living alone for eight years. And a year later, he simply took me into his house with the words: "That’s it, we’ll live together!" In 2001, Mikhail and Irina got married. On May 26, 2002, their son Alexander was born.

On the night of June 30 to July 1, 2002, Mikhail Krug was killed by unknown assailants in his own home. After Mikhail's death, family friend Vladimir Bocharov, an author and performer who had previously collaborated with Mikhail, invited Irina to perform several of his songs written in memory of Mikhail. This is how her first album, "The First Autumn of Separation," was released.

In 2005, she graduated with honors from Tver State University.

From 2006 to September 2020, she was married to Tver entrepreneur Sergei Belousov (born January 7, 1979).

On September 25, 2013, their son Andrei Sergeevich Belousov was born.

== Discography ==
=== Solo albums ===
1. 2004 — "First autumn of separation"
2. 2006 — "To you, my last love"
3. 2008 — "Handsome"
4. 2009 — "Island of love"
5. 2010 — "I will read in your eyes"
6. 2012 — "Loving is not scary"
7. 2013 — "Chanel"
8. 2015 — "Mature love"
9. 2017 — "I am waiting"
10. 2020 — "You are the heart and soul"
11. 2022 — "I bear your last name"

=== Duet albums ===
1. 2007 — "Hello, baby" (with Alexey Bryancev)
2. 2009 — "Bouquet of white roses" (with Viktor Korolev)
3. 2010 — "If it weren't for you" (with Alexey Bryancev)
4. 2011 — "Love story" (with Mikhail Krug)
5. 2011 — "City meetings" (with Viktor Korolev)
6. 2011 — "Roman" (with Viktor Korolev)
7. 2014 — "White flowers" (with Kira Dymov, Alexey Bryancev, Viktor Korolev)

=== Collections ===
1. 2008 — «The Best Songs (2CD)»
2. 2009 — «My Queen (The Best Songs)»
3. 2009 — «What Was»
4. 2010 — «All Hits (2CD)»
5. 2011 — «Loving Is Not Scary»
6. 2011 — «Romances»
7. 2011 — «Alley of Chanson. MK Collection»
8. 2011 — «GRAND Collection»
9. 2011 — «The Best (2CD)»
10. 2013 — «50 Best Songs (Greatest Hits)»
11. 2013 — «To You, My Last Love... (Best Love Songs)»
12. 2014 — «Love Story (Love Story)»
13. 2015 — «Duets»
14. 2015 — «Best Songs About Love (Deluxe Edition)»
15. 2015 — «Snow Queen» (vinyl)
16. 2016 — «Super Hits Collection»
17. 2017 — «Best Duets»
18. 2022 — «Russian Hits»

=== Singles ===
1. 2016 — "Intervals of Love"
2. 2016 — "And You Love Me" (feat. Edgar)
3. 2018 — "Seek Not Seek"
4. 2019 — "Your Home" (& Oleg Gazmanov)
5. 2019 — "Maybe Out of Foolishness"
6. 2020 — "Happy Equally"
7. 2021 — "Give Love"
8. 2021 — "Horoscopes on Fire"
9. 2021 — "Schastye Mily Uslo..." (& Vladimir Bocharov)
10. 2021 — "Moscow-Vladivostok" (& Islam Itlyashev)
11. 2021 — "Family"
12. 2021 — "Happy Holiday!"
13. 2022 — "I'll Choose Myself"
14. 2022 — "The Ice Will Melt Someday" (& Islam Itlyashev)
15. 2022 — "The Fire of Quotes I Forgot"
16. 2022 — "Like Sand Through Your Fingers"
17. 2022 — "How Many of Us Are So Beautiful" (& Tamara Kutidze)
18. 2023 — "Angel's Day"
19. 2023 — "Lonely Kalina"
20. 2023 — "All Roads Lead to You" (& Mikhail Zadorin)
21. 2023 — "Roses and Love"
22. 2023 — "We Are with You" (& Alexander Krug)
23. 2024 — "Lovers"
24. 2024 — "I Will Pray for My Happiness"
25. 2024 — "Formula of Happiness"
26. 2025 — "You Hug Me"
27. 2025 — "North Wind"
28. 2025 — "In White Agate"
29. 2025 — "Guys" (& Alexander Krug)

== Cinema ==
In the TV series in memory of Mikhail Krug, Legends of Krug (2013), the role of Irina Krug was played by actress Olga Smirnova (Filimonova).

== Awards ==
The Chanson of the Year Award in the following years:

- 2005 (for the song "Autumn Cafe")
- 2009 ("Sing, Guitar")
- 2010 ("Write to Me")
- 2011 ("House on the Mountain")
- 2012 ("To You, My Last Love")
- 2014 ("Loving Is Not Scary")
- 2015 ("I Will Read in Your Eyes")
- 2016 ("Chanel (Inventions in the Summer Garden)")
- 2017 ("Intervals of Love")
- 2018 ("I'm Waiting")
- 2019 ("Seek, Don't Seek")
- 2021 ("That's All" duet with Alexander Krug).
- 2023 ("Fire of Quotes I Forgot")
- 2023 ("All Roads Lead to You" (duet with Mikhail Zadorin) - special number

Real MUSICBOX Award-2017 winner in the "Urban Romance" nomination.

Yandex. Music Award (2019)

== TV shows ==
- Love stories (2003)
- People live! (11/19/2010)
- Let them talk (05/24/2016)
- The fate of a man (10/25/2017)
- Hello, Andrey! - "Evening in the company of Irina Krug" (10/24/2020)
- The fate of a man (02/11/12/2021)

== Literature ==
- Irina Krug. With you and without you / A. Vandenko // Collection. Caravan of stories. — November 2012 (No. 11).

== Links ==
- Official website
- Irina Krug: "The wedding was later"
