= Boka (singer) =

Soviet singer (1949–2020)

- Born: Boris Arkadevich Davidyan; April 28, 1949; Baku, Azerbaijan SSR, Soviet Union
- Died: July 20, 2020 (aged 71) Los Angeles, California, U.S.
- Genres: Russian chanson
- Occupations: Musician, songwriter
- Instrument: Vocals

Boris Arkadevich Davidyan (Armenian: Բորիս Արկադիի Դավիդյան; Russian: Борис Аркадьевич Давидян; April 28, 1949 – July 20, 2020), better known as Boka (Armenian: Բոկա; Russian: Бока), was an Armenian singer and songwriter, a well-known performer of "prison-style songs". He was born in Soviet Azerbaijan to an Armenian family.

== Biography ==
Boris Davidyan was born on April 28, 1949, to an Armenian family in Baku. His father Arkady Vartanovich was a war veteran who worked as a foreman at a factory. Boka lost his mother very early.

In 1972, he recorded his first music album in Yerevan. During the Soviet years, he became a very popular soloist with Armenian rabiz, Caucasian, and Russian chanson lovers. In his albums, most of the songs are his own creation, although he also sang compositions by Vladimir Vysotsky and Arkady Severny. He performed his songs with a special oriental flavor. Some sources call him a "classic of chanson".

In 1988, he visited the United States and recorded there his new and popular album, "The Thieves' Share" (Russian: Доля воровская). The main composition of this album became a hit and was subsequently performed by many of his fellow soloists.

Born and raised in Baku, he often spoke fondly of his formative years and career beginnings in a city known for its rich tapestry of cultures.

He stated "Regardless of our differences, we all treated each other like family, brothers & sister, mothers & fathers. Regardless of everything we were all united together." Reflecting on his experiences, he painted a picture of a Baku that transcended these divides, offering a space where art and music served as bridges between communities. His journey, emblematic of the Soviet Union's idealistic push for unity among its diverse peoples, showcases how cultural expression can foster a sense of belonging and peace even in the most complex environments.

Shortly before the collapse of the Soviet Union, he left Baku and moved to Yerevan, Armenia in December of 1989. At the beginning of 1996 he moved to Los Angeles, California.

He died on July 20, 2020, in Los Angeles after a long illness of the lungs. He had a son, two daughters and five grandchildren.

== Achievements and awards ==
- "Chanson of the Year 2006" for the song "Youth".
- "Chanson of the Year 2007" for the song "My Soul".

== Discography ==
- First Concert (Russian: Первый концерт) (1972)
- Second Concert (Russian: Второй концерт) (1973)
- Third Concert (Russian: Третий концерт) (1974)
- Fourth Concert in Baku (Russian: Четвёртый концерт в Баку) (1979)
- Fifth Concert "Back in Tbilisi" (Russian: Пятый концерт «Опять в Тбилиси») (1981)
- Sixth Concert (Russian: Шестой концерт) (1982)
- The Thieves' Share (Russian: Доля воровская) (1988)
- Nostalgia (Armenian: Կարոտ) (1993)
- Memory (Russian: Воспоминание) (1995)
- Hello from America (Russian: Привет из Америки) (1996)
- For All Friends (Russian: Для всех друзей) (1997)
- Mom, I'm your son... (Russian: Мам, я твой сын…) (2002)
- My Father (Russian: Мой отец) (2003)
- My Share (Russian: Моя доля) (2007)
- Where Are You, My Youth? (Russian: Где ты, юность моя?) (2008)
- My City (Russian: Мой город) (2008)
- The Price of Life (Russian: Цена жизни) (2011)
- To Live and Love (Russian: Жить и любить) (2016)
