= Gulko =

Gulko (Ukrainian: Гулько) is a gender-neutral Ukrainian surname. Notable people with the surname include:

- Boris Gulko (born 1947), Russian-American chess player
- Mikhail Gulko (born 1931), Soviet singer
