= CYGO =

CYGO may refer to:

- Gods Lake Narrows Airport, ICAO airport code CYGO, Manitoba, Canada
- CYGO (rapper), Belarusian rapper and songwriter
