= Yuri Istomin =

Yuri Istomin may refer to:

- Yuri Aleksandrovich Istomin, a singer-songwriter, monegasque entrepreneur, writer and investor.
- Yuriy Vasylyovych Istomin, Soviet Ukrainian footballer.
