= Grigory Leps =

Russian singer (born 1962)

Grigory Leps Григорий Лепс
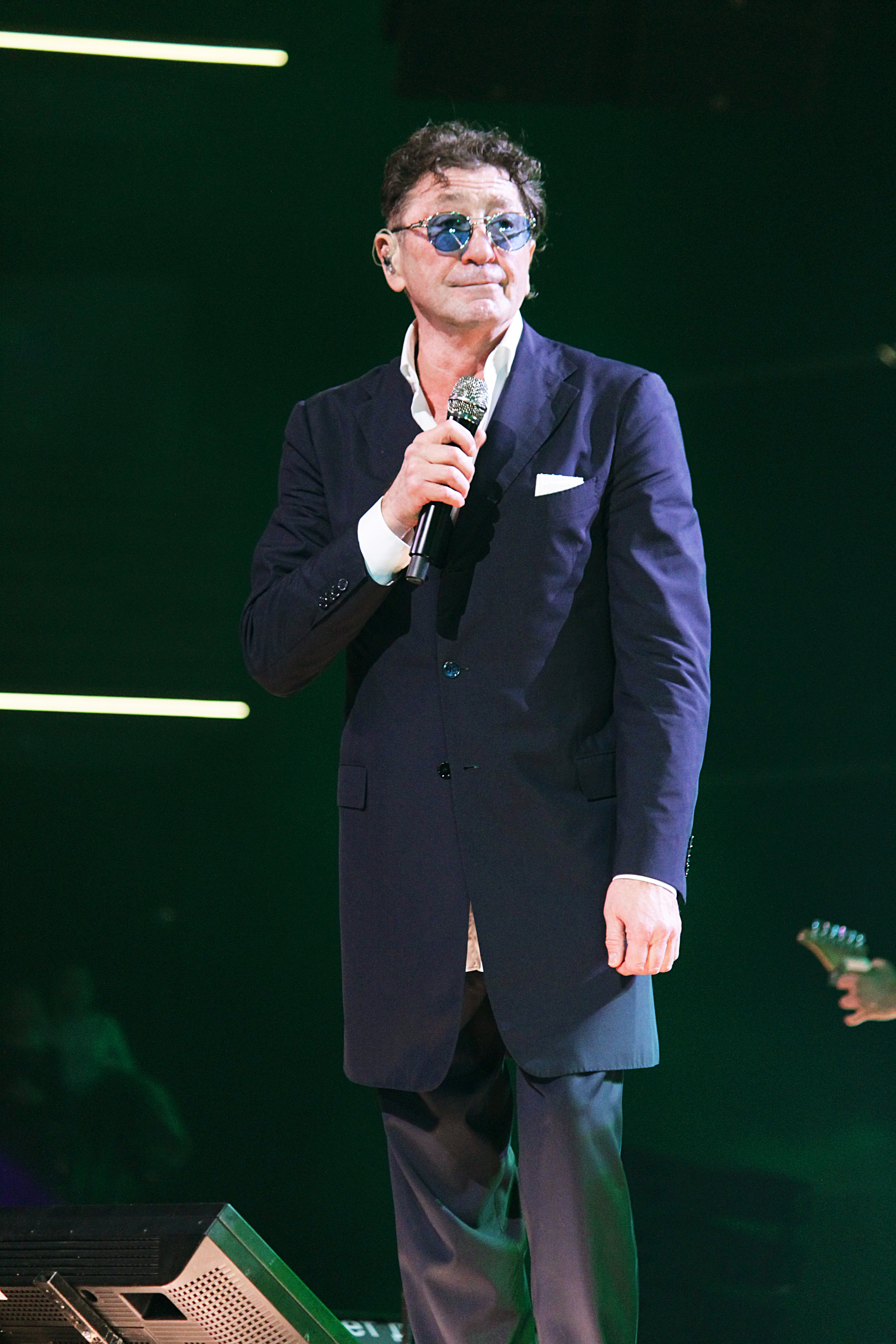
- Leps in 2025

Background information
- Also known as: Григорий Лепс; Grigory Leps
- Born: Григорий Викторович Лепсверидзе; Grigory Victorovich Lepsveridze; 16 July 1962 (age 63); Sochi, Russian SFSR, Soviet Union
- Origin: Georgian
- Genres: Soft rock, pop rock, Russian chanson
- Occupations: Singer-songwriter, musician
- Instruments: Singing, guitar, piano, drums
- Years active: 1987–present
- Label: Мистерия Рекордс
- Website: www.grigoryleps.ru

Grigory Viktorovich Lepsveridze (Russian: Григо́рий Ви́кторович Лепсверидзе, Georgian: გრიგორი ვიქტორის ძე ლეფსვერიძე; born 16 July 1962), known as Grigory Leps, is a Russian singer-songwriter of Georgian origin. His musical style gradually changed from Russian chanson in his early years to soft rock recently. He is known for his low, strong baritone voice. People's Artist of Russia (2022). Grigory Leps reported the highest income of all singers in Russia in 2013 with $15 million, 2014 with $12 million and 2015 with $12.2 million.

== Biography ==
Grigory Leps was born Grigory Lepsveridze in the city of Sochi, Russian SFSR, Soviet Union in an ethnically Georgian family. He finished music school in the class of percussion instrument. After the army he started to play and sing in a few rock bands, and worked as a singer in restaurants.

He suffered from alcoholism and drug addiction, and to get far from that life he went to Moscow. There he started singing in restaurants, until he received a record deal, and in 1995 he released the album May God Keep You (Khrani vas Bog). The song "Natali" became a hit, but he didn't know that because he was hospitalized for drugs and alcoholism. The doctors told him that one more drop of any of the drugs could kill him. In 1997, he released his second album, A Whole Life (Tselaya zhizn), which had a few hits including "Chizhik", "Gololed", "A whole life".

In 2000, he released the album Thank You People, with the hits "Shelest" and "Nu i chto". At that album was seen the change in Leps's style, with him completely leaving the Shanson and moving to rock music. In 2002, he released the album On Strings of Rain (Na strunakh dozhdya), with a hit "Rumka vodki na stole".

In 2004, he released a cover album of songs written by Vladimir Vysotsky in rock versions, Parus. The song "Parus" had a video clip and the album took top places at the selling charts. The second part of the album, Vtoroy was released in 2007 with its presentation concert being held in the Kremlin hall. In 2005, he released a compilation album called Izbranoye... 10 let.

In 2006, he released two albums, both reaching high success. Labirint, with the hits Labirint and Vyuga, and the album V tsentre zemli, with the hit Zamerzayet Solntse. The premier concert for the V tsentre zemli album took place in the Luzhniki Stadium. In 2007, he released two compilations. I'm Alive (Ya zhivoy, videoclips), and All My Life – a Road (Vsya moya zhizn – doroga, best songs). In 2009, he released the album, "Waterfall".

On 18 March 2022, Leps sang at Vladimir Putin's Moscow rally celebrating the annexation of Crimea by the Russian Federation from Ukraine and justifying the 2022 Russian invasion of Ukraine. The Presidential Administration of Russia put him on the list of singers who were recommended to be invited to state-sponsored events.

On 22 February 2023, Leps sang at Vladimir Putin's 2023 Moscow rally.

In June 2023, Leps' concert in the Almaty Region of Kazakhstan was canceled following pressure from the Kazakh public and activists over his support for the Russian invasion of Ukraine. In 2023, Kazakhstan and Uzbekistan canceled a music festival where pro-Kremlin Russian singers, including Leps, were scheduled to perform.

== Musical style ==
Leps is known for his wide vocal range. He has a low, growling voice. His style mixed rock music, pop music, and used to also have shanson in it.

== Connections with International Criminal Groups ==
In October 2013, the US Department of the Treasury blacklisted Grigory Leps, over links with an international criminal group. He was accused of being a money courier for the Brothers' Circle, which the Treasury describes as a Eurasian criminal organization chiefly based in countries of the former Soviet Union.

== Sanctions ==
In December 2022 the EU sanctioned Grigory Leps in relation to the 2022 Russian invasion of Ukraine.

== Awards ==
Awards
World Music Awards
| Preceded by 2008 Philip Kirkorov | Best-Selling Russian Artist; 2014; Grigory Leps | Succeeded by No ceremony held |

== Videos ==
1. 1995 — «Натали»
2. 1995 — «Храни Вас Бог»
3. 1997 — «Раздумья мои»
4. 1999 — «Первый день рожденья»
5. 2000 — «Крыса-Ревность»
6. 2001 — «Шелест»
7. 2002 — «Рюмка водки на столе»
8. 2002 — «Я верю, я дождусь»
9. 2004 — «Кровь, пот, слезы, любовь»
10. 2005 — «Ну и что»
11. 2005 — «Вьюга»
12. 2006 — «Она»
13. 2006 — «Лабиринт»
14. 2006 — «Замерзает солнце»
15. 2007 — «Я тебе не верю» duet with Irina Allegrova
16. 2007 — «Бессонница»
17. 2008 — «Она не твоя» duet with Stas Piekha
18. 2009 — «Уходи красиво» (cover-version of Bryn Christopher's "The Quest")
19. 2009 — «Что может человек»
20. 2010 — «Измены»
21. 2010 — «Обернитесь» duet with Valery Meladze
22. 2011 — «Вечерняя застольная» Trio with Alexander Rosenbaum and Joseph Kobzon
23. 2012 — «Реквием по любви» duet with Timati
24. 2012 — «Водопадом»
25. 2012 — «Лондон» duet with Timati
26. 2013 — «Зеркала» duet with Ani Lorak
27. 2014 — «Господи, дай мне сил»
28. 2014 — «Бай-бай» duet with Natalia Vlasova
29. 2015 — «Бабосы боссам» duet with Green Grey
30. 2017 — «Орлы или вороны» duet with Maxim Fadeev
31. 2020 — «СПАСИБО» duet with Timur Rodriguez
32. 2020 — «НА КАРАНТИН» duet with Timur Rodriguez
33. 2023 — «Родина-мать»
34. 2023 — «Ещё вчера» duet with Elena Sever
35. 2023 — «Русские маяки» trio with Yulia Chicherina & Vlad Malenko
36. 2025 — «Дайте надежду» duet with Lesha Svik
37. 2025 — «Пепел» duet with Egor Kreed
38. 2025 — «Она не скажет да» duet with SHAMAN
39. 2025 — «Рок-н-ролл в кармане»
40. 2026 — «Шутка» duet with AKMAL'

== Song of the year ==
| Year | Final | Title in English |
|---|---|---|
| 2007 | Я тебе не верю | I do not trust you |
| 2008 | Озеро надежды, Она не твоя | Hope Lake, She is not yours |
| 2009 | Я тебя не люблю | I do not love you |
| 2010 | Обернитесь, Уходи красиво | Turn around, Get out beautifully |
| 2012 | Лондон, Водопадом | London, Waterfall |
| 2013 | Зеркала, Я – счастливый | Mirrors, I'm happy |

== Discography ==
Albums

- 1991 — Гриша Сочинский (Grisha Sochinskiy)
- 1994 — Храни Вас Бог (Khrani Vas God)
- 1997 – Целая жизнь (Lifetime)
- 2000 – Спасибо, люди... (Thanks, people ...)
- 2002 – На струнах дождя... (On the strings of rain ...)
- 2004 – Парус (Sail)
- 2006 – Лабиринт (Maze/Labyrinth)
- 2006 – В центре Земли (In the center of the Earth)
- 2007 – Второй (Second)
- 2009 – Водопад (Waterfall)
- 2011 – Пенсне (Pince-nez)
- 2011 – Берега чистого братства (Bank of pure brotherhood) together with singer Alexander Rosenbaum
- 2012 – Полный вперед! (Full speed ahead!)
- 2014 – Гангстер No.1 (Gangster #1)
- 2017 – ТыЧегоТакойСерьезный (WhyAreYouSoSerious)
- 2021 – Подмена понятий (Podmena ponyaty)
- 2023 – Завтра (Tomorrow)
- 2025 – И смех и грех (Y smekh y grekh) released under project «наГЛец»

DVDs

- 2005 – Парус Live (Sail Live) Concert at the State Kremlin Palace in Moscow 13 March 2004
- 2007 – В центре Земли Live (In the center of the Earth Live) Concert in SC "Olympic" 16 November 2006
- 2007 – Я – живой! (I (am) alive) Collection of video clips
- 2010 – Что может человек (What can a man) Sat ornik videos
- 2010 – Водопад Live (Waterfall Live) Presentation album, "Waterfall", SC "Olympic" 20 November 2009, Full version concert
- 2011 – Научись летать Live (Learn to fly) Presentation album, "Pince-nez", Crocus City Hall, 7 mat, Full version concert

Collections

- 1995 – Натали (Natalie)
- 2005 – Избранное... 10 лет (Favorites... 10 years)
- 2007 – Вся жизнь моя – дорога... (All my life – the road ...)
- 2010 – Берега. Избранное (Shore. Favorites)
