= Blatnaya pesnya =

Genre of Russian popular music

Blatnaya pesnya (Russian: блатная песня, IPA: [blɐtˈnajə ˈpʲesʲnʲə], "criminals' song") or blatnyak (Russian: блатняк, IPA: [blɐtʲˈnʲak]) is a genre of Russian song characterized by depictions of criminal subculture and the urban underworld which are often romanticized and have criminally-perverted humor in nature.

== Terminology ==
In the post-Soviet era, blatnaya pesnya are marketed largely under the more generalized name "Russian chanson" (Russian: русский шансон, romanized: russkiy shanson). Coined in the 1990s, "Russian chanson" has become a marketing neologism akin to world music. Some collections identify these songs as ulichnaia pesnia or "street songs" (Russian: уличные песни, romanized: ulichnyye pesni), allowing for the inclusion of pieces that do not explicitly involve references to criminal behaviour. According to Robert A. Rothstein, this terminological fluidity: "reflects the fact that what makes a song blatnaia is more a question of style and tone than of literal content."

== Characteristics ==
Thematically, blatnaya pesnya focus on injustice and oppression under a political system, depictions of prison life, and celebrations of criminal life and thieves' code of honour. These themes are sometimes combined with sexual innuendo as well as elements of irony and humour. The use of fenya, an underworld slang, is characteristic of blatnaya pesnya lyrics. Also known as blatnoy language (Russian: блатной язык, romanized: blatnoy yazyk), fenya follows the grammatical structure of the Russian language, but borrows vocabulary from Ukrainian and Yiddish, as well as other languages, including French and Greek. In terms of structure, blatnaya pesnya generally lack choruses, instead consisting of long narratives composed strictly of verses.

Blatnaya pesnya have simple melodies, and root position tonic, dominant, and subdominant chords largely constitute the harmonic accompaniment. Consistent oscillation between tonic and dominant chords generally characterize the harmonic movement in these songs. Instrumentation varies, although contemporary songs make use of synthesizer sounds and supporting vocal arrangements. Blatnaya pesnya (under the umbrella term shanson) have also been associated with Klezmer, with an interplay between the genres beginning in nineteenth-century Odessa. "Klezmer-blatnoi hybrids" continue to be performed today, such as the Yiddish satire "Mein Yihus" ("my elder brother is a card shark, my mother is a prostitute"). Instrumental similarities link the genres, including the prevalence of up-tempo clarinets, horns, and accordion.

=== Odessa and Jewish identity ===
During the Soviet era, the multi-ethnic port city of Odessa served as the center for blatnaya pesnya, both literally and metaphorically. Odessa is a frequent subject in blatnaya pesnya, and the city took on a mythical role as the cradle of Jewish gangster culture. Blatnaya pesnya are steeped in the mythology of Old Odessa, a city of excess, and a paradise for thieves, where a prominent Russian-Jewish culture was associated with both wealth and sin. Although wrapped up in criminality and debauchery, Odessa was also "a land of wit and irony", in which Yiddish-inflected humour, brought over from the shtetls of Eastern Europe became the primary lens through which Old Odessa was depicted. Russian writer Isaac Babel popularized this image of "a city of swashbuckling Jewish swindlers and sinners", and the Jewish gangster came to epitomize Odessa in Soviet culture, in contradistinction to the victimized, tradition-oriented stereotype of the shtetl Jew. "Odessa-mama", a popular Yiddish and Russian collocation in literature and song, can be understood as a reference to the city's hospitality to criminals.

Major figures in the contemporary scene maintain a connection with Jewish culture. In May 2006, émigré singer-songwriter Willi Tokarev (11 November 1934 – 4 August 2019) drew a significant crowd to the Moscow Jewish Community Center, a Lubavitcher-run center financed by oligarchs. Tokarev's songs also explicitly address Jewish identity and immigration (e.g. "Why Are the Jews Leaving?"), and in 2006 he toured Russia and Israel to promote "Hello Israel," a Jewish-themed collection of songs. Mikhail Shufutinsky (born 13 April 1948), another international celebrity based in Los Angeles, sings songs based on Jewish themes and melodies, including "Song of a Jewish Tailor" (Russian: "Еврейский портной").

== History ==
=== Origins ===
The origins of this song genre are in nineteenth-century Russia, and its precedents include the songs of serfs and czarist political prisoners, as well as Bolshevik prison protest songs. Given the glorification of criminality in these songs, blatnaya pesnya are often compared to western gangster rap.

=== Soviet era ===
The genre took hold in the early years of the Soviet era, but blatnaya pesnya proliferated after Stalin's death. The relative relaxation of censorship, and loosening of social control during the Khrushchev and Brezhnev eras, gave rise to an illicit and underground second culture, of which blatnaya pesnya were an important part. These songs were sung in homes and clandestine concerts, and secretly recorded and distributed in order to circumvent the backlash of political authorities (a practice known as magnitizdat). The repression under Stalin, as well as the experiences of many Soviet citizens in the gulags, led to a distinct form of blatnaya pesnya that depicted the terrors of this period while simultaneously mocking them. Blatnaya pesnya functioned as an important cultural alternative to sanctioned socialist realism during the Soviet era. Russian writer and dissident Andrei Sinyavsky (8 October 1925 – 25 February 1997) argued that blatnaya pesnya represented the true music of the Soviet people, where criminalization and imprisonment served as the only bond among citizens.

=== Modern Russian context and commercialization ===
No longer a clandestine practice, Saint Petersburg now serves as the unofficial capital of the genre. Popular with older generations of Russians, these songs hold a vital position in the contemporary Russian music scene. Because of the subject matter and obscenity, blatnaya pesnya are denounced by politicians and public officials, but remain highly popular among citizens. Some contemporary radio stations in Russia are dedicated solely to this music, including Moscow's Radio Shanson (Russian: Радио шансон) channel.

=== American context ===
During the 1970s, as Soviet immigrants came to New York City, Brighton Beach became the foremost Western center for the production and distribution of blatnaya pesnya. These songs, along with other banned cultural products, made their way back to the USSR via sailors and diplomats, and several performers based in New York City became émigré stars in Russia, including Mikhail Shufutinsky, Willi Tokarev and Lyubov' Uspenskaya.

== Notable performers ==
Some notable performers of blatnaya pesnya include: Leonid Utyosov (21 March 1895 – 9 March 1982), Mikhail Krug (7 April 1962 – 30 June 2002), Vladimir Vysotsky (25 January 1938 – 25 July 1980), Arkady Severny (12 March 1939 – 12 April 1980), Alexander Rosenbaum (born 13 September 1951), Willi Tokarev (11 November 1934 – 4 August 2019), and Mikhail Shufutinsky (born 13 April 1948).

== Representative repertoire ==
Several popular blatnaya pesnya are recognized as Odessa folklore, and have been recorded by numerous artists including Leonid Utyosov and Arkady Severny. "Na Moldavanke muzyka igraet" ("Music is Playing in Moldavanka")—a reference to an historical part of Odessa—is also known as "Pesnia o Kol'ke-Shirmache" ("The Song About Kol'ka the Pickpocket") and dates from 1931 at the earliest. In this song, Kostia, the boss of the Odessa underworld, sends Mania to the labour camp at the White Sea–Baltic Canal in order to help Kol'ka escape. Upon her arrival, Mania discovers that the camp has rehabilitated Kol'ka. The song ends with the death of Kol'ka, on Kostia's orders, for his violation of the criminal code of honour. Another song called "S odesskogo kichmana" ("From the Odessa Jail") dates from the 1920s and tells the story of two prisoners' escape, during which one of the thieves is wounded. Variants of the song exist, and in some versions the wounded escapee asks his comrade to bury him, while in others he asks that his friend relay to his mother that he died in combat.

Willi Tokarev became famous in the Soviet Union during the 1980s for his songs depicting life as a Russian émigré in New York City. Two of his songs that express the difficulty of assimilating to American society and the struggle to abandon the criminal way of life include "New Yorkskiy Taksist" ("New York Taxi Driver") from his 1981 album V Shumnom Balagane (In a Noisy Saloon), and "Nad Gudzonom" ("Over the Hudson") from his 1983 album of the same name.

== See also ==
- Odesan Russian
- Rabiz
