= Mikhail Gulko =

Ukrainian-American singer (1931–2026)

Mikhail Gulko Михаил Гулько
- Gulko in 1994

Background information
- Born: July 23, 1931; Kharkov, Ukrainian SSR, Soviet Union
- Died: August 11, 2026 (aged 95) New York City, U.S.
- Genres: Russian chanson
- Occupation: Singer-songwriter

Mikhail Aleksandrovich Gulko (Russian: Михаил Алeксандpoвич Гулько; July 23, 1931 – August 11, 2026) was a Ukrainian-born American performer of Russian chanson.

In 1980, he moved to New York City to continue his musical career. He toured Russia regularly from 1993 onwards.

Gulko was the host and writer of the television and radio program Forgotten Melodies.

Gulko died on August 11, 2026, at the age of 95.
