= Lyubov Uspenskaya =

Russian singer and performer

Lyubov Uspenskaya Любовь Залмановна Успенская
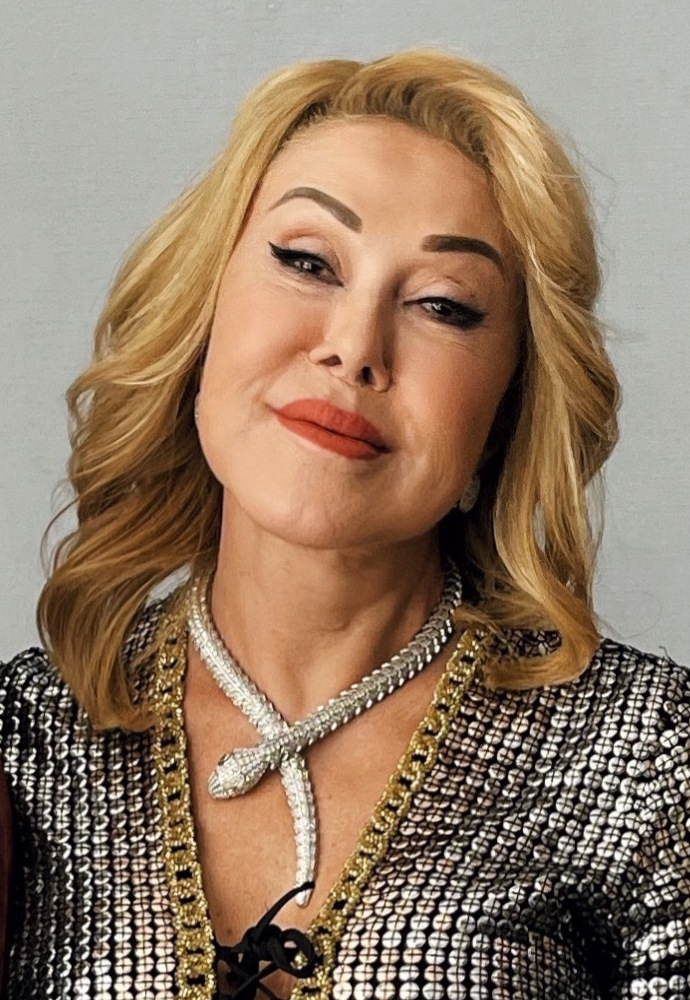

Background information
- Born: Lyubov Zalmanovna Sitsker; 24 February 1954 (age 71); Kyiv, Ukrainian SSR, USSR
- Genres: Pop, Russian pop, Soviet music, russian chanson
- Occupation: Singer
- Years active: 1979–present
- Website: yspenskaya.ru

Lyubov Zalmanovna Uspenskaya (Russian: Любо́вь За́лмановна Успе́нская; born Sitsker (Си́цкер); 24 February 1954) is a Soviet and Russian performer of Russian popular music, much of which is the so-called "urban romance" or Russian "chanson" (Russian: городской романс, gorodskoy romans) style. Multiple winner of the "Chanson of the Year" (Russian: Шансон Года) award.

== Biography ==
Uspenskaya was born in Kyiv (Ukrainian SSR) to Zalman Sitsker (1932–2002), the director of a household appliances factory in Kyiv, and Elena Chaika, a nurse from Ashgabat, who died during childbirth.

From an early age, the future star was surrounded by music. She was taught piano by her father and graduated from music school, where she studied to play the accordion. It was not her choice since it was her relatives who wanted, in memory of her grandfather, a professional musician and a director of the factory of folk instruments in Zhytomyr, her to master folk instruments. After the music school, she entered the Kyiv Glier School of Music and graduated in 1969.

The start of her career as a singer began in her hometown. One day, the family was celebrating a birthday at a restaurant, and her father asked her to sing. Uspenskaya went on a small stage and performed several songs accompanied by an orchestra. The musicians loved it so much that they offered her to work as a singer. Uspenskaya at that time was attending high school and since she was the accompanist of the orchestra, she was able to easily skip classes and fully immerse herself into the work. So, at the age of 16, Uspenskaya began to sing in restaurants and although she earned good money, she dreamed of being independent and living on her own.

At the age of 18, she met and married Viktor Shumilovich. In this marriage in 1973, she gave birth to two twin sons who died shortly after birth (one in childbirth, the other in a few days). The marriage didn't last long after that and the couple divorced.

In the restaurant where she was working at that time, she was noticed by musicians from Kislovodsk, who were looking for a good singer all over the country and, found everything they were looking for when they heard her sing. Subsequently, they offered her a job and invited to move out to Kislovodsk. Without thinking twice, Uspenskaya agreed and went to Kislovodsk to begin an independent life and build a career as a singer. There she quickly gained popularity and offers of other jobs. After working in Kislovodsk, the singer decided to go to Yerevan where she experienced her first break through. She worked with Levon Malkhasyan. People went to the restaurant where she sang just to listen to he. But the more popular she became, the more it was hinted that her repertoire and behavior on stage should be corrected. Lyuba's voice, known for its hoarseness, was considered criminal and did not meet the standards of the USSR.

In 1978, together with her second husband, Yuri Uspensky, she emigrated from the USSR. For about a year she lived in Italy, and was planning to move to Canada – to her parents and brothers who already lived there. However, refusing cash benefits, Uspenskaya decided to move to the United States, where she was offered a job by Leonard Lev of a singer in the city of New York City at the most popular Russian restaurant, "Sadko". During the first three days of Lyuba's performance, people who lived in Brighton Beach, the Russian-Jewish neighborhood in Brooklyn, were lining up to hear her sing.

In America, Uspenskaya divorced her second husband, when she met Vladimir Nizovsky, known as "Vladimir Franz", who moved to America from Germany. He became not only the singer's third husband, but also her producer who invested money in her first album. After "Sadko", Uspenskaya moved on to work at the restaurant called "Odessa" that belonged to Leonard Lev. In the late 1980s, she moved from New York City to Los Angeles. There Luba was offered a job at the restaurant "Arbat", formerly known as "Brown Derby". The restaurant had a 1930s design and style and was wildly popular among the celebrities of Los Angeles until it was bought by Russians and renamed.

In 1985, Uspenskaya recorded her first album, produced by Mikhail Shufutinsky. The album included several songs written by Willi Tokarev. The album was called "My Loved One", and released in US.

Having lived together for several years, Uspenskaya and Nizovsky decided to get a divorce. In 1988, Uspenskaya met businessman Alexander Plaksin. In her many interviews, she enthusiastically recalls how she was amazed by his gesture: the very next day after they met, he presented her with a black convertible. Alexander became her fourth spouse, and together they had a daughter, Tatyana Plaksina (born 27 December 1989).

In 1993 the compact disc "My Loved One" and "Do not forget" was released. Also in 1993, at the invitation of Leonid Derbenev's creative center "Steam", the singer came to Russia to shoot a video for the song "Cabriolet" (convertible). She was invited to tour Russia, which was a huge success.

Subsequently, she decided to move to Moscow, where Uspenskaya began to perform, record new songs and music videos, becoming more and more famous. In 1994, the singer released two collections of songs – "Hussar Roulette" and "Cabriolet", which received the second name for the English-speaking fans "The Best".

In 1996, the singer released an album called "Carousel" under the label Soyuz. In 1997, the album "I Am Lost" was released. The song "I'm Lost" brought the singer incredible popularity. Igor Azarov and Regina Lisits became the authors of the music and compositions presented on these discs. Later on, they also participated in the recording of another 5 albums. In addition, for a long time she worked with a songwriter Mikhail Tanic, whose songs are still in her repertoire ("Just a Cafe", "Batyushka", "Don't Repeat").

In the new millennium, the singer continues to release albums. In 2003, Uspenskaya presents the disc "Bitter Chocolate". Also since 2003, Uspenskaya regularly receives the "Chanson of the Year" music award. In the same year, the song "Sky" was awarded, and in 2004, "To My Only One". From the year 2006 she began to receive the Chanson of the Year award every year for over 10 years.

In 2007, Uspenskaya presented a new album with the title song "To My Only One ..." under the same name, which includes the tracks "Guitar", "Thin Ice", and "Forget". In 2010, the artist released the album "Fly, my girl", represented by the songs "My Autumn Love", "Violin". In the same year, she received 2 awards "Chanson of the Year", one for the song "First Love" in a duet with Vyacheslav Medyanik, and the second for the single "Fly, my girl, fly."

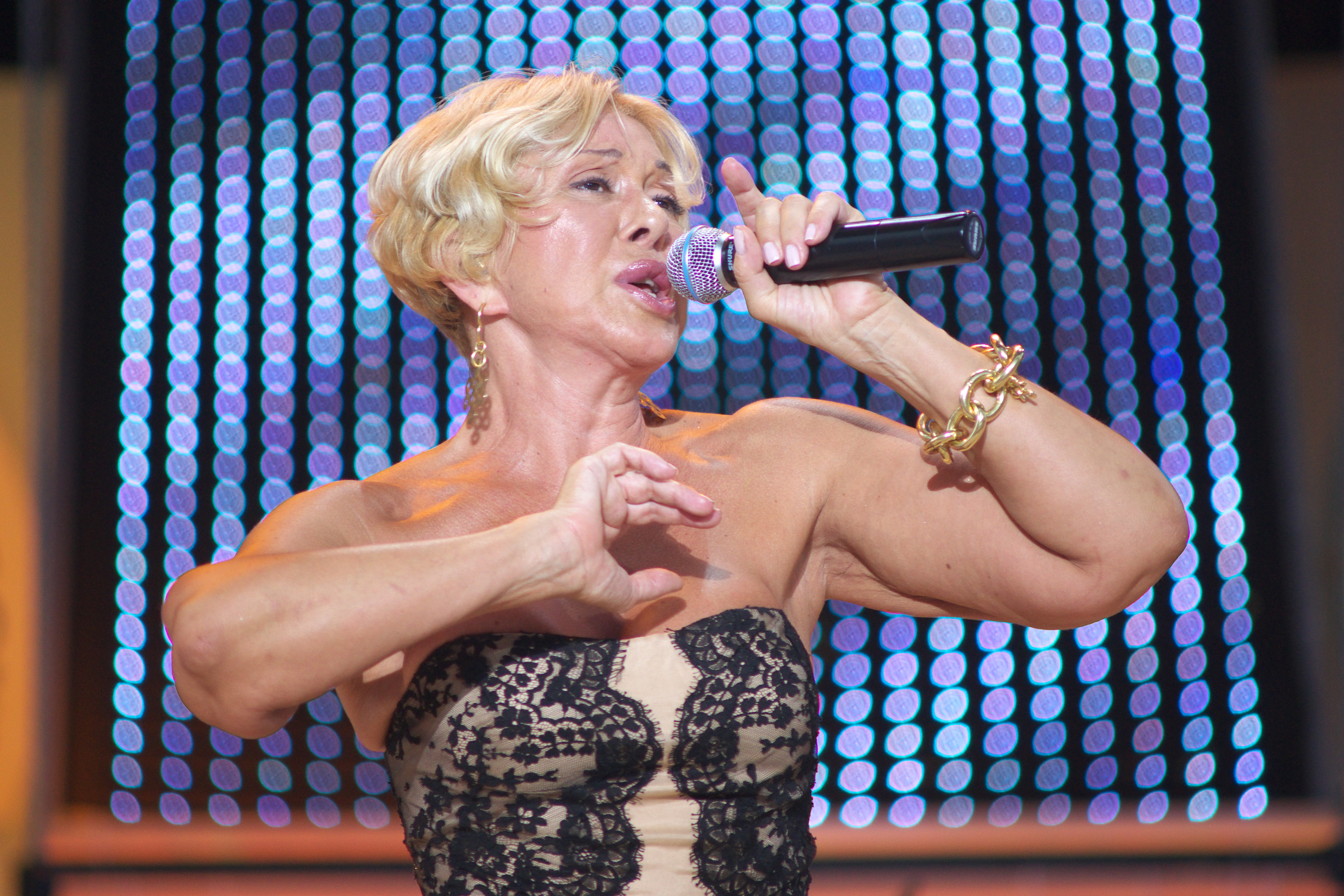
Uspenskaya performing in 2011

In 2012, fans heard a new song, "The Story of One Love," which was the title of her new album. In 2014, the celebrity recorded songs "I Love Him Too" in a duet with Irina Dubtsova and "Gypsy" with the band "Tabor Returns". A year later, a new record called "Tabletka" hot the charts, which Lyubov sang alongside singer Slava. And yet again she received numerous national awards for her performances of these musical compositions.

From 21 September 2014, to 14 August 2015, Uspenskaya was a member of the jury of the "Three Chords"- a musical program shown on Channel One. The singer is a frequent guest of famous music festivals as well. On the "New Wave" in 2015, Uspenskaya sang the song "Forgetting" together with Philip Kirkorov, and in 2016 she performed together with Dominic Joker a record called "Well, Where Have You Been". In 2017, she received the "Chanson of the Year" award for the song "I still love you" and for the duet with Leonid Agutin "Sky".

In 2019, the singer celebrated her 65th anniversary. A festive concert dedicated to the birthday of Uspenskaya was held in early March. The director of the show at the Crocus City Hall stage was Alexey Golubev, and the music producer was Edgar Hakobyan. Alla Dukhova's "Todes" ballet, Dominic Joker, Emin, Alexander Panayotov attended the evening as guests. Also for the first time on stage a joint duet of Uspenskaya and a rap performer CYGO was performed.

== Discography ==
=== Albums ===
- 1985 — My Loved One (Любимый) (LP, Frans Production, FP 3885-1, США).
- 1993 — Любимый (Jeff Records)
- 1993 — Не забывай Jeff Records; AVA Records, V 94007 (1994)
- 1993 — Экспресс в Монте-Карло Jeff Records SS 93031; AVA Records, V 94005 (1994)
- 1995 — Гусарская рулетка
- 1995 — Далеко, далеко (Студия «Союз»)
- 1995 — Концерт в „Метрополе" (Apex Records AXCD 3-0017)
- 1996 — Карусель (Союз/Master Sound, MS 085/SZCD 0594-96)
- 1997 — Пропадаю я (Союз SZCD 0827-97)
- 2002 — Экспресс в Монте-Карло
- 2003 — Горький шоколад
- 2007 — К единственному нежному... (Союз SZCD 4490-07)
- 2007 — Карета
- 2010 — Лети, моя девочка
- 2012 — История одной любви
- 2016 — Eshchyo lyublyu
- 2019 — Znachit, pora

=== Compilations ===
- 1994 — Гусарская рулетка (Jeff Records, большая часть песен взята с альбома «Любимый» (1985)).
- 1994 — Кабриолет (The Best) (F2F Music Productions, без номера, Канада).
- 1998 — Лучшие песни (Союз SZCD 0882-98)
- 1998 — Лучшие песни (Монолит МТ 265-1)
- 2000 — Золотая коллекция
- 2002 — Гусарская рулетка (Jeff Records, без номера; переиздание диска 1994 года с другим оформлением).
- 2003 — Любовное настроение (Никитин, TFH-CD08/03)
- 2005 — Настроение шансон
- 2006 — Ещё не поздно — Лучшие песни
- 2006 — Grand Collection
- 2009 — Союз Gold. Лучшие песни (Союз SZCD 6088-09; переиздание диска 1998 года).

== Singles ==
- Не верь чужим словам (В.Добрынин и Л.Дербенёв)
