= Oleg Gazmanov =

Soviet-Russian singer (born 1951)

Oleg Gazmanov Олег Газманов
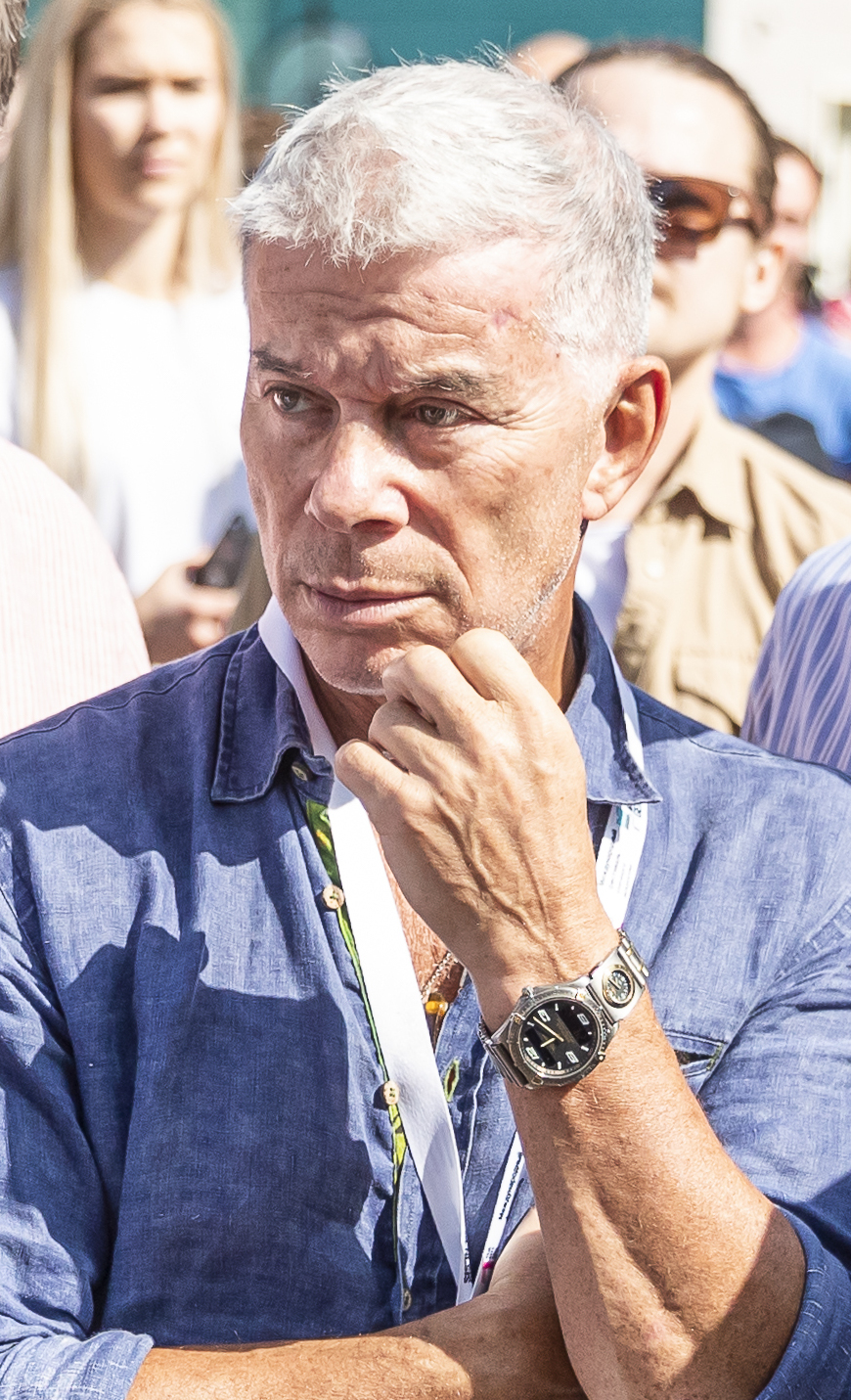
- Gazmanov in 2019

Background information
- Born: Oleg Mikhaylovich Gazmanov; 22 July 1951 (age 75); Gusev, Kaliningrad Oblast, Soviet Union
- Genres: pop, pop folk, Russian chanson, Soft rock
- Occupations: Singer, composer, actor
- Years active: 1987-present
- Website: www.gazmanov.ru

Oleg Mikhaylovich Gazmanov (Russian: Олег Михайлович Газманов; born 22 July 1951) is a Russian singer, composer and poet, specializing in patriotic and nationalist songs, as well as songs which cover more conventional pop themes. Gazmanov is the lead singer of the pop group Eskadron (Эскадрон, lit. 'Squadron'). His songs have been covered by others in the Russian chanson style, such as Mikhail Shufutinsky. He is also a Candidate for Master of Sport of the USSR in gymnastics and is well known for his acrobatics performed during live shows, especially at the beginning of his musical career in the early 1990s.

On 18 March 2022, Gazmanov sang at Vladimir Putin's Moscow rally celebrating the annexation of Crimea by the Russian Federation from Ukraine and justifying the 2022 Russian invasion of Ukraine. In April and May 2022, Gazmanov participated in a series of concerts in support of the invasion.

== "Sdelan v SSSR" ==
In the Soviet-nostalgic song "Sdelan v SSSR" (Сделан в СССР, lit. 'Made in the USSR'), which was originally released in 2005, Gazmanov glorified the past of the Soviet Union, presenting various personalities of the Tsarist and Soviet past as being parts of the nation. The New York Times claims he presented Lenin and Stalin as national heroes.

In December 2013, Gazmanov was criticised by the Lithuanian authorities for performing "Sdelan v SSSR" on the 20th anniversary of the Russian constitution and was threatened to be banned from his concert performance in Vilnius on 29 December.

In August 2015, the Security Service of Ukraine added Gazmanov to the list of cultural figures whose activities pose a threat to the national security of Ukraine.

With Gazmanov's participation, the song has since been abused as a nationalist rallying cry and was performed at the 2022 Moscow rally. Gazmanov later wrote other, nationalistic songs like "Vperyod Rossiya!" (Вперёд Россия!, lit. 'Forward Russia!'), which was answered by Nogu Svelo! with the song "Nazad, Rossiya!" (Назад, Россия!, lit. 'Go back, Russia!') to a popular football tune.

== Personal life ==
He said that his father was Belarusian and his mother was Jewish, but he himself feels Russian. He has married twice and has three children.

== Sanctions ==
In July 2014, Gazmanov was banned from entering Latvia by foreign minister Edgars Rinkēvičs for "through words and actions having contributed to the undermining of Ukraine's sovereignty and territorial integrity". Commenting on the Latvian Foreign Minister's decision, Gazmanov said, "This gesture right before the opening of the New Wave festival in Jūrmala endangers the entire cultural and economic relations between our countries."

In August 2015, the Security Service of Ukraine placed Gazmanov on the list of artists whose activity posed a threat to Ukraine's national security.

In August 2016, the Lithuanian government also denied his entry to Lithuania at Vilnius Airport.

== Popular songs ==
- "Ofitsery"
- "Moskva"
- "Nikto krome nas"
- "Moi yasnye dni"
- "Eskadron"
- "Esaul"
- "A Ya Devushek Lyublyu"
- "Dozhdis'"
- "Dolya"
- "Na Zare"
- "Svezhyi Veter"
- "Edinstvennaya" (by Philipp Kirkorov)
- "Tuman"
- "Zagulyal"
- "Greshnyi put" (by Valery Leontiev)
- "Belyi sneg" (by Valery Leontiev)
- "Moryachka"
- "Baltiyskiy Bereg"
- "Zabiray" (duet with Sofia Rotaru)
- "Proshay"
- "Vpered Rossiya"
- "Sdelan v SSSR"

== Awards ==
- Candidate for Master of Sport of the USSR
- Meritorious Artist of Russia (1995)
- People's Artist of Russia (2002)
- Order of Honour (2006)

Awards
World Music Awards
Preceded by 1991 Valery Leontiev	Best-Selling Russian Artist; 1992; Oleg Gazmanov	Succeeded by 1993 Laima Vaikule
