= Lesopoval =

Russian band formed in 1990

- The founding members of the band

Background information
- Origin: Russia
- Genres: Russian chanson
- Years active: 1990 - present
- Members: Sergei Kuprik; Stanislav Volkov; Colovyov Apimovich; Veniamin Smirnov; Aleksandr Loshakov; Konstantin Rodionov; Vladimir Blinnikov; Vyacheslav Velichkovskij
- Past members: Mikhail Tanich (co-founder and writer); Sergey Korzhukov (co-founder)
- Website: http://www.lesopoval.ru

Lesopoval (Russian: Лесопова́л pronounced [lʲɪsəpɐˈvaɫ], translated as "tree felling" or "logging camp", a symbol of Siberian labor camps and also of the forced labor within the camps) is a Russian band formed in 1990 by Mikhail Tanich and Sergey Korzhukov. Their music is in the style of Russian chanson, which is music from the perspective of the criminal underworld. The hero of many of their songs is often a criminal or ex-convict, and their songs contain many references to the way such "marginalized" persons live. The songs in many way romanticize the life of criminals, many of them taking place in and concerning labor camps and prison.

Mikhail Tanich wrote the lyrics to every song the group performed until his death on April 17, 2008. In writing the lyrics to the songs Lesopoval performed, Mikhail Tanich drew on the six years he spent in a Soviet labor camp, during which time he came to empathize with criminals from all walks of life. In total, the group released at least 19 albums, including one after Mikhail Tanich's death. Until his death in 1994, Sergey Korzhukov wrote the musical melodies and performed most of the songs; after his death, other artists wrote and performed the melodies. Musically, most songs feature a guitar, drums, accordions, and are often performed with strong vocals.

== History ==
Mikhail Tanich, the co-founder and lead songwriter of Lesopoval, was born on September 15, 1923, in Taganrog, Russia. After being accused of "anti-Soviet agitation" due to his praise of the German radio Telefunken while at the Rostov Civil Engineering Institute, he served six years in the Soviet labor camps from 1947 to 1953 in the Siberian city of Solikamsk. This was the same labor camp where his father served and was executed. When Joseph Stalin died, Tanich was granted amnesty, and he would leave to become a Russian poet.

He wrote many poems that would, after he met Sergey Korzhukov in 1990, become the music of Lesopoval. The two met while Tanich was searching for a soloist to sing his songs; Tanich's wife had recommended Korzhukov. Sergey Korzhukov turned the poems into music by incorporating a melody, musical notes and a guitar accompaniment. He also sang the early songs of Lesopoval. The reason they named their musical group "Lesopoval" was that this was the term that people commonly used to refer to the Soviet Siberian labor camps, and the musical group was created from Tanich's experience in these Siberian camps.

Together, Mikhail Tanich and Sergey Korzhukov wrote the early songs of Lesopoval. In 1994, Sergey Korzhukov died at the age of 35 after falling from the balcony of his house, but he was still listed as a co-author of all the songs through the 1996 album "New Lineup" (Новый состав.)

After the death of Sergey Korzhukov, many other writers and singers helped write the music for the songs, including Aleksandr Fedorkov. In 2008, Tanich died in the hospital from kidney disease. Until his death, Mikhail Tanich continued to write the lyrics for all the Lesopoval songs, including the latest album - "Our life," (Наша Жизнь) which was produced and released after his death. In his honor, the group performed in the Kremlin to memorialize his death.

== Musical style ==
The music of Lesopoval places great importance on lyrical content, which tends to focus on freedom, labor camps, criminal life, and occasionally other topics such as peace and love. Mikhail Tanich has stated that his six years in the Russian labor camps gave him an inside perspective of all kinds of criminal life, and that his goal was to find the good in all sorts of criminals. Mikhail Tanich was a political prisoner, but he came to sympathize with many of the other prisoners who were serving in the camps, some who were falsely accused and some who were there for petty crimes. He has stated that Chanson music "blossomed wildly in Soviet times when the entire country was in camps, when these zones, barbed wire, guard towers with guards and machine guns, were everywhere," and he has said that he feels that everyone in Russia is in some way connected to the camps and to criminal life.

In his songs, Mikhail Tanich often touches on universal themes of Soviet life, focusing on criminal elements (the camps, the buses that took people to camp, the life of ex-convicts, etc.) Some of his songs also deal with the political themes of the Soviet era, often with a humorous take. For example, the song "Tax" focuses on the tax on childlessness imposed during the Soviet Union, which was a 6% tax on every adult who did not have a child. The hero of the song laments that he is forced to pay this tax while doing time in jail, yet the prison guards refuse to provide him any woman with which to reproduce.

The songs often include criminal slang, jargon and vulgarities, which the group says is necessary in order to accurately represent criminal life in Russia. However, official Governmental sources have denounced bands that sing in the style of Russian Chanson, with Vladimir Ustinov, the former prosecutor general, calling it "propaganda of the criminal subculture."

Musically, the group builds upon the style of Russian bard music, which features strong vocals with a guitar accompaniment. The music mixes these more traditional instruments with an accordion, synthesizer, and drums.

== Reception ==
Due to the propensity of Russian piracy, it is difficult to measure how many Lesopoval records have been sold. Furthermore, the genre is typically relegated to late-night broadcasts due to governmental pressure, and is not typically played on the radio, where Russian pop is more popular. However, Lesopoval regularly performs concerts, and is one of the most popular current Chanson bands in Russia.

Critically, the band has received positive reviews from critics. The Russian website Pravda positively reviewed their recent concerts, but stated that the group's first hit -- "I will buy you a house" (sung by Sergey Korzhukov) -- remains their most popular and well-sung song.

== Discography ==
- Ya kuplyu tebe dom / I will buy you a house (1993)
- Kogda ya pridu / When I come (1993)
- Vorovskoj zakon / Law of thieves (1993)
- Poslednij kontsert s Sergeem Korzhukovym / The final concert with Sergey Korzhukov (1994)
- Amnistiya / Amnesty (1995)
- Novyj sostav / New composition (1996)
- Koroleva Margo / Queen Margo (1996)
- 101-j kilometr / 101st kilometer (1998)
- Legendy Russkogo Shansona tom / Legends of Russian Chanson Volume (2000)
- Kormilets / The Feeder (2000)
- Lichnoe svidanie / Conjugal visit (2001)
- Ya - ottuda / I am from there (2002)
- Bazara net / No rumble (2003)
- Svobodna, blin! / Freedom, darn it! (2005)
- Vintorez / The Rifle (2006)
- Ulybnis, Rossiya! / Smile, Russia! (2006)
- Mama - ulitsa / Mother Street (2007)
- Nasha Zhizn / Our Life (2008)
