= Aleksandr Novikov (singer) =

Soviet-Russian singer (born 1953)

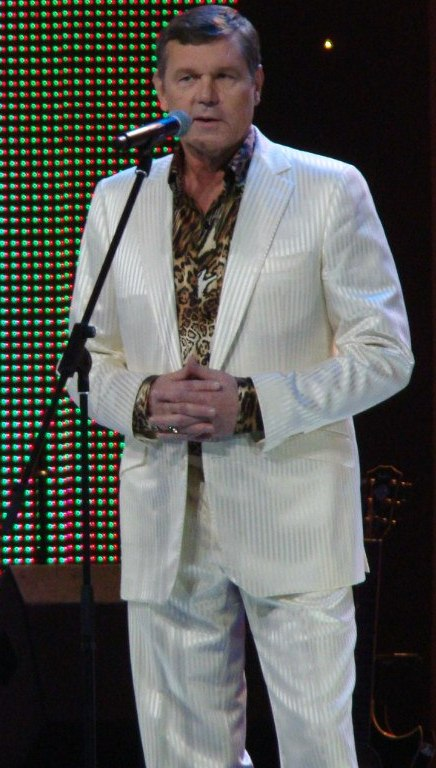

Background information
- Birth name: Aleksandr Vasilyevich Novikov
- Born: October 31, 1953 (age 71)
- Genres: bard, russian chanson, rock, blues
- Occupation(s): singer, poet, composer
- Years active: 1980–present

Aleksandr Vasilyevich Novikov (Russian: Александр Васильевич Новиков; born October 31, 1953) is a Soviet and Russian author and performer of songs in the genre of Russian chanson, artistic director of the Yekaterinburg Variety Theatre.

During the creative activity of Aleksandr Novikov wrote over three hundred songs.

His discography currently consists of 20 numbered albums, 10 albums with recordings of concerts, 8 DVDs. Since 2002 published book Kolokolnya (a collection of poems and songs).

Novikov is the winner of the national award Ovation in the nomination Urban Romance (1995), repeated winner of the Chanson of the Year.
