= Butyrka (band) =

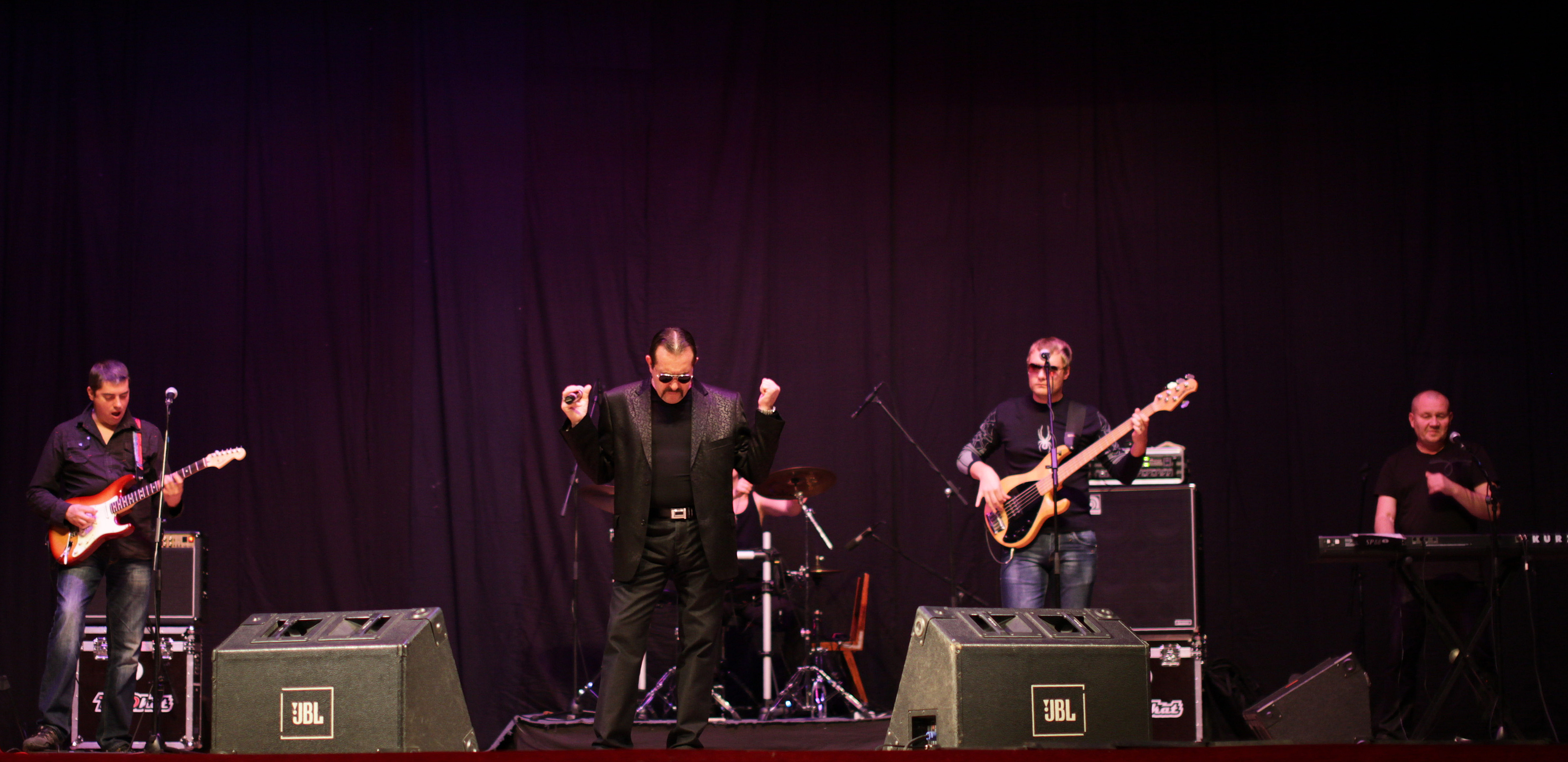

Background information
- Origin: Moscow, Russia.
- Genres: Russian chanson
- Years active: 2001-present

Butyrka (Russian: Бутырка) is a Russian music group, working in the genre Blatnaya pesnya.

It is considered one of the most popular bands in the style of Russian chanson. The band leads an active concert life both in Russia and abroad.

== History ==
Established in Voronezh in 2001, produced many artists and projects in this genre Alexander Abramov. Known for songs like "Smell of Spring", "Girlfriend of the center", "The smell of wax", "Sharik", "Do not touch the autumn", "Icon", "To serve for the sins of others", "For the Rostov Bratva," "Snow melts","Certificate" and others.

At the end of December 2013, Vladimir Zhdamirov, the vocalist, left the band and started his solo creative work. All of the band's songs are now performed with the new vocalist Michael Borisov, who was recently released from prison. In December 2014 the former vocalist Butyrka Vladimir Zhdamirov released his first solo album "Behind the fence Spring".

In 2015, after recovering Mikhail Borisov left the band. Now the group is the main soloist Andrei Bykov.

== Discography ==
- '2002' — The first album
- '2002' — The second album
- '2004' — Vestochka
- '2005' — Icon
- '2007' — The fifth album
- '2009' — The sixth album
- '2009' — On the other side of the fence
- '2010' — Hooligan
- '2010' — Freedom Street
- '2014' — I'll be back home
- '2015' — Svidanka
- '2018' — The 12th album
- '2024' — I'll serve time for other people's affairs (Best songs 2024)
