= Mikhail Krug =

Russian singer (1962–2002)

Mike Krug Михаил Круг
- Born: Michael Vladimirovich Vorobyov; April 7, 1962; Kalinin, Russian SFSR, Soviet Union
- Died: July 1, 2002 (aged 40) Tver, Russia
- Genre: Russian chanson
- Occupation: Singer
- Instruments: Vocals, guitar
- Years active: 1987–2002
- Website: http://www.mkrug.ru/

Mikhail Vladimirovich Vorobyov (Russian: Михаил Владимирович Воробьёв; April 7, 1962 – July 1, 2002), known professionally as Mikhail Krug (lit. 'Michael the Circle'; Russian: Михаил Круг), was a Russian singer. Krug was one of the most popular singers of the style of music known as blatnaya pesnya or Russian chanson, a genre of music that has been popular in Russia since the beginning of the twentieth century.

== Biography ==
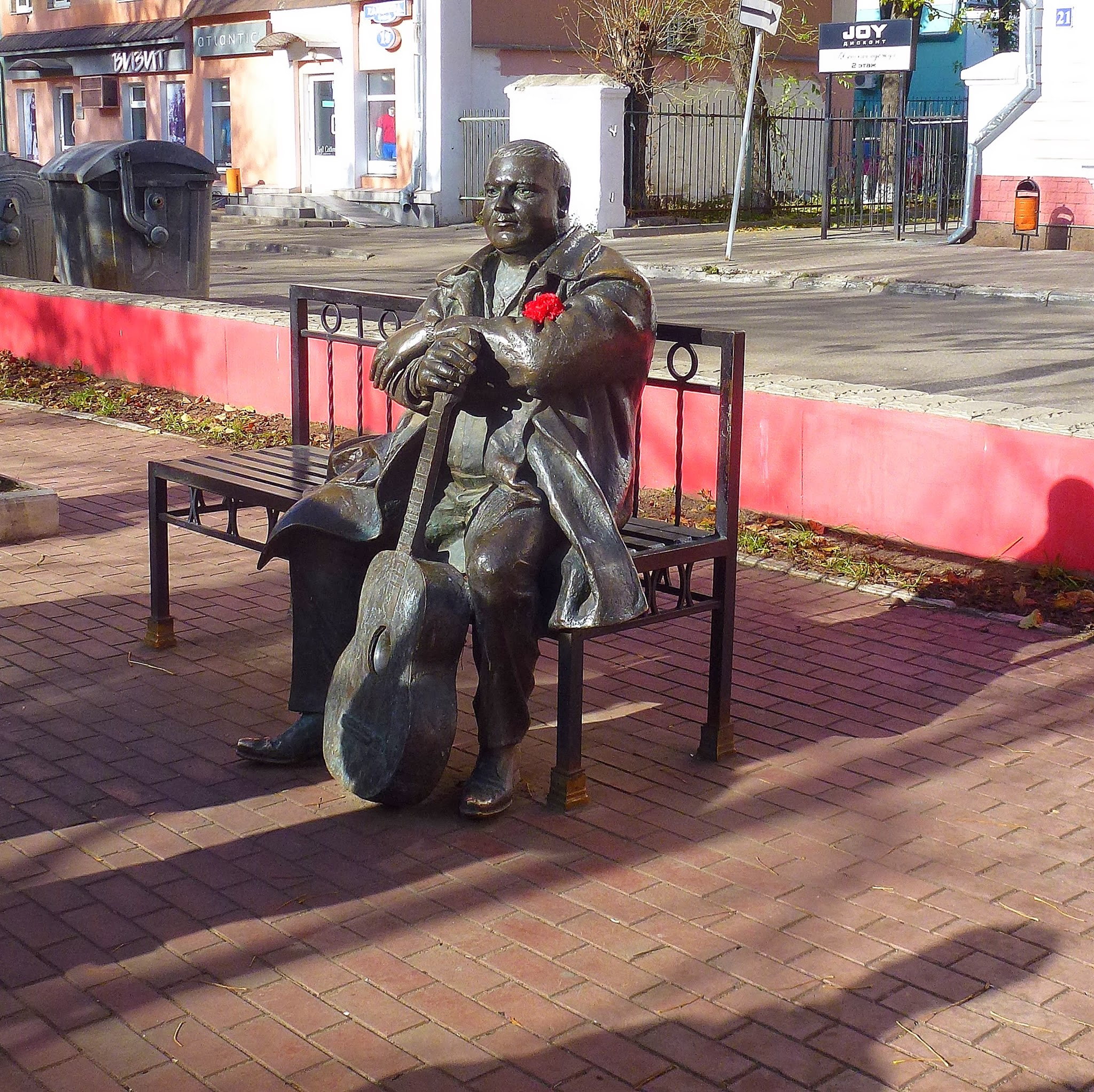
Monument to Mikhail Krug in Tver

Mikhail Vorobyov was born in the Proletarsky district, also known as Morozovskiy Gorodok, in the city of Kalinin, which would later be known as Tver. He was born to Vladimir Mikhailovich Vorobyov and Zoya Petrovna Vorobyova. He was inspired by the music of Vladimir Vysotsky since his childhood. His stage name is derived from the Russian word "Krug", which means circle.

After completing service in the army, Krug entered a song contest in 1987, in which he would take first place with the song "About Afghanistan". Afterwards, he decided to seriously pursue songwriting as a career. Krug then recorded his first three albums, Tverskiye Streets (1989), Katya (1990), and an untitled third album. These albums were not released officially, but were distributed through piracy, to which Krug would give his blessing. Most of the songs on these three albums would be rerecorded for his later albums. His first official album, Zhigan-Limon (1994), featured one of his biggest hits, "Kolshchik". Krug often associated with criminals, who inspired his music. Many of Krug's songs invoke the secret code of Russian prisons and the symbolism of prisoner tattoos. Krug used a 1924 NKVD dictionary of underworld slang to help write his songs. He also wrote love songs and songs about Tver.

During his lifetime, Krug was a supporter of the Liberal Democratic Party of Russia.

In the late evening of June 30, 2002, Mikhail Krug was fatally shot in his house in Tver by several unknown intruders. He died in the hospital a few hours later. A 2012 DNA test revealed that Krug's killer was Dmitry Veselov, who was also murdered in March 2003 in Tver.

In 2001, he married Irina Glazko, whom he had met two years prior in Chelyabinsk while on tour. On 26 May 2002, his son Aleksandr was born. In 2004, his wife started her own music career as Irina Krug. His son also made his debut in music at the age of 18 as Aleksandr Krug.
