= Alexander Rosenbaum =

Russian bard (born 1951)

Alexander Rosenbaum Александр Розенбаум
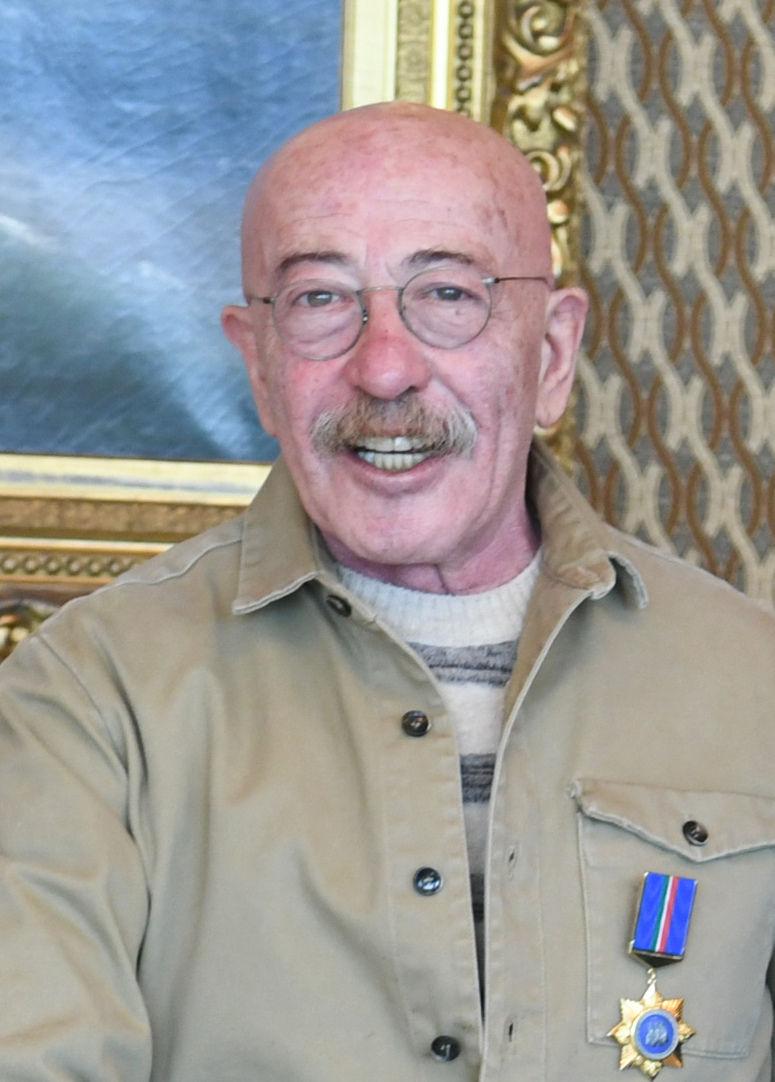
- Rosenbaum in 2022

Background information
- Also known as: Ayarov
- Born: Aleksandr Rozenbaum; September 13, 1951 (age 74); Leningrad, Soviet Union
- Genres: russian chanson, bard, rock
- Occupation(s): Musician, songwriter, doctor, actor
- Years active: 1968–present
- Website: rozenbaum.ru

Alexander Yakovlevich Rosenbaum PAR (Russian: Александр Яковлевич Розенбаум, Aleksandr Jakovlevič Rozenbaum) (born September 13, 1951) is a Russian bard from Saint Petersburg.

Among his most famous songs are the ones about Leningrad, the Soviet–Afghan War, Cossacks, and Odessa. Songs such as "Gop-Stop" (a comedy about two gangsters executing an unfaithful lover) and "Vals-boston" (The Boston Waltz) are popular across Russian social groups and generations.

Rosenbaum is an accomplished guitarist and accompanies himself on either a six- or twelve-string acoustic guitar, using the Open G tuning adopted from the Russian seven string guitar.

His attitude toward the criminal song genre can best be illustrated by his own words:

Only a dull-witted person would think that this should not be, that this is wrong. All those songs that I call "songs of confinement," that have lasted and will last, are works of art, and as a rule they are written by cultured and educated people. Because everything that is composed in huge quantities at penitentiaries can very rarely be described as [high quality] work. ... It is very important to understand why those songs are composed, for whom and how. ... They are set in a criminal context, they contain criminal themes, but they are not at all about that. If you read and listen to them carefully, they will tell you of faithfulness, love and many other things. ... I am sometimes asked: "Why do you not write blatnaya pesnya anymore?" I am not interested in it today. The nondescript chaos now has abated somewhat, fortunately, but three, four or five years ago you switched on the crate – and had low-down trash rushing at you... Not the blatnaya pesnya that I treat with respect, but cheap blatota.

== Early life ==
Rosenbaum graduated from the First Pavlov State Medical University of St. Peterburg in 1974, Rosenbaum worked in the medical field for four years. His musical education consists of piano and choreography courses at a musical school. In 1968, while still a student, Rosenbaum started writing the songs for which he is famous. His early songs were for student plays, but he soon also wrote for rock groups and started performing as a singer-songwriter in 1983, sometimes under the pseudonym "Ayarov".

In the 1980s, during the Afghan war, he travelled to Afghanistan several times to sing for the Soviet troops. He dedicated one of his most famous songs, Black tulip, to the Soviet soldiers who participated in that war.

== Political career ==
On December 7, 2003, Alexander Rosenbaum took office as a member of the Russian parliament (the fourth Duma) for United Russia and deputy chairman of the State Duma Culture Committee. When asked by a journalist about what he had to sacrifice to be able to run for MP, Rosenbaum answered:

Spare time. Ostensible respect of a certain group of people. Because it is so easy to kitchen-talk about what had better be done, while never attempting anything yourself. They are false people who think you are a more progressive person if you stay underground barking at the ones in power, rather than take up a seat in the State Duma.

He was not listed as an MP in the fifth Duma.

He is also a supporter of Yisrael Beiteinu Israeli political party and sang the theme tune for the party in the 2009 Israeli legislative election.

Rosenbaum expressed support for the annexation of Crimea by Russia in 2014, and stated, "Crimea is ours." For this he was banned from entering Ukraine.

== Business ventures ==
Rosenbaum is co-owner of a growing (as of 2007) network of beer-halls in Saint-Petersburg, called "Tolstiy Frayer". The name has a humorous, as well as gangster slang air to it and can roughly be rendered as "Fat patsy". The name is a reference to one of Rosenbaum's songs.

== Songwriting and performing characteristics ==
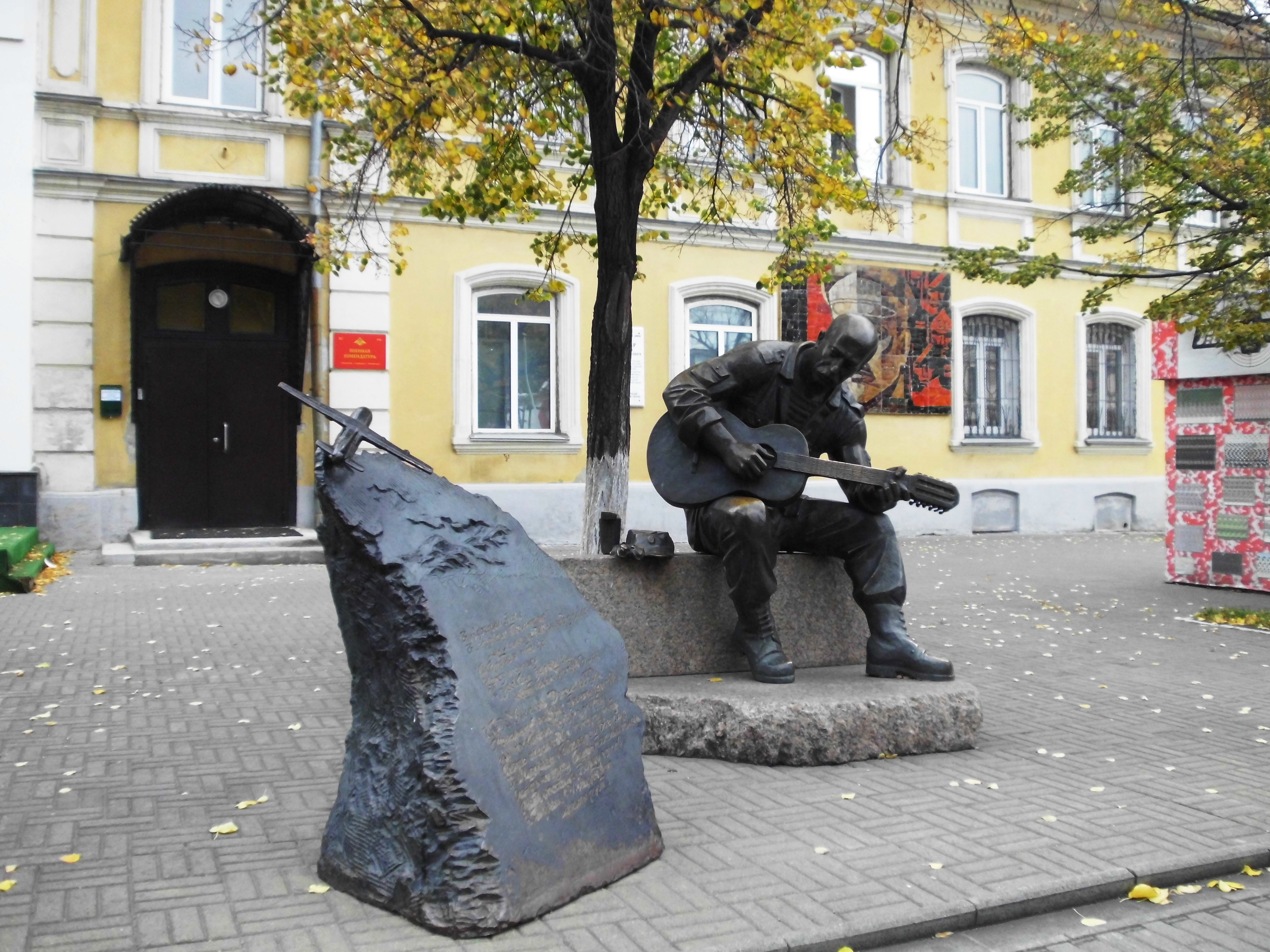
Monument to Alexander Rosenbaum in Chelyabinsk

He has stated that his wide lyrical scope is due to his being a sort of medium. For example, he wrote many crime-related songs using their jargon, but he never lived the criminal life in reality. Similarly, many of his songs about the Cossacks were written without the benefit of ever having a single relative from that community.

Rosenbaum's most popular and culturally relevant song to-date, and his greatest hit, is "Vals-Boston" (Russian: Вàльс-бостòн), which translates to "The Boston Waltz." The title refers to a dance called the American Waltz, or alternatively the Boston.

== Legacy ==
On May 16, 2001, by president Putin's decree, Rosenbaum was awarded the title of People's Artist of Russia, probably the highest title in the artistic field of activity in Russia.

== Discography ==
- Pamyati A. Zvezdina-Severnogo (In memory of A. Zvezdin-Severny; April 1982)
- Noviye pesni on YouTube (New Songs; November 1983)
- Epitafiya on YouTube (Epitaph; 1986)
- Moi dvory on YouTube (My Courtyards; 1986)
- Narisuyte mne dom on YouTube (Paint Me a House; 1986)
- Doroga dlinoyu v zhizn (The Life-long Road; 1988)
- Kazachyi pesni on YouTube (Cossacks Songs; 1988)
- Anafema on YouTube (Anathema; 1988)
- Nyu-Yorkskiy kontsert on YouTube (A New-York Concert; 1987)
- Gop-stop on YouTube (Gop-stop; 1993)
- Goryachaya Desyatka on YouTube (Hot Ten; 1994)
- A. Rozenbaum i "Bratya Zhemchuzhniye" 11 let spustya (A. Rosenbaum and the "Zhemchuzhnye Brothers", 11 years after; 1994)
- Veshchaya sudba (Prophetic Fate; 1994, compilation)
- Nostalgiya on YouTube (Nostalgia; 1994)
- Vyalotekushchaya Shizofreniya (Sluggishly progressing schizophrenia; December 1994)
- Byloye i diski (The Past and the Disks; volumes 1, 2 and 3)
- Antologiya 1. Domashniy kontsert on YouTube (Anthology 1. A Home Concert; 1981)
- Antologiya 2. Posvyashcheniye posvyashchayushchim (Anthology 2. Devoted to the Devoters; 1983)
- Antologiya 3. Kontsert v Vorkute. on YouTube (Anthology 3. A Concert in Vorkuta; 1984)
- Antologiya 4. Kontsert na LOMO (Anthology 4. A Concert at LOMO; 1987)
- Rozoviy zhemchug on YouTube (Pink Pearls; August–November 1995)
- Na plantatsiyah lyubvi on YouTube (On Plantations of Love; March–May 1996)
- Kontsert v den rozhdeniya on YouTube (A Birthday Concert; September 1996)
- Vozvrashcheniye na Argo on YouTube (The Return to Argo; February 1997)
- Iyulskaya zhara on YouTube (July Heat; November 1997)
- Luchshiye pesni (The Best Of; 1982–1997, compilation)
- Transsibirskaya magistral (Trans-Siberian Railway 1999)
- Odinokiy volk (Lonesome Wolf; 2001, compilation)
- Nastoyashchiy soldat on YouTube (Real Soldier; April 2000)
- Staraya gitara (Old Guitar; 2001)
- Ya lyublyu vozvrashchatsya v svoy gorod... (I Love Coming Back to My Town…; 2003)
- Strannaya zhizn on YouTube (Strange Life; 2003)
- Ya vizhu svet (I See the Light; December 2005)
- Poputchiki on YouTube (Fellow travellers; October 2007)
- Mechta blatnogo poeta on YouTube (The Dream of an Underworld Poet November 2009)
- Rubashka naraspashku on YouTube (Unbuttoned Shirt November 2010)
- Berega chistogo bratstva on YouTube (Coast of pure brotherhood with Grigory Leps; December 2011)
- Metafizika on YouTube (Metaphysics; December 2015)
- Simbioz (Symbiosis; 2019) (collection of poems performed by the author)
- Rhythm Liu Blues on YouTube (Rhythm Love Blues; 2020)

== Films about Alexander Rosenbaum ==
- 1987 — Face to face on YouTube (private)
- 1987 — Two hours with bards on YouTube (private)
- 1990 — Reflections of Alexander Rosenbaum on YouTube (private)
- 1994 — Insomnia on YouTube
- 1996 — I can't call myself a star on YouTube
- 1997 — Waltz boston on YouTube
- 1997 — Late express on YouTube
- 2003 — "The Philosophy of the Way" 20 years later (part 1 on YouTube and part 2 on YouTube)
- 2004 — Personal life of Alexander Rosenbaum on YouTube
- 2010 — Men do not cry on YouTube
- 2011 — Strange Life" by Alexander Rosenbaum on YouTube
- 2011 — My amazing dream... on YouTube
- 2016 — Alexander Rosenbaum. I'm closely in the ranks on YouTube
- 2021 — Alexander Rosenbaum. Thirteenth string on YouTube
- 2021 — Dreams by the rose tree on YouTube
- 2021 — One among his own on YouTube
