= Fenya =

Russian cant language used among criminals

Fenya (Russian: феня, IPA: [ˈfʲenʲə]) or fen'ka (Russian: фенька, IPA: [ˈfʲenʲkə]) is a Russian cant language originated among the travelling peddlers and currently used in the Russian criminal underworld and among former detainees of Russian penal establishments ("prison slang"). In modern Russian language it is also referred to as blatnoy language (Russian: блатной язык), where "blatnoy" is a slang expression for "professional criminal". It is also widely used in "thieves' songs" (Russian: "blatnaya pesnya").

== Etymology ==
Initially, this was the name of the Ofenya language (Russian: офенский язык, formerly "Suzdal dialect"). This is a language that was formed in Russia, in the Middle Ages, and was originally used by the ofenyas (travelling peddlers).

The god-haulers — "ofenyas engaged in the resale of icons" — created a cryptolanguage, inventing new roots and leaving the traditional Russian morphology, and used this invented language to communicate "not for other people's ears".

== Overview ==
The grammar of fenya is Russian; the vocabulary has changed over time.

The original fenya consisted of broken Russian words borrowed from Greek and other foreign languages. Vladimir Dahl in his Explanatory Dictionary of the Live Great Russian language gives the following examples:

- "Ропа кимать, полумеркот, рыхло закурещат ворыханы." (Ropa kimat', polumerkot, rykhlo zakureshchat vorykhany.)
  Normative Russian: "Пора спать, полночь; скоро запоют петухи." (Pora spat', polnoch; skoro zapoyut petukhi.)
  Translation: "It's time to go to bed, it's midnight, soon the roosters will be crowing."
- "Да позагорбил басве слемзить: астона басвинска ухалила дряботницей." (Da pozagorbil basve slemzit'; astona basvinska ukhalila dryabotnitsey.)
  Normative Russian: "Да позабыл тебе сказать: жена твоя померла весною." (Da pozabyl tebe skazat': zhena tvoya pomerla vesnoyu.)
  Translation: "Oh, I forgot to tell you: your wife died this spring."

The vocabulary changed over time, with notable infusion of words of Yiddish origin. During the times of the Soviet Union fenya penetrated into common spoken Russian and can no longer be considered cryptic, although it is still commonly associated with those who have connections to the Russian criminal culture or who have spent a significant amount of time incarcerated.

A number of explanations for this phenomenon are suggested. For one, a significant part of the population, not necessarily criminals, survived the Gulag and were released after the death of Joseph Stalin and during the Khrushchev thaw. This resulted in the merger of the culture of Gulag prisoners into everyday Soviet life, which resulted a culture shock on both sides. Particularly members of the intelligentsia, including writers, poets, and journalists who had survived the Gulag as political prisoners, began to regularly use fenya in their writings after their release.

Over time, criminals and black marketeers were covertly admired in working class Soviet culture. This resulted, for example, in "blatnaya songs". Few "common" Russians, however, possess a complete or even complex understanding of fenya and fewer still - for various reasons - will admit to it.

Modern Fenya still influences Russian culture in different ways. In particular, a whole genre of Russian comedy exists, in which a well-known tale, such as Romeo and Juliet, J.R.R. Tolkien's The Lord of the Rings, or even a popular fairy tale is satirized by rewriting the dialogue in fenya.

The dissolution of the Soviet Union and the appearance of "New Russians" introduced new changes into fenya, notably assigning new meanings and accents to common words.

In January 2016, the use of both profanity and fenya by prisoners was banned by the Russian penal system. This followed a 2013 ban on the use of fenya by Russian corrections officers.

== See also ==
- Cant; lists similar languages in other cultures
- Mat (Russian profanity)
- Thief in law
