= Andrey Zvezdzin =

Belarusian footballer

Personal information
- Date of birth: 17 July 1986 (age 40)
- Place of birth: Dobrush, Gomel Oblast, Belarusian SSR
- Height: 1.90 m (6 ft 3 in)
- Position: Goalkeeper

Youth career
- 2003–2005: Dinamo Minsk

Senior career*
Years	Team	Apps	(Gls)
2003	RUOR Minsk	4	(0)
2004	Dinamo-Juni Minsk	7	(0)
2005–2009	Dinamo Brest	0	(0)
2009	Granit Mikashevichi	0	(0)
2010–2011	Khimik Svetlogorsk	15	(0)

International career
2007	Belarus U21	2	(0)
- * Club domestic league appearances and goals

Andrey Zvezdzin (Belarusian: Андрэй Звездзін; Russian: Андрей Звездин; born 17 July 1986) is a retired Belarusian footballer.

== Honours ==
Dinamo Brest

- Belarusian Cup winner: 2006–07
