= Sergey Korzhukov =

Sergey Korzhukov (Russian: Серге́й Коржуков) (December 2, 1959 – July 20, 1994) was a Russian musician and soloist, best known for being the only singer of all Lesopoval songs for the first few years of the band's existence. He died of a ruptured aorta sustained from a fall to the ground from the balcony of his high-rise apartment. Rumors persist that he was pushed.
