= Butyrsky (rural locality) =

Butyrsky (Russian: Бутырский; masculine), Butyrskaya (Бутырская; feminine), or Butyrskoye (Бутырское; neuter) is the name of several rural localities in Russia:

- Butyrskoye, Gladyshevsky Selsoviet, Mishkinsky District, Kurgan Oblast, a village in Gladyshevsky Selsoviet of Mishkinsky District in Kurgan Oblast; 55°23′N 63°34′E
- Butyrskoye, Rozhdestvensky Selsoviet, Mishkinsky District, Kurgan Oblast, a selo in Rozhdestvensky Selsoviet of Mishkinsky District in Kurgan Oblast; 55°18′N 63°38′E
- Butyrskaya, Primorsky District, Arkhangelsk Oblast, a village in Koskogorsky Selsoviet of Primorsky District in Arkhangelsk Oblast; 64°21′N 41°29′E
- Butyrskaya, Verkhnetoyemsky District, Arkhangelsk Oblast, a village in Seftrensky Selsoviet of Verkhnetoyemsky District in Arkhangelsk Oblast; 62°21′N 44°35′E
