= Yuri Aleksandrovich Istomin =

Yuri Aleksandrovich Istomin (born January 4, 1975, Inta, Komi ASSR, USSR) is a singer-songwriter, some of which were published under the pseudonym "Kolyma Group" and sold in Russia in excess of 1 million copies in 1997-2005. Monegasque entrepreneur, writer and investor. Author of the book Realitology, founder of the Realitology Institute in Monaco, founder of the AI company "iQIn-research".

In 1997-2005, starting in Russia, during his first business in Moscow, the record company Russian Hit, he also sold over 1 million copies on audio cassettes and compact discs with his own songs – more than 100 total.

Some of the songs were released under his own name, some in the "Russian chanson" style under the pseudonym "Kolyma Group".

After a 20-year break, in 2025 he released the album “Transplant in Istanbul”.

== Biography ==
Istomin was born in Inta, Komi ASSR, a mining town with a population of 50,000 people where political prisoners and ethnic Germans, Poles, Romanians and others were sent to "settlements" from the 1930s to the 1970s.

His father was a miner, his mother was a teacher.

When Yuri was 5 years old, his parents separated and he was then "raised by the streets and libraries". He studied and graduated from art and music schools, engaged a ship modeling.

During schoolyears, he participated in all-Russian Olympiads in mathematics, physics and computer science.

Istomin started earning his first money at the age of 12, working as an artist in the city library and the city cinema, and during the summer holidays at the age of 14 and 15, he worked part-time as a "Surface Miner" on the conveyors of the Kapitalnaya mine. At the age of 15, he began his entrepreneurial career: in 1990, he founded a self-supporting discotheque in the Shakhtyor cultural center in Inta. In 1991, he moved to Moscow, where he began his scientific, business and singer careers. In 2015, he moved to live in Monaco.

== Education ==
Graduated from the Institute of Culture, specializing in cultural studies. Moscow Humanitarian University — PhD dissertation in sociology “Socio-cultural codes and mentality”.

== Music ==
Istoimn began writing his first poems at the age of 12. While studying at the university, he won a competition of anti-war songs about the war in Afghanistan with the song "These 10 Long Years".

While working for the Russian Hit company, he released 5 albums, some under his own name, some under the pseudonym "Kolyma Group".

However, the group itself never existed and Yuri himself never gave solo concerts. The songs of "Kolyma Group" were used in the films "Rublevskie zheny" and "Moscow, I Endure You", a story about the group was filmed in the program "Namedni".

"Bagryanye Listy" and "My Favorite" clips were in radio and television active rotation. Istomin's current work includes reflections on science, art, technology and topics related to artificial intelligence. He also uses AI as a companion in his poetic and musical creativity.

== Hobbies ==
Istomin is a contemporary art collector, his collection includes works of such authors as Georg Baselitz, Adrian Ghenie, Marlene Dumas, Tony Cragg, Yayoi Kusama, Rudolf Stingel, Gunther Forg and others.

His second interest is offshore fishing. He is the creator and designer of the world's most customized oceanographic yacht, Singularity.

== Discography ==
- 1998. For Those Who Are There
- 2002. Well, Here We Are at Home
- 2003. Rublevskoye Shosse
- 2005. Flocks of Cranes
- 2005. Moscow Bandit
- 2005. The Boys
- 2005. Dembelya
- 2025. Transfer in Istanbul (released - 01.02.2025).
