= Butyrki, Astrakhan Oblast =

Butyrki Бутырки
- Khutor
- Location within Astrakhan Oblast Location within Russia
- Coordinates: 48°11′N 46°16′E
- Country: Russia
- Region: Astrakhan Oblast
- District: Akhtubinsky District
- Time zone: UTC+4:00

Butyrki (Russian: Бутырки) is a rural locality (a khutor) in Uspensky Selsoviet of Akhtubinsky District, Astrakhan Oblast, Russia. The population was 48 as of 2010. There is 1 street.

== Geography ==
Butyrki is located 16 km (9.9 mi) southeast of Akhtubinsk (the district's administrative centre) by road. Uspenka is the nearest rural locality.
