= Mikhail Tanich =

Soviet and Russian poet (1923–2008)

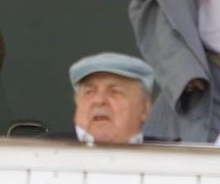
Mikhail Tanich in 2007

Mikhail Isaievich Tanich (Tankhilevich) (Russian: Михаил Исаевич Танич) (September 15, 1923 – April 17, 2008) was a popular Russian song lyrics writer, a laureate of the Interior Ministry Award (1997), a laureate of the jubilee contest The Song of the Year devoted to the 25th anniversary of that television program, a laureate of nearly all the annual festivals The Song of the Year, and a laureate of the Ovation National Music Award (1997).

== Biography ==
Mikhail Isaevich Tankhilevich was born in Taganrog in a Jewish family. He graduated from the Rostov Civil Engineering College (Rostov-on-Don, Russia). He was in the Army during World War II, participated at the Battle of Berlin and was awarded with an Order of Glory of 3rd degree. After the end of the war, he entered the Rostov Engineering and Construction Institute, from which he did not manage to graduate. In 1947, he was arrested on the grounds of false accusations, and spent time in prison until 1953. Many years later, he confessed in a TV interview, ‘I served 6 years in one of the most horrible Stalinist camps for some nonsense, for a joke, a word.’ After his release, he lived on Sakhalin and worked as a foreman at Stroymekhmontazh. Not being rehabilitated, he could not settle in Moscow, although his cousin lived there. At the age of thirty-three, he married eighteen-year-old Lydia Kozlova. In 1956 Tanich was rehabilitated. The couple moved to Orekhovo-Zuyevo, and after a while - to Zheleznodorozhnyi.

His first book of collected poems was published in 1959. He then went on to write a total of fifteen books.

In the beginning of the 1960s he wrote a song The Textile Town, written in collaboration with the Soviet composer Yan Frenkel, became a hit. It was sung by a number of popular singers including Raisa Nemetova and Maya Kristalinskaya. Together with Yury Saulsky, the poet wrote the schlager ‘Black Cat’. Tanich also called the patriotic song ‘Confession of Love’, written together with Serafim Tulikov, one of his favourite songs.

He has also co-authored with many Soviet composers such as Yuri Saulsky, Arkady Ostrovsky, Vadim Gamaliya, Oscar Feltsman, Nikita Bogoslovsky, Vladimir Shainsky. Other composers Tanich has worked with include Igor Nikolayev, Arkady Ukupnik and Vyacheslav Malezhik.

In the mid-1980s Tanich began composing poems for the most popular composers of the time - David Tukhmanov and Raimond Pauls. In 1991, he wrote the lyrics to Alexander Malinin's song ‘New Star’. Tanich collaborated with Alyona Apina, whom the poet considered ‘his singer’, as well as Larisa Dolina. He continued his long-standing collaboration with Edita Piekha.

Along with Sergey Korzhukov who died in 1994, Mikhail Tanich cofounded the group Lesopoval.

== Death ==
Mikhail Tanich died on 17 April 2008 at the 85th year of life in Moscow, the cause of death was chronic renal failure and long-term cancer. He was buried on 19 April 2008 in section 25 (behind the columbarium building) of Vagankovo Cemetery in Moscow.

== Family ==
- Spouse – lyrics writer Lydia Kozlova
- Children – Inga Kozlova, Svetlana Kozlova

== Achievements and awards ==
- Laureate of the Interior Ministry Award (1997)
- Laureate of the Ovation National Music Award (1997)
- Order of the Red Star
- Order or Honour (1998)
- Order of the Patriotic War (1985)
- Order of Glory (1945)
- People's Artist of Russia (2003)
- Honored Professor at the Rostov State Civil Engineering College
