= Russian chanson =

Variety of genres of Russian music

- Native name: Русский шансон
- Stylistic origins: Russian romance; klezmer; culture of Odessa; Romani music; Armenian music; bard music; estrada; samizdat; fenya; Russian criminal songs
- Cultural origins: 20th century, Russia

Russian chanson (Russian: русский шансон, romanized: russkiy shanson; from French "chanson") is a neologism for a musical genre covering a range of Russian songs, including city romance songs, author song performed by singer-songwriters, and blatnaya pesnya or "criminals' songs" that are based on the themes of the urban underclass and the criminal underworld.

== History ==
The Russian chanson originated in the Russian Empire. The songs sung by serfs and political prisoners of the Tsar are very similar in content to the songs sung in the Soviet Union and the Russian Federation today. However, during the Soviet Union, the style changed, and the songs became part of the culture of samizdat and dissent.

During the Khrushchev thaw, the Soviet Union released a lot of prisoners from the gulag. When the former prisoners returned from the gulags back to their homes in the 1950s, the songs that they had sung in the camps became popular with Soviet students and nonconformist intelligentsia. Then, in the second half of the 1960s, the more conservative Leonid Brezhnev and Alexei Kosygin made a slight reversal to this process, albeit never reaching the tight, stringent controls experienced during the Stalin era. This, combined with the influx of cheap and portable magnetic tape recorders led to an increase in the popularity and consumption of the criminal songs. These songs were performed by Soviet bards; folk singers who sung with simple guitar accompaniment. Since Soviet culture officials did not approve of the songs, many of the bards initially became popular playing at small, private student parties. The attendees at these gatherings would record the concert with a tape recorder. The songs of the bards spread through the sharing and recopying of these tapes.

After the fall of the Soviet Union and the establishment of the Russian Federation, the musical style of the songs began to shift, although the content did not. Modern artists affiliated with the Chanson genre often sing not in the traditional style used even by the Khrushchev-era performers, but more professionally, borrowing musical arrangements from pop, rock, and jazz. Although the strict cultural control of the Soviet Union has ended, many Russian officials still publicly denounce the genre. Russia's prosecutor general, Vladimir Ustinov, referred to the songs as "propaganda of the criminal subculture". However, there is a radio station called Radio Chanson that broadcasts chanson round the clock. Radio Chanson is also the founder of the Chanson of the Year awards ceremony held annually at Russia's main concert venue, the State Kremlin Palace, awarding artists performing in the genre. Many politicians are fans of the genre, and one of the popular modern chanson singers, Alexander Rosenbaum, was a member of the Duma as part of the United Russia Party. Rosenbaum was also awarded the title of People's Artist of Russia by a decree of Vladimir Putin.

In the Russian music industry, the term "Russian chanson" was introduced as a euphemism in the 1990s, when criminal songs began to be heard on stage, radio, and television, and were popularized by the Moscow radio station of the same name, the St. Petersburg radio station Night Taxi, and the production companies Master Sound Records (which existed from 1997 to 2017) and "Russian Chanson" (2002–2016), along with their subsidiaries. The founder and director of Russian Chanson, who remained active until his death in 2006, was businessman and producer Yuri Nikolaevich Sevostianov (1961–2006).

Since 2002, the Song of the Year award ceremony has been held at the State Kremlin Palace with the participation of these production companies, and its official founder was the management of Radio Chanson. The participants were performers of a wide variety of genres and styles, sometimes loosely related to song.

== Reactions ==
=== Soviet officials ===
Many of the Soviet bards also worked as writers and actors for the Soviet state. These artists were required to submit their works to government censors for approval. When bards performed uncensored pieces which fans would then distribute, they risked their official jobs. In December 1971 a popular Soviet bard, Alexander Galich, was expelled from the Union of Soviet Writers for publishing uncensored works abroad and making his views known to large groups of people in the Soviet Union, which Galich claims happened after a Politburo member heard a tape of Galich’s uncensored songs at his daughter's wedding reception. Galich describes the official backlash following his expulsion from the Union of Soviet Writers in an open letter to the International Committee on Human Rights that he wrote after being denied permission to travel abroad: “I am deprived of...the right to see my work published, the right to sign a contract with a theater, film studio, or publishing house, the right to perform in public.” Other bards who were not official Soviet artist still risked their job by performing uncensored songs. In 1968 Yuli Kim, a Russian language and literature teacher at a boarding school attached to Moscow State University, was dismissed for performing uncensored songs critical of the Soviet Union. Although the official stance of the Soviet Union towards these songs was intolerant, many Soviet officials enjoyed the uncensored tapes. Bulat Okudzhava, a bard often criticized by Soviet officials, was invited to give a concert at the Soviet embassy in Warsaw.

In addition to active repression from the state, Soviet bards also faced criticisms on the literary merit of their songs from Soviet officials. Even songs that were not openly critical of the Soviet union, like the songs of Vladimir Vysotsky, came under attack for their content and the way they were performed. The transgression was not anti-Soviet content, like the songs of Galich, but content that was considered "un-soviet", and contributed the denigration of the Soviet people. During a meeting of 140 writers, artists and film workers in 1962, Leonid Ilyichev, chairman of the Ideological Commission of the Soviet Communist Party's Central Committee, criticized the songs of Okudzhava. Ilyichev called them "vulgar songs...designed to appeal to low and cheap tastes" and said they were "out of keeping with the entire structure of [Soviet] life". Artists in Soviet service also criticized the bards that sung unapproved songs. The newspaper Sovetskaia Rossiia (Soviet Russia) attacked Vysotsky for offering "Philistinism, vulgarity, and immorality" under the "guise of art". Although Vysotsky was often criticized by officials, he never faced imprisonment or exile like other bards. This was in part due to his use of sarcasm as opposed to criticism, his lack of political activity, but mainly due to his immense popularity among the Soviet People.

Gradually, Soviet authorities eased their reactions to the bards who sang outlaw songs. In 1981, after Vysotsky's death, the state allowed the publication of a collection of his poetry (although official state poets still attacked Vysotsky's poems). During Gorbachev’s reign, Gorbachev's policy of glasnost made the outlaw songs officially acceptable. The songs which previously needed to be distributed unofficially through personally copied tapes could now be purchased in stores. In 1987, Vysotsky was posthumously awarded the state literary prize. The songs that were more directly critical of Soviet Union, however, authorities largely ignored.

=== Soviet public ===
The public appeal of the outlaw songs in the Soviet Union was fueled by the contrast between the outlaw songs and state-sanctioned music. The outlaw songs did not have the same civic-minded messages as their official counterparts, and were instead much more personal. They touched on subjects taboo in Soviet society, like antisemitism, the growing class divide and the power abuses of the political elite. The more personal nature of the music both in content and style, gave it a sense of authenticity, something that led to the mass appeal of the songs. The songs were often very crude, an aspect of which was heavily criticized by the state, and echoed by some Soviet Citizens outside of the government.

== Themes ==
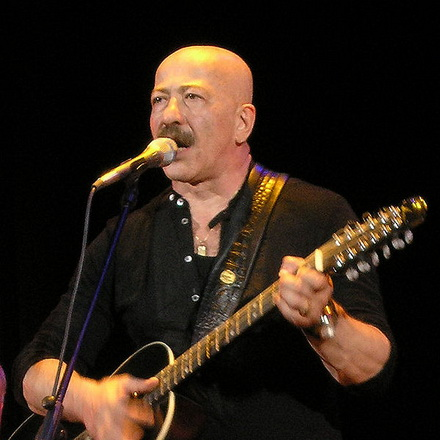
Alexander Rosenbaum is known as both a bard and a performer of Russian chanson

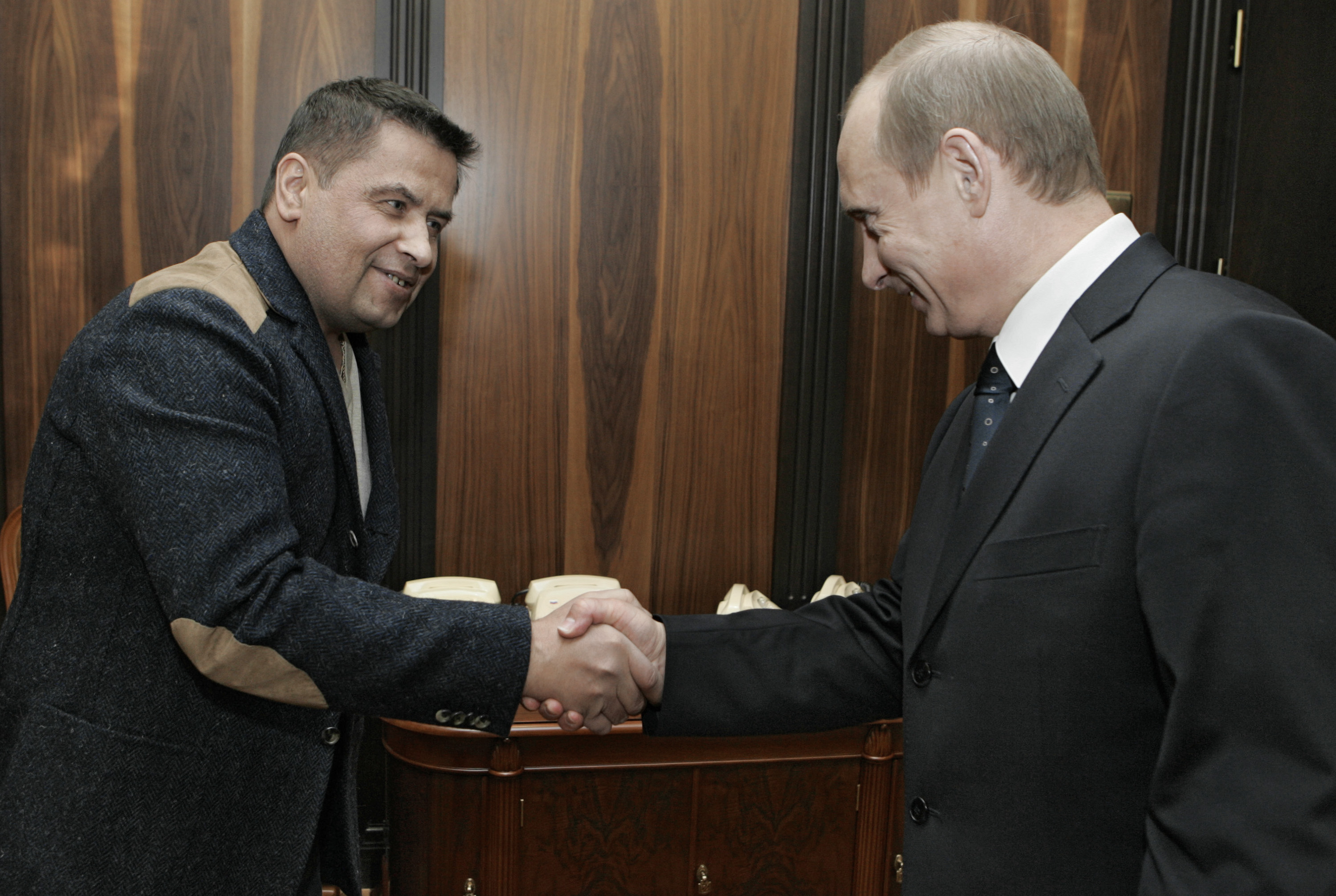
Lyube is reputed as Vladimir Putin's favorite band

Lyrically, Chanson songs are usually narrative-driven and are more similar to ballads than pop songs. In fact, this is one of the reasons for naming the genre after the French Chanson (the other being musical similarity).

Chanson themes vary greatly depending on the time in which the songs were written and the places in which they are set. For example, songs set in the Odessa of the 1910s tend to be more cheerful, and are sharply contrasted by the dark, depressing, and violent songs set in the Stalinist era. The interesting thing is that it is common for a Chanson artist, regardless of the time in which he writes his songs, to include songs of all periods in his repertoire, and write songs set in an era different from his own. This often leads to confusion: for example, the bard Alexander Gorodnitsky reports being beaten up once after claiming authorship to one of his songs, which was attributed to a Gulag inmate living over 30 years earlier.

Recurring themes in Chanson songs include:

- Military and patriotic themes. There is a subgenre of Chanson known as Military chanson.
- White Guard (anticommunist side of the Russian Civil War)
- The execution of a traitor to a criminal gang (the first such song is probably "Murka"). This is usually in the context of the Russian criminals' law, which punishes betrayal very harshly.
- Being sent to, or released from, a labor camp.
- Love in the context of criminal life, the conflict usually being either betrayal or separation due to imprisonment.
- Glorification of the 'merry thief' archetype. These songs are often set in the city of Odessa, where the Jewish Mafia was characterized as being particularly cheerful and colorful. Odessa Couplets often depict the rich and glorious life before Stalin's regime, when Odessa was among the only cities in the young Soviet Union to have free trade. These songs are often narrations of weddings and parties, sometimes based on real events.
- Political satire of different forms.
- Appeal to emotions towards relatives or beloved ones, often leading unlawful or morally controversial lives.

As seen above, chanson is rooted in prison life and criminal culture, but some chanson performers insist that the genre transcends mere criminal songs, and look upon Alexander Vertinsky and Alla Bayanova as their precursors.

== Musical style ==
The musical style of the older Russian criminal songs, much like the Russian Bard songs, are heavily influenced by the classical Russian romance genre of the 19th century, more specifically a subgenre known as the City or Urban Romance. Romance songs are almost always divided into four-line rhymed couplets, rarely have a chorus, and follow a fairly consistent chord progression (Am, Dm, and E, sometimes with C and G added). The strumming pattern is also predictable: it is either a march, or a slow 3/4 waltz pattern often utilizing fingerpicking rather than strumming. Romance songs were traditionally played on a Russian guitar, since its tuning makes playing these chords easier (most of them are played as a single-finger bar chord).

== Performers ==
Criminal songs were prominently performed by artists like Arcady Severny, Vladimir Vysotsky, Alexander Gorodnitsky, and Alexander Rosenbaum. Notice that with the exception of Severny, these performers are usually better known for their Bard songs. Arkady was one of the rare performers who focuses exclusively on collecting and performing old criminal songs.

Modern chanson performers include the band Lesopoval, Lyube, Spartak Arutyunyan and Belomorkanal Band, Boka (Russian-Armenian Chanson), Ivan Kuchin, Butyrka, Aleksandr Novikov, Willi Tokarev, Mikhail Shufutinsky, Lubov' Uspenskaya, Yuri Istomin and Mikhail Krug. Some of the early performers are Leonid Utesov, Alexander Vertinsky, Pyotr Leshchenko, Izabella Yurieva, etc.

A more recent artist who plays chanson with Rock music are Grigory Leps, Vika Tsyganova. Elena Vaenga, another recently popularized singer, actress and songwriter, sings in the styles of Russian shanson, folk music and folk rock.

Mikhail Tanich was one of the most popular poets in this genre.

British singer Marc Almond is the only western artist to receive acclaim in western Europe as well as Russia for singing English versions of Russian Romances and Russian Chanson on his albums Heart on Snow and Orpheus in Exile.

== See also ==
- Turbo-folk
