= CYGO (rapper) =

Belarusian rapper

- Born: Leonid Vakulchuk; 6 June 1998 (age 27); Mogilev, Belarus
- Genres: Hip hop
- Occupations: Rapper; songwriter
- Labels: Klever Label

Leonid Vakulchuk (Russian: Леонид Вакульчук; Belarusian: Леанід Вакульчук; born 6 June 1998), known professionally as CYGO, is a Belarusian rapper and songwriter. He became famous in 2018 with the song "Panda E", which eventually became the most popular song of the whole year on the social network "VKontakte".

== Early life ==
Vakulchuk was born on 6 June 1998 in Mogilev, Belarus. Since the 5th grade he began to participate in vocal and reader contests, where he won prizes. When he was 10 years old, his parents divorced and he decided to live with his father and moved to Brest.

== Career ==
In the summer of 2018, Cygo presented the single "Panda E", which took the leading places in the well-known charts and went double platinum. The song entered the Apple Music charts (1st place), Boom (1st place), Top YouTube Hits (1st place), Top Radio Hits (5th place), iTunes (9th place), Yandex.Music (14th place). Later the video was shot on the single. The Ukrainian comedy project «Chotkiy Paca» together with the artist and actor Aleksandr Zherebko made a parody of this composition. The Music video-parody «True» immediately after the premiere appeared in the "Trends" section on YouTube. His second song was "Thaw now", which he presented in the same year. The next song of the singer was "Sick in the head".

In 2019, Cygo released an album called Crazy can't live without her. The album includes 4 songs: "Crazy can't live without her", "Black Rose", "You are a sin" and "Ааа".

== Discography ==
Year	Name	Detailed
2019	Crazy can't live without her	Released: 4 February 2019; Format: Music download; Label: Klever Label
2019	«Low Love E»	Released: 22 November 2019; Format: Music download; Label: CD Land Contact
