= Mikhail Shufutinsky =

Russian singer (born 1948)

Mikhail Shufutinsky Михаил Шуфутинский
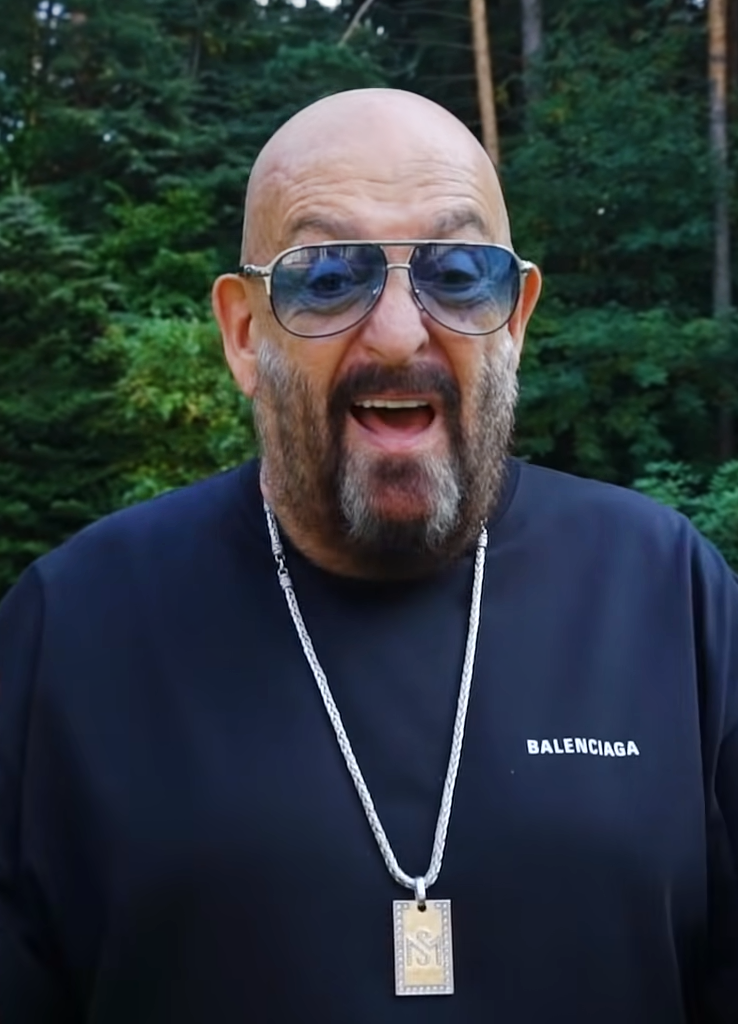
- Shufutinsky in 2021

Background information
- Born: Mikhail Zakharovich Shufutinsky; 13 April 1948 (age 78); Moscow, Russian SFSR, Soviet Union
- Genres: Russian chanson, Pop
- Occupations: Singer, composer
- Instruments: Vocals, Accordion, Piano
- Website: shufutinsky.ru

Mikhail Zakharovich Shufutinsky (Russian: Михаил Захарович Шуфутинский; born 13 April 1948) is a Russian pop singer. He is currently the pre-eminent singer of Russian chanson music. He was awarded the title of Meritorious Artist of Russia in 2013 and the title People's Artist of Russia in 2026.

== Biography ==
Shufutinsky was born on 13 April 1948 in Moscow. His father, Zakhar Davidovich Shufutinski, was a Jewish World War II doctor and veteran. When he was five years old, his mother died and he was then raised by his grandmother, Berta Davidovna, and his grandfather, David Yakovlevich.

Majoring in the accordion, Shufutinsky graduated from the Ippolitov-Ivanov State Musical Pedagogical Institute with a specialization in the choral Coryphaeus style.

He appeared with different bands in Moscow and Magadan, performing songs by Alexander Vertinsky and Pyotr Leshchenko, and later became leader of the instrumental band "Leisya, Pesnia", which usually played songs by Vyacheslav Dobrynin.

At some point, Mikhail visited Los Angeles for a concert and immediately fell in love with the city. This was during the boom of the Russian restaurant business in Los Angeles. As a famous singer and musician, Shufutinsky was offered a job in the Arbat restaurant in Burbank, California. Shufutinsky had surprising success as an immigrant performer despite American expectations against Russians.

In 1981, Shufutinsky and his family immigrated to the USA. Within 10 years, he had appeared with many bands in different restaurants, and created his own show, "Ataman-band" (named after the restaurant Ataman). Nowadays, he regularly tours in Russia. In 1990, he accepted an invitation to visit Russia and sang concerts in 75 sold-out stadiums.

In 1998, Shufutinsky wrote an autobiography named I vot stoiu ia na puti... ("Here I stand at a line)").

In 2003, Shufutinsky returned to Russia as a permanent resident. He still remains a US citizen.

His repertoire contains songs by songwriters Vyacheslav Dobrynin ("Two candles" [Russian: Две свечи]), Igor Krutoy ("The 3rd of September" [Russian: Третье сентября]; "Palma de Mallorca"; "Moscow taxi" [Russian: Московское такси]; "Moscow doesn’t believe in tears" [Russian: Москва слезам не верит]), Oleg Mityaev ("Night guest" [Russian: Ночной гость]), Aleksandr Rozenbaum ("Khreschatik", "Zakhodite k nam na ogoniok" - "Visit our place", "Gop-stop"), Oleg Gazmanov, Igor Zubkov, Vatslav Lisovskii, Olesia Atlanova, Karen Kavaleryan, and many others.

In January 2023, Ukraine imposed sanctions on Mikhail for his support of 2022 Russian invasion of Ukraine.

== Discography ==
| Russian name | Translation | Year | Notes |
|---|---|---|---|
| Побег | Escape | 1982 | |
| Атаман | Ataman | 1983 | |
| Гулливер | Gulliver | 1984 | |
| Атаман — 2 | Ataman 2 | 1984 | |
| Амнистия | Amnesty | 1985 | |
| Атаман—3 | Ataman 3 | 1986 | |
| Белый аист | White Ciconia Bird | 1987 | |
| Нет проблем | No Problems | 1988 | |
| Ты у меня единственная | You Are My Only One | 1989 | together with Suzanne Tepper |
| Подмосковные вечера | Moscow Nights | 1990 | |
| Моя жизнь | My Life | 1991 | |
| Тихий Дон | Quiet River Don | 1992 | |
| Киса-киса | Kisa-Kisa | 1993 | |
| Гуляй, душа | Have a good time, my soul | 1994 | |
| О, Женщины | Oh, Women | 1995 | |
| Добрый вечер, господа | Good Evening, Gentlemen | 1996 | |
| Однажды в Америке | Once in America | 1998 | songs by Igor Krutoy |
| Ну и ради Бога | For God's Sake | 1999 | |
| Я родился в Москве | I Was Born in Moscow | 2001 | |
| Наколочка | Tattoo | 2002 | |
| Бум-Бум | Boom-Boom | 2003 | |
| Пополам | Half-half | 2004 | together with Irina Allegrova |
| Соло | Solo | 2005 | |
| Дуэты разных лет | Duets of Various Years | 2006 | |
| Москва-Владивосток | Moscow-Vladivostok | 2007 | |
| Брато | Brato | 2009 | |
| Дуэты разных лет 2 | Duets of Various Years 2 | 2010 | |
| Love Story | | 2013 | |
| Я просто медленно люблю | I Simply Slowly Love | 2016 | |
| Ты моя жизнь | You're My Life | 2020 | |

== Filmography ==
=== Roles ===
- 1984 — Moscow on the Hudson as an unnamed restaurant singer.

=== Soundtracks ===
- 2012 — Brave — King Fergus (Russian dubbing; originally voiced by Billy Connolly)
- 2014 — Vacation of Little Nicole — director of school (original voice - Francis Perren)

== Books ==
- 1997 — Михаил Шуфутинский. «И вот стою я у черты...» (Here I stand at a line) (Thrien publishing — ISBN 5-7961-0013-0)
- 2004 — Михаил Шуфутинский. «Лучшие песни. Тексты и аккорды» (Best songs. Texts and accords) (ISBN 985-13-2098-6)
- 2021 — Даниил Ветлужских, Влад Максименко. «3 сентября» (The 3rd of September) (ISBN 978-5-6043933-3-8)

== Recognition and awards ==
- 1997 — Silver Rubber Shoe Award «Серебряная калоша»
- 2013 — Honorary title of recognized Russian performer («Заслуженный артист Российской Федерации»), for artistic achievements.

== Sanctions ==
In January 2023 Ukraine imposed sanctions on Mikhail Shufutinsky for promoting Russia during the 2022 Russian invasion of Ukraine.
