= Arkady Severny =

Soviet singer

Arkady Dmitriyevich Severny Аркадий Дмитриевич Северный

Background information
- Born: Arkady Zvezdin; 12 March 1939; Ivanovo, Russian SFSR, Soviet Union (now Russia)
- Origin: Leningrad, Soviet Union
- Died: 12 April 1980 (aged 41) Leningrad, Soviet Union (now Saint Petersburg, Russia)
- Genres: Russian chanson, bard, pop rock
- Years active: 1963–1980

Arkady Dmitriyevich Severny (Note: Russian: Арка́дий Дми́триевич Се́верный) (né Zvezdin (Note: Russian: Зве́здин); 12 March 1939 – 12 April 1980) was a Soviet Russian folk singer. He was very popular in the Soviet Union in the 1970s, primarily because of his criminal songs. He sang more than 1,000 songs based on criminal folklore and literature. Severny worked with well-known Russian jazz and restaurant musicians. He recorded more than 80 albums, both solo and orchestral.

== Early life ==
Arkady Dmitriyevich Zvezdin was born in the town of Ivanovo, near Moscow. Contrary to popular belief, in his childhood years he was neither a hooligan nor a poor pupil. He belonged to the so-called "golden youth", with his father occupying a senior position on the Ivanovo railroad. The young Arkady did well at school, and loved to play the seven-string guitar. Owing to a near-eidetic memory, he could perform a large number of songs. His older sister once gave him a thick copybook filled with song lyrics, including numerous prison songs; he quickly learned this peculiar repertoire and eagerly sang such songs in polite company.

After graduating from school in 1957, Severny left for Leningrad, where he enrolled in the S.M. Kirov Forestry Academy, and participated in amateur musical and theatrical productions, including student ensembles that wrote and performed their own songs written in English in the style of Louis Armstrong. Having become completely engrossed in student amateur art, he did not study very diligently and after each term was on the verge of being expelled. Finally, he had to discontinue his studies for a while and took an academic leave of absence.

== First recordings ==
Once, in the company of friends, Severny sang about a dozen songs, which he recorded on tape. In 1963, his first recordings, with a total recording time of 35–40 minutes, were released. Upon receiving his degree in 1965, he was given an administrative job at SoyuzEksportLes (Wood Export Union). Nevertheless, working in an office environment was of little interest to him; he wanted to sing. In the summer of 1967, Severny became acquainted with one Rudolf Fuchs, a person who recorded singers and songwriters who played the guitar. Fuchs had the idea of producing the novice's first album in the form of a refined hoax, specifically a non-existent radio program, which was allegedly broadcast on the Soviet airwaves. Severny performed prison songs on the radio at the request of the program's listening audience. The fake radio program turned out to be a major success, due to the provocative nature of the songs that were allegedly performed on Soviet radio.

The pseudonym Severny was adopted as a matter of style. In the 1960s, many of the Soviet Union's Gulags were located in the north of Russia. Severny, being the Russian word for "northern", fit Severny's carefully cultivated image as a prison singer perfectly. Secondly, the pseudonym served as a cover, since in those years one could actually be sent to prison for giving underground concerts.

== Popularity ==
In 1968, Severny was discharged from the Soviet Army, where he had served as lieutenant for a year in a helicopter regiment not far from Leningrad. Having demobilized, the singer learned that during the period of his mandatory service, his popularity as a singer had grown considerably. He then received an invitation from producer Sergei Maklakov. Severny performed his songs throughout an entire evening at Maklakov's residence, resulting in 500 meters of recordings on the now outdated reel-to-reel tape recorder that were quickly disseminated throughout the entire Soviet Union and eventually gave rise to the popularity of the performer's prison songs. It was with great pleasure that music lovers all over the country listened to the singer's slightly hoarse voice performing such revived songs as Roast Chicken, School of Ballet Dance, I Lived in Noisy Odessa, Mother, I’m In Love With A Pilot, Tram #10 Passed By, and many others. During the recording, Severny would shout interjections such as "In Odessa-", "Back when I was in Odessa-", and other similar lyrics, mimicking the style found in the city of Odessa, known for its criminal culture. This, too, was part of his carefully cultivated image. Indeed, many of Severny's listeners actually believed that he was from Odessa.

== Personal life ==
- First wife: Nina, telegraph operator.
- Second wife: Valentina Sergeevna Boytsova; they separated after six years. Daughter: Natalia (born in 1971).
- Third wife (unofficially): Zinaida; they lived together for less than a year.

== Death ==
On 12 April 1980, Severny died from a massive intracerebral hemorrhage while staying at a friend's house in Leningrad. Due to circumstances which are not entirely clear, the urn containing his ashes disappeared before burial could take place. Therefore, his "tomb" in Saint Petersburg is in fact a cenotaph.

== Legacy ==
Severny managed to combine and concentrate practically the entire international lexicon of the "prison song" genre. Moreover, although it was understood that Severny himself performed as a character, and was not himself a criminal, the genre remained one of the most prominent in the 1970s and 1980s underground scene.

It should also be noted that the official culture of the Soviet "stagnation" period not only had as its foil the light non-conformism coming from the direction of the intelligentsia, but also the dark culture of the Soviet criminal underworld. Because Severny was not recognized by the authorities as a singer, he became a cult figure in the Soviet Union, with the population clamouring to get recordings of his underground concerts. Russian criminal culture thus became an essential integral part of the greater Russian culture.
