= Golden Gramophone Award =

Yearly national Russian music award

Golden Gramophone
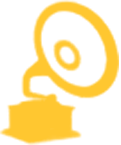
- Awarded for: a reward to the performer for a song
- Country: Russia
- Presented by: Russkoe Radio
- First award: 1996
- Website: grammofon.rusradio.ru/

The Golden Gramophone Award (Russian: Золотой граммофон, romanized: Zolotoy grammofon) is a yearly national Russian music award, established by Russian Radio in 1996. The awardee receives a gold-colored figurine of a gramophone.

== Recipients ==
Complete list of artists who received prizes until 2021:
23 figurines:
Philipp Kirkorov
19 figurines:
Nikolay Baskov
16 figurines:
Valery Meladze
14 figurines:
Grigory Leps
13 figurines:
Ani Lorak

Kristina Orbakaitė

Valeriya

12 figurines:
Dima Bilan

Lyube

Sofia Rotaru

11 figurines:
Dmitry Malikov
10 figurines:
Nu Virgos

Leonid Agutin

Vera Brezhneva

9 figurines:
Ivanushki International

Stas Piekha

Jasmin

Dima Bilan

Stas Mikhaylov

MakSim

Ruki Vverh!

Polina Gagarina

Slava

8 figurines:
Diskoteka Avariya

Blestyashchiye

Alla Pugacheva

Anita Tsoy

Zara

Sergey Lazarev

Yolka

7 figurines:
Anzhelika Varum

Eva Polna

Glukoza

Gradusy

Yulia Savicheva

6 figurines:

Tatiana Bulanova

Nyusha

Taisia Povaliy

Chay Vdvoyom

Vladimir Presnyakov Jr.

5 figurines:
A-Studio

Alsou

Fabrika

Victoria Dayneko

Nikolai Noskov

Sergei Trofimov

Sogdiana Fedorinskaya

Denis Maidanov

Artik & Asti

Irina Dubtsova

Irakli

Aleksandr Revva

Serebro

Bi-2

4 figurines:
Boris Moiseev

Potap & Nastya Kamenskykh

Valery Leontiev

Verka Serduchka

Vintage

Lolita Milyavskaya

Elena Vaenga

Otpetye moshenniki

Hi-Fi

Aleksandr Marshal

Nochnye Snaipery

Max Barskih

Burito

Svetlana Loboda

GeeGun

Irina Allegrova

Korni

Oleg Gazmanov

3 figurines:
Cabaret-duet "Akademiya"

Artyom Kacher

Dmitry Koldun

Mitya Fomin

Alyona Sviridova

Band'Eros

Dan Balan

Zveri

Diana Gurtskaya

Katya Lel

Nadezhda Kadysheva

Natasha Koroleva

Neschastny Sluchai

Seryoga

Strelki

Tantsy Minus

Uma2rman

Nargiz Zakirova

Chelsi

Emin Agalarov

Reflex

Filatov & Karas

Avraam Russo

Ariana

Maxim Fadeev

Yulianna Karaulova

2 figurines:
5sta Family

Alexander Kogan

Alexander Rosenbaum

Alena Apina

Andrey Gubin

Bianka

Velvet

Vyacheslav Dobrynin

Mot

Gorod 312

DJ Smash

Zolotoe Koltso

Mari Kraimbrery

Marina Khlebnikova

Mashina Vremeni

Moral Code X

Murat Nasyrov (†)

Natali

Nepara

Premier-Minister

Smyslovye Gallyutsinatsii

Timati

Shura

Zivert

Khanna

Elena Sever

Joseph Kobzon (†)

Egor Kreed

Quest Pistols Show

Jeanna Friske (†)

Masha Rasputina

1 figurine:
A-Dessa

Alekseev

Agatha Christie

Alexander Golubev

Alexander Ivanov

Alexander Shevchenko

Alexey Vorobyov

Alexei Khvorostyan

Александр Яковлев

Алексин

Антон Макарский

Arash

Arsenie Todiraș

Assorti

Balagan Limited

Banda Andryukha

Bely Oryol

BiS

Bozhya Korovka

Bratya Grimm

BoomBox (Ukrainian band)

Vakhtang

Vostok

Virus

Vitas

Vyacheslav Petkun

Goryachiy Shokolad

Dasha Suvorova

2+2

23:45

Demo

Detsl

D.I.P. Project

DJ Tsvetkoff

Dominik Dzhoker

Duet Leto

Yelena Terleyeva

Zhenya Otradnaya

Zhuki

Zapreschennie barabanschiki

Konstantin Meladze

Igoryok

Igor Nikolayev

In2nation

Infiniti

Irina Saltykova

Leningrad

Litsey

Lyudmila Gurchenko (†)

Lyudmila Sokolova

MBAND

Maxim Leonidov

Martan

Megapolis

Mr.Credo

Moya Mishel

Mumiy Troll

Natalia Vlasova

Nikolai Trubach

Nilda Fernandez

Nensi

Oxana Fedorova

Propaganda

Patricia Kaas

Revolvers

Sati Kazanova

Sestri Rouz

Smash

Sveta

Slivki

Splean

Stuff

t.A.T.u.

Tatyana Likhacheva

Tatiana Ovsienko

Te100steron

TOKiO

Tutsi

Unesennie Vetrom

Freestyle

U-Piter

Yan Marti

Mot & Ani Lorak

Gradusy

Pizza

Igor Burnyshev

Marcel

Basta

Special Award for contribution in national music:
Yuri Malikov

Alexander Rosenbaum

Lev Leshchenko (2)

Valery Leontiev

Larisa Dolina

Yuri Antonov (2)

Eduard Khil (†)

Aleksander Serov

Yuri Nikolaev

Alexander Buinov

Vyacheslav Dobrynin (2)

Mashina Vremeni

Lyube

Zemlyane

Lyudmila Zykina (†)
