= Natasha Korolyova discography =

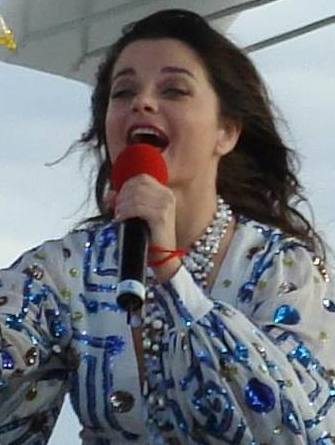
- Korolyova in Arkhangelsk in 2009
- Studio albums: 11
- Compilation albums: 16
- Singles: 41
- Video albums: 3

The discography of Russian singer Natasha Korolyova includes eleven studio albums, sixteen compilations, three video albums and forty-one singles.

== Albums ==
=== Studio albums ===
Title	Album details
Zhyoltyye tyulpany	Released: 1991; Label: Sintez Records, RiTonis; Formats: LP, CD, MC, digital download
Delfin i rusalka (with Igor Nikolayev)	Released: 1992; Label: ZeKo Records, Alrek; Formats: LP, CD, MC, digital download
Poklonnik	Released: May 1994; Label: ZeKo Records; Formats: CD, MC, digital download
Konfetti	Released: May 1995; Label: Soyuz; Formats: CD, MC, digital download
Brillianty slyoz	Released: December 1997; Label: Extraphone; Formats: CD, MC, digital download
Serdtse	Released: May 2001; Label: Monolit; Formats: CD, MC, digital download
Verish ili net (with Tarzan)	Released: 2003; Label: Monolit; Formats: CD, MC, digital download
Ray tam, gde ty...	Released: May 2006; Label: Kvadro-Disk; Formats: CD, MC, digital download
Magiya L...	Released: 1 March 2015; Label: –; Formats: CD, digital download
Yagodka	Released: 31 May 2019; Label: –; Formats: CD, digital download
20/21	Released: 17 December 2021; Label: Digital Project; Formats: CD, digital download

=== Compilations ===
Title	Album details
Taxi Taxi (with Igor Nikolayev)	Released: 1993 (Germany); Label: Igor Nikolaev Production, Konzert Agentur Michael Friedmann; Formats: CD
Samaya rodnaya (with Igor Nikolayev)	Released: 1999; Label: Igor Nikolaev Production; Formats: CD, digital download
Oskolki proshlogo	Released: 2002; Label: Monolit; Formats: CD, MC, digital download
Grand Collection	Released: 2009; Label: Kvadro-Disk; Formats: CD
Pesni Igorya Nikolayeva	Released: 2009; Label: Kvadro-Disk; Formats: CD
Luchshiye pesni	Released: 2009; Label: Vigma; Formats: CD
Dve zvezdy (with Igor Nikolayev)	Released: 2013; Label: Kvadro-Disk; Formats: CD
Neizdannoye	Released: 13 February 2020; Label: Digital Project; Formats: Digital download
Chut-cht ne schitayetsya	Released: 1 October 2020; Label: Digital Project; Formats: Digital download
Luchshiye pesni	Released: December 2021; Label: Digital Project; Formats: Digital download
Luchshiye khity	Released: 26 May 2023; Label: Digital Project; Formats: Digital download
Pod letnim dozhdyom	Released: 21 June 2023; Label: Digital Project; Formats: Digital download
Venetsianskaya osen	Released: 12 October 2023; Label: Digital Project; Formats: Digital download
Natasha Korolyova	Released: 2024; Label: Digital Project; Formats: Digital download
Muzyka yunosti	Released: 2024; Label: Digital Project; Formats: Digital download
Zhivi i ver v lyubov	Released: 2024; Label: Digital Project; Formats: Digital download

=== Video albums ===
Title	Album details
Konfetti	Released: 1996; Label: Soyuz; Formats: VHS
Delfin i rusalka (with Igor Nikolayev)	Released: 1997; Label: ZeKo Records; Formats: VHS
Grand Collection	Released: 2009; Label: Kvadro-Disk; Formats: DVD

== Singles ==
Title	Year	Peak chart positions			Album
Title	Year	CIS	RUS	UKR	Album
"Ne zabudu"	2003	—	—	—	Verish ili net
"Siniye lebyadi 2004"	2004	65	45	66	Non-album single
"Sirenevy ray"	2004	48	36	42	Ray tam, gde ty...
"Ray tam, gde ty..."	2005	76	—	40	Ray tam, gde ty...
"Nemyye kapli dozhdya"	2006	67	70	38	Ray tam, gde ty...
"Kristall mechty"	2006	99	114	36	Non-album singles
"Zhyoltyye tyulpany" (Remix)	2007	—	—	—	Non-album singles
"Na sinem more"	2007	106	112	76	Non-album singles
"Mama"	2008	—	199	176	Non-album singles
"V zale ozhidaniya"	2008	112	100	—	Non-album singles
"Nochnoy gorod"	2009	141	121	—	Non-album singles
"Ne ostavlyay menya"	2011	—	—	—	Non-album singles
"Toch-v-toch" (with Tarzan)	2011	—	—	—	Non-album singles
"Nebesa"	2012	—	—	—	Magiya L...
"Stoyala i plakala"	2013	—	—	—	Magiya L...
"Abrikosovyye sny"	2014	173	163	—	Magiya L...
"Porochen ya toboy" (with Aleksandr Marshal)	2014	49	39	—	Magiya L...
"Glavnaya lyubov"	2015	187	175	—	Magiya L...
"Net slova Ya"	2015	—	—	—	Magiya L...
"Ne govori Net"	2015	—	—	—	Magiya L...
"Ya ustala"	2016	111	99	—	Magiya L...
"Osen pod nogami"	2017	69	53	—	Yagodka
"Yesli my s toboy" (with German Titov)	2017	77	59	—	Yagodka
"Ded Moroz" (with German Titov)	2017	—	—	—	Yagodka
"Zyat"	2018	138	109	—	Yagodka
"Yagoda"	2018	—	—	—	Yagodka
"Petli-potselui"	2019	—	—	—	Yagodka
"Simvol yunosti"	2019	—	—	—	Yagodka
"Qylyqty qyz" (with Berkut)	2019	—	—	—	20/21
"Seryye glaza dvadtsat let spustya"	2019	—	—	—	Chut-cht ne schitayetsya
"Davai hulyai!"	2020	—	—	—	20/21
"Krasnaya pomada"	2020	—	—	—	20/21
"Gori, gori" (with Tarzan)	2020	—	—	—	20/21
"Delfin i rusalka" (with Arkhip Grek)	2021	—	—	—	20/21
"Synu"	2021	—	—	—	20/21
"Prostaya lyubov"	2022	—	—	—	Non-album singles
"Kogda ya stanu vetrom"	2022	—	—	—	Non-album singles
"Obnimu tebya schastyem"	2023	—	—	—	Non-album singles
"Tri tylpana"	2023	—	—	—	Non-album singles
"Oy, Natasha" (with Gazan)	2023	—	—	—	Non-album singles
"Tvoyo slovo patsana"	2024	—	—	—	Non-album singles
"—" denotes items which did not chart in that country.
