= Sex (Vintage album) =

SEX

Studio album by Vintage
- Released: October 14, 2009
- Recorded: 2008–2009
- Genre: Pop, electronics, trip hop
- Length: 50:35
- Label: Velvet Music; Moon Records Ukraine
- Producer: Alexander Sakharov; Alexey Romanov; Anna Pletnyova

Vintage chronology
| Criminal Love (2007) | SEX (2009) | Anechka (2011) |

Sex (stylized in all caps) is the second studio album by the Russian pop group Vintage, released in 2009. In addition to the regular edition of the album, which was released on October 14, 2009, there is also a collector's edition with an additional DVD.

== History ==
The album is a conceptual work, the main theme of which is sex. The disc received mostly positive reviews from critics, who noted the high quality of the recording and the well-realized concept of the album.

The disc was a moderate commercial success, debuting at No. 12 on the Russian Album Chart. In support of the album, a promotional campaign was organized, which included a presentation of the album in Moscow and a promo tour to the cities of the CIS. According to the band members, the album SEX is a musical and sexual encyclopedia where all possible types of love have found their place: venal, fleeting, homosexual.

The album was also nominated in the category Album of the Year at the 2010 Muz-TV Awards.

== Track listing ==
1. SEX – 5:07
2. Victoria – 3:56
3. On/Off – 2:54
4. Make Me Hurt – 4:13
5. Sleepwalking Girls – 4:11
6. Boy – 3:48
7. Eva – 4:11
8. Bad Girl (with Elena Korikova) – 3:35
9. Loneliness of Love – 3:57
10. You Are for Me – 3:37
11. Striptease – 3:53
12. Sex Dance – 2:58
13. XXL – 3:57

== Personnel ==
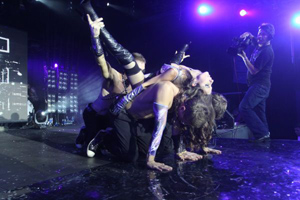
Anna Pletnyova at the presentation of the album

- Anna Pletnyova — sound production, vocals
- Alexey Romanov — music (tracks 1–3, 6–13), lyrics (tracks 4–6, 13), sound production, backing vocals
- Alexander Sakharov — music (tracks 4, 5), lyrics (tracks 1–3, 5–10, 12), arrangement, mixing, mastering, sound production
- Yuri Usachyov — music (track 7)
- Alexander Kovalyov — lyrics (tracks 6, 11)
- Ksenia Sakharova — lyrics (track 13)
- Eva Polna — lyrics (track 7)
- Elena Korikova — vocals (track 8)
- Yevgeny Kuritsyn — photo
