= Anna Pletnyova =

Russian singer, composer, and songwriter (born 1977)

Anna Pletnyova Анна Плетнёва
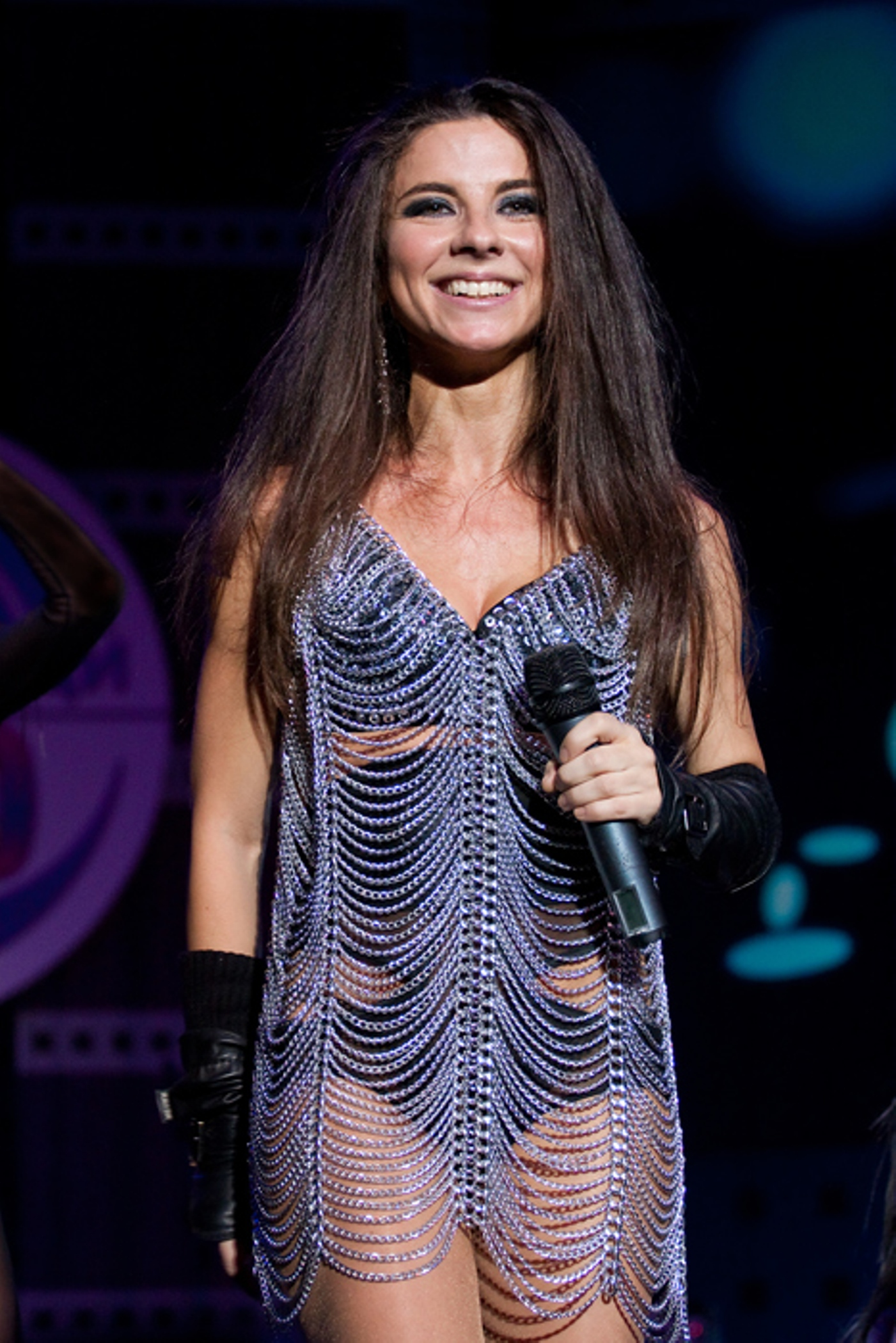

Background information
- Born: Anna Yuryevna Pletnyova; 21 August 1977 (age 49); Moscow, Russian SFSR, USSR
- Genres: Pop, electronic
- Occupations: Singer, composer, songwriter
- Years active: 1997–present

Anna Yuryevna Pletnyova (Russian: А́нна Ю́рьевна Плетнёва; born 21 August 1977) is a Russian singer, composer, and songwriter. An ex-member of the Russian pop-group Litsey (from 1997 to 2005), Pletnyova has been a member of the pop-group Vintage since 2006. In 2016, she left Vintage and started a solo career.

Pletnyova has been included several times in the "Top 100 Sexiest Women in the World" of the Russian edition of FHM, including rankings on the 7th place in both 2012 and 2014, as well as 8th place in 2015. Alongside her singing career, Pletnyova was the director of Russian TV series Kadetstvo (Кадетство) and Kremlyovskie kursanty (Кремлёвские курсанты).

== Discography ==
=== With Litsey ===
Albums

- "Живая коллекция" — 1998
- "Небо" — 1999
- "Ты стала другой" — 2000
- "Двери открой" — 2003
- "44 минуты" — 2005

Songs as lead vocalist

- "Больше, чем любить" (also songwriter)
- "Листья" (also composer and songwriter)
- "Люби и не теряй" (also composer and songwriter)
- "Плачь небо" (also songwriter)

=== With Vintage ===
Albums

- "Криминальная любовь" (CD; Velvet Music; 2007)
- "SEX" (CD; Velvet Music; 2009)
- "Анечка" (CD; Velvet Music; 2011)
- "Very Dance" (CD;Velvet Music; 2013)
- "Light (EP) Best of" (CD; Velvet Music; 2014)
- "Микки (EP) Best of" (CD; Velvet Music; 2014)
- "Decamerone" (CD; Velvet Music; 2014)
- "Винтаж. LIVE 1.0" (2015)

Singles

- Мама Мия" (radio airplay; Velvet Music; 2006)
- "10 поцелуев" (новогодняя версия; radio airplay; Velvet Music; 2006)
- "Мама Мия" (Radio Edit) — re-release (radio airplay; Velvet Music; 2007)
- "Целься" (radio airplay; Velvet Music; 2007)
- "Всего хорошего" (CD, radio airplay; Velvet Music; 2007)
- "Плохая девочка" (CD, radio airplay; Velvet Music; 2008)
- "Одиночество любви" (radio airplay; Velvet Music; August 2008)
- "Ева" (CD, radio airplay; Velvet Music; 2009)
- "Девочки-лунатики" (CD, radio airplay; Velvet Music; 2009)
- "Victoria" (radio airplay; Velvet Music; 2010)
- "Микки" (CD, Radio airplay; Velvet Music; April 2010)
- "Роман" (Radio airplay, September 2010)
- "Мама-Америка" (Radio airplay, February 2011)
- "Деревья" (Radio airplay, October 2011)
- "Москва" (Radio airplay; January 2012)
- "Нанана" (Radio airplay; May 2012)
- "Отпусти меня" (feat. Doстучаться Do Nебес; radio airplay; August 2012)
- "Танцуй в последний раз" (feat. Roma Kenga; promotional single; Radio airplay; October 2012)
- "Свежая вода" (Radio airplay; November 2012)
- "Знак Водолея" (Radio airplay; April 2013)
- "Три желания" (Radio airplay; October 2013)
- "Когда рядом ты" (Radio airplay; April 2014)
- "Дыши" (Radio airplay; January 2015)
- "Я верю в любовь" (Radio airplay; August 2015)
- "Город, где сбываются мечты" (Radio airplay; November 2015)
- "Сны" (OST"Сны"; январь 2016)
- "Немного рекламы" (Radio airplay; February 2016)

=== Solo ===
Albums

- Сильная Девочка (2018)
- Синематик (2019)

== Charts ==
=== Singles ===
Year	Title	Chart positions									Album
Year	Title	CIS (Tophit General Top-100)	Russia (Tophit Russian Top-100)	Russia (Tophit Moscow Top-100)	Russia (Tophit Saint Petersburg Top-100)	Ukraine (Tophit Kyiv Top-100)	CIS (Tophit yearly general)	Russia (2М. Топ 10. Digital tracks)	Russia (Red Star. Sales)	Russia & CIS (Tophit weekly on demand)	Album
2006	Мама Мия	37	—	77	—	—	184	—	—	226	Криминальная любовь
2007	Целься	18	—	37	—	—	149	—	—	24	Криминальная любовь
2007	Всего хорошего	14	—	27	—	—	108	—	—	23	Криминальная любовь
2008	Плохая девочка (with Elena Korikova)	1	—	6	9	2	13	—	—	1	SEX
2008	Одиночество любви	1	—	4	9	11	54 (2008)/74 (2009)	—	—	1	SEX
2009	Ева	1	—	1	1	11	2	—	—	1	SEX
2009	Девочки-лунатики	14	—	32	17	—	132	—	—	3	SEX
2009	Victoria	1	—	4	6	3	38	—	—	6	SEX
2010	Микки	25	—	35	36	—	192	—	49	28	Анечка
2010	Роман	3	9	6	11	8	60	8	18	2	Анечка
2011	Мама-Америка	16	14	19	27	22	49	—	19	5	Анечка
2011	Деревья	13	13	19	18	38	149	9	13	4	Анечка
2012	Москва (with DJ Smash)	1	1	2	1	—	8	—	35	17	Very Dance
2012	Нанана (with Bobina)	114	—	—	—	—	—	—	78		Very Dance
2012	Свежая вода (with ChinKong)	3	5	7	6	92	94	20	—	31	Very Dance
2013	Знак водолея	1	2	5	2	1	4	3	1	1	Decameronе
2013	Три желания (with DJ Smash)	33	29	43	40	—	—	—	—	5	Decameronе
2014	Когда рядом ты	1	1	2	4	27	6	—	—	1	Decameronе
2015	Дыши	2	2	13	6	–	—	—	—	1	Сильная девочка
2015	Я верю в любовь (feat. DJ M.E.G. & N.E.R.A.K.)	8	11	20	16	—	—	—	—	4	Сильная девочка
2016	Немного рекламы (feat. Clan Soprano)	16	13	23	27	—	—	—	—	5	Сильная девочка
2016	Сильная девочка	9	11	–	–	—	—	—	—	–	Сильная девочка
2017	Подруга	156	258	–	–	–	—	—	—	–	non-album
2017	На чьей ты стороне?	36	42	–	–	–	—	—	—	–	Сильная девочка
2017	Игрушки	–	130	–	–	–	—	—	—	–	non-album
2017	Лалалэнд	152	206	–	–	–	—	—	—	–	non-album
2018	Белая	22	17	–	–	–	—	—	—	–	Сильная девочка
2018	Воскресный ангел	85	57	–	–	–	—	—	—	–	Сильная девочка
2018	Огромное сердце	–	–	–	–	–	—	—	—	–	Синематик
2019	В мире животных	875	650	–	–	–	—	—	—	–	Синематик
2019	Интуиция	72	62	–	–	–	—	—	—	–	Синематик
2019	Преступление и наказание	190	180	–	–	–	—	—	—	–	Навсегда
2019	Кометы	359	230	–	–	–	—	—	—	–	non-album
2020	Девочкамания	–	–	–	–	–	—	—	—	–	non-album
2020	Аэропорты (with Slider & Magnit)	462	312	–	–	–	—	—	—	–	non-album
2020	Песенка панды и попугая (Мир обнять) (with Влад Топалов)	355	396	–	–	–	—	—	—	–	non-album
2020	Из Токио	–	–	–	–	–	—	—	—	–	Навсегда
2020	Новая Жизнь	42	27	–	–	–	—	—	—	–	TBA

Key: "«—" did not charted

Note: From 1 January 2011, TopHit General chart was divided into: Russian Top-100 and Ukrainian Top-100. Until 2011, there are no positions for Russian Top-100, because the chart was not formed yet at that time. The best position for song «Роман» is shown only for 2011.

Note: "2М" chart was compiled once in two weeks on the basis of the certified sales of songs in internet markets, mobile services, and based on streaming (free audition) of the track in Russia.

Note: «Red Star» sales chart was compiled monthly only for Russian-language songs. It was based on data received from the Russian version of Billboard magazine and included digital sales, but also sales of album tracks.

=== Promotional singles ===
Year	Title	Chart positions
Year	Title	CIS (Tophit General Top-100)
2006	"10 поцелуев»	66
2012	"Танцуй в последний раз»	—
2013	"Play»	—

=== Other songs in charts ===
Year	Title	Chart positions		Album
Year	Title	Russia ("Red Star". Sales)	Russia ("Red Star". Total)	Album
2011	"Стерео»	13	100	"Анечка»
2011	"Ave Maria»	48	—	"Анечка»
2011	"Амстердам" (with Vladimir Presnyakov)	47	—	"Анечка»
2011	"Запретный мир»	46	—	"Анечка»
2011	"XXI век»	50	—	"Анечка»
2014	"Инфанта»	—	91	Decamerone

Key: «—" did not charted

Note: «Red Star» sales chart was compiled monthly only for Russian-language songs. It was based on data received from the Russian version of Billboard magazine and included digital sales, but also sales of album tracks.

== Videos ==
=== As Vintage ===
- 2006 — "Мама Мiа»
- 2007 — "Целься"
- 2007 — "Всего хорошего»
- 2008 — "Плохая девочка" with Elena Korikova
- 2008 — "Одиночество любви»
- 2009 — "Ева»
- 2009 — "Девочки-лунатики»
- 2009 — "Виктория»
- 2010 — "Микки»
- 2010 — "Роман»
- 2011 — "Мама-Америка»
- 2011 — "Мальчик»
- 2011 — "Деревья"
- 2012 — "Москва" with DJ Smash
- 2012 — "Нанана»
- 2012 — "Танцуй в последний раз" with Roma Kenga
- 2012 — "Свежая вода»
- 2013 — "Play»
- 2013 — "Знак водолея»
- 2013 — "Три желания" with DJ Smash
- 2014 — "Когда рядом ты»
- 2015 — "Дыши»
- 2015 — "Я верю в в любовь" with DJ M.E.G.
- 2015 — "Город, где сбываются мечты" with DJ Smash
- 2016 — "Сны»
- 2016 — "Немного рекламы" (feat. Clan Soprano)
- 2020 — "Из Токио"

=== As Anna Pletnyova ===
- 2016 — "Сильная девочка"
- 2017 — "Подруга"
- 2017 — "На чьей ты стороне?"
- 2017 — "Игрушки"
- 2017 — "Лалалэнд"
- 2018 — "Белая"
- 2018 — "Воскресный ангел"
- 2019 — "Интуиция"
- 2019 — "Преступление и наказание"
