= The Aristocratic Peasant Girl =

- Russian poster
- Russian: Барышня-крестьянка
- Directed by: Aleksey Sakharov
- Written by: Alexander Pushkin (novel); Alexander Zhitinsky; Aleksey Sakharov
- Produced by: Lyudmila Pozharskaya
- Starring: Elena Korikova; Dmitriy Shcherbina; Leonid Kuravlyov; Vasily Lanovoy; Yekaterina Rednikova
- Cinematography: Nikolay Nemolyaev
- Edited by: Antonina Zimina
- Music by: Vladimir Komarov
- Production company: Mosfilm
- Release date: 1995
- Running time: 112 minutes
- Country: Russia
- Language: Russian

The Aristocratic Peasant Girl (Russian: Барышня-крестьянка, romanized: Baryshnya-krestyanka) is a 1995 Russian romantic drama film directed by Aleksey Sakharov. It is loosely based on a tale with the same name from Pushkin's The Belkin Tales.

== Plot ==
Pomeshchik Muromsky's daughter Lisa wants to meet Aleksey, the son of a neighbor pomeshchik, but this is prevented by the feud between their parents. Lisa finds out that Aleksey loves morning walks in the woods, and early in the morning sets off in search of him disguised as a peasant girl.

== Cast ==
- Elena Korikova as Elizaveta Muromskaya
- Dmitriy Shcherbina as Alexey Berestov
- Leonid Kuravlyov as Grigory Muromsky
- Vasily Lanovoy as Ivan Berestov
- Yekaterina Rednikova as Nastya
- Lyudmila Artemyeva as miss Jackson
- Evgeny Zharikov as Roschin
- Natalya Gvozdikova as Roschina
- Vadim Zakharchenko as a servant
- Ariadna Shengelaya as Arina Petrovna
- Raisa Ryazanova as Anisya Egorovna

== See also ==
- Miss Peasant (Барышня - крестьянка), a 1916 lost film by Olga Preobrazhenskaya and Vladimir Gardin
