= Sergei Glushko =

Russian actor, singer and fitness model (born 1970)

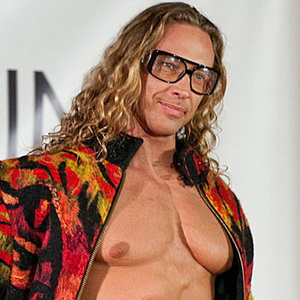
- Born: Sergei Vitalievich Glushko; 8 March 1970 (age 56); Mirny, Arkhangelsk Oblast, Russian SFSR, Soviet Union (now Russia)
- Occupations: Singer, actor, striptease dancer, fitness model, fitness-trainer, businessman

Sergei Vitalievich Glushko (Russian: Сергей Витальевич Глушко; born 8 March 1970) is a Russian actor, singer and fitness model, known in the countries of the former USSR as a striptease dancer under the pseudonym of Tarzan and as the husband of Natasha Korolyova. He is the founder and creator of the first-ever male revue "Tarzan Dance Show" in Russia, which performs in Moscow, and tours all around the world. The show is a 60-minute interactive performance with choreographed dances, amazing music, costumes and lights. Their main competitor is Chippendales.

== Biography ==
Sergei Glushko was born and raised in Mirny, Arkhangelsk Oblast, Russian SFSR, Soviet Union into a mixed Ukrainian-Belarusian family. After completing his training at A.F. Mozhaysky's Military-Space Academy, Sergei worked as an engineer at the Plesetsk Cosmodrome for a year. Between 1992 and 1995 he was married to servicewoman Elena Perevedentseva.

In the mid-1990s, he moved to Moscow and began his modeling career and appeared in several music videos, including Because one can not be so beautiful by the band Bely Oryol. Sergei acted in the Presnyakov brothers play "Flooring" and later got an offer to become a stripper. After five years of work, famous artists began to invite him to perform with them. His first appearance in film was an uncredited role in 8 ½ $. Afterwards, he studied theater at the Russian Academy of Theatre Arts.

Sergei Glushko became romantically involved with the well-known Russian singer Natasha Korolyova in 2001. Their relationship received widespread coverage in Russian media. He married Natasha in 2003 and their son Arkhip was born in 2002.

In 2009, Sergei released the book Cult of Body in which he shares his advice on fitness and nutrition.

Glushko was listed on Myrotvorets in 2017 for "deliberate violation of the state border of Ukraine" – he was a member of the jury of the beauty contest "Pearl of the Black Sea-2017", which was held in Sevastopol in July.

== Selected filmography ==
- 8 ½ $ (uncredited)
- My Fair Nanny (cameo)
- Happy Together as Ruslan
- Kingdom of Crooked Mirrors (cameo)
- Univer (cameo)
- Night Shift as Zhenya "King Kong"
- Moscow Gigolo as Sergey Vitalievich
