= Vintage (band) =

Russian pop group

Vintage Винтаж
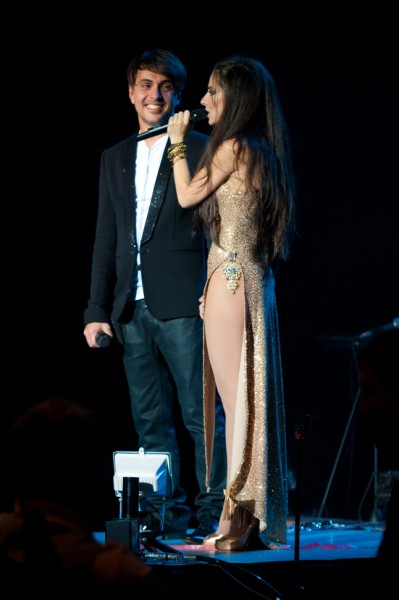

Background information
- Origin: Moscow, Russia
- Genres: Pop, electronic dance music
- Years active: 2006– present
- Label: Velvet Music
- Members: Anna Pletnyova (2006-2016;2018-present); Alexey Romanov (2006-2016;2018-present)
- Past members: Mia (2006—2008); Svetlana Ivanova (2008—2011); Yevgenia Polikarpova (2016-2017); Anna Kornilova (2016-2017); Anastasia Kreskina (2016-2017); Anastasia Kazaku (2016-2017)
- Website: www.vintagemusic.ru

Vintage (Russian: Винтаж, romanized: Vintazh) is a Russian pop group formed in 2006 by the singer Anna Pletnyova and musician Alexey Romanof.

They have released 5 albums and sixteen radio singles, six of which headed the Russian radio-charts.

The group is a laureate and nominee of a number of musical awards, including MTV Russia Music Awards, Muz-TV Award, Golden Gramophone Award, RU.TV Award and others. Since 2008 Vintage is a steady laureate of Song of the Year award. In 2011 and 2012 it was named the best group of the year at ZD Awards based on a poll organised by Moskovskij Komsomolets.

== History ==
=== 2006 - 2007 Career Beginnings and first album ===
Vintage was formed by ex-soloist of "High School" Anna Pletneva and former soloist of group "A-Mega" Alexei Romanov in mid 2006. Originally, they were going to name the band "Chelsea" but later changed it to "Vintage".

=== 2007: the first album ===
In late August, the group filmed the video for the song "Good-bye". On November 22 they released their first album, called "Криминальная любовь" ("Criminal Love").

=== 2008 ===
On April 19 the video for new song of "Bad Girl" was released, a duet with actor Elena Korikova. In October, there was a change in the group; Mia exits the band and Svetlana Ivanova replaced her.

=== 2009 ===
In February, the group went on tour, visiting cities such as Moscow, Ulyanovsk, Riga, Minsk, Samara and Kaliningrad. On March 15 they released a new video for the song "Eva". This song was dedicated to singer Eva Polna.

On 31 August 2009, they released their fourth single from their forthcoming album "Lunatic Girls".

In October they released their second album "SEX". The record debuted at number 12 in the Russian album chart.

=== 2010–2011 ===
While Vintage played live on Love Radio on April 16, they introduced a new single titled "(Russian: Микки" ("Mikki"), which is dedicated to Michael Jackson. The band shot two versions of the video clip for the song; a Russian version and English translation.

On September 11, Европа плюс (Europe Plus), Русское радио (Russkoe radio), Love-радио (Love-radio) and Свежее радио (Svezhee radio) released Vintage's latest song, "Роман" ("Roman"). The followup single "Derevya", ("Trees") was released in late 2011, followed by their third studio album "Anechka" ("Anny").

== Band members ==
Current

- Anna Pletnyova (2006-2016 + 2018–present; Russian: Анна Плетнёва)
- Alexey Romanof (2006-2017 + 2018–present; Russian: Алексей Романоф)

Former

- Mia (2006–2008; Russian: Мия)
- Svetlana Ivanova (2008–2011; Russian: Светлана Иванова)
- Yevgenia Polikarpova (2016-2017;Russian: Евгения Поликарпова)
- Anna Kornilova (2016-2017;Russian: Анна Корнилова)
- Anastasia Kreskina (2016-2017;Russian: Анастасия Крескина)
- Anastasia Kazaku (2016-2017;Russian: Анастасия Казаку)

== Discography ==
=== Studio albums ===
- «Криминальная любовь/Kriminaĺnaja lübov'» "Criminal Love" (CD; Velvet Music; 2007 )
- «SEX» (CD; Velvet Music; 2009 )
- «Анечка/Anečka» "Anny" (CD; Velvet Music; 2011)
- «Very Dance» (CD; Velvet Music; 2013)
- «Decamerone» (CD; Velvet Music; 2014)
- Навсегда/Forever (2020)

=== Singles ===
- «Mamma Mia» (radio airplay; Velvet Music; 2006)
- «10 поцелуев/10 pocelujev (новогодняя версия)» "10 Kisses (Christmas Version)" (radio airplay; Velvet Music; 2006)
- «Мама Мия (Radio Edit)» "Mama Mia (Radio Edit)" (radio airplay; Velvet Music; 2007)
- «Целься/Ceĺsä» "Aim" (radio airplay; Velvet Music; 2007)
- «Всего хорошего/Vsego horošego» "All the best" (CD, radio airplay; Velvet Music; 2007)
- «Плохая девочка/Plohaja devočka» "Bad girl" (CD, radio airplay; Velvet Music; 2008)
- «Одиночество любви/Odinočestvo lübvi» "Loneliness of Love" (radio airplay; Velvet Music; 2008)
- «Ева/Eva» "Eve" (CD, radio airplay; Velvet Music; 2009)
- «Девочки-лунатики/Devočki-lunatiki» "Lunatic Girls" (CD, radio airplay; Velvet Music; 2009)
- «Victoria» (Radio airplay, 2009)
- «Микки/Mikki» "Mickey" (CD, Radio airplay; Velvet Music; 2010)
- «Роман/Roman» "Roman" (CD, Radio airplay; Velvet Music; 2010)
- «С Новым Годом/S novym godom» "Happy new year" (with Irakli, Vladimir Plesnyakov, A-Studio, Nyusha, Aleksey Chumakov, Yulia Kovalchuk) (2010)
- «Мама Америка/Mama-Amerika» "Mama America" (2011)
- «Деревья/Derevja» "Trees" (2011)
- «Москва/Moskva» "Moscow" (2012)
- «Нанана/Nanana» "Nanana" (2012)
- «Свежая вода/Svežaja voda» "Fresh water" (2012)
- «Знак Водолея/Znak Vodoleja» "The sign of Aquarius" (2013)
- «Когда Рядом Ты/Kogda rädom ty» "When I'm next to you" (2014)
- «Дыши/Dyši» "Breathe" (2015)
- «Я верю в в любовь/Ja verü v lübov'» "I Believe In Love" (2015)
- «Город, где сбываются мечты/Gorod, gde sbyvajutsä mečty» "A city where dreams come true" (2015)
- «Сны/Sny» "Dreams" (2016)
- «Немного рекламы/Nemnogo reklamy» "A Little Advertising" (2016)
- «Из Токио/Iz Tokio» "From Tokyo" (2020)
- «Новая Жизнь/Novaja žizń» "New Life" (2020)
