= Three Sisters (1994 film) =

1994 film by Sergei Solovyov

- Directed by: Sergei Solovyov
- Written by: Anton Chekhov; Sergei Solovyov
- Produced by: Alexander Buchman; Natan Fyodorsky
- Starring: Olga Belyayeva; Kseniya Kachalina; Elena Korikova
- Cinematography: Yuri Klimenko
- Music by: Sergey Kuryokhin
- Release date: 1994
- Running time: 106 minutes
- Countries: Germany; Russia
- Language: Russian

Three Sisters (Russian: Три сестры, Tri sestry) is a 1994 Russian film, based on Anton Chekhov's 1901 play of the same name. The movie was very successful in the former countries of the USSR and had one Nika Award nomination for the best cinematographer.

== Plot ==
In a small Russian town at the turn of the century, three sisters (Olga, Irina, and Masha) and their brother Andrei live but dream daily of their return to their former home in Moscow, where life is charming and stimulating meaningful. But for now they exist in a malaise of dissatisfaction. Soldiers from the local military post provide them some companionship and society, but nothing can suffice to replace Moscow in their hopes. Andrei marries a provincial girl, Natasha, and begins to settle into a life of much less meaning than he had hoped. Natasha begins to run the family her way. Masha, though married, yearns for the sophisticated life and begins a dalliance with Vershinin, an army officer with a sick and suicidal wife. Even Irina, the freshest, most optimistic of the sisters, begins to waver in her dreams until, finally, tragedy strikes.

== Cast ==
- Olga Belyayeva as Olga
- Kseniya Kachalina as Irina
- Elena Korikova as Masha
- Sergei Agapitov as Andrei
- Galina Dyomina
- Roman Falchenko
- Gennadi Ivanov
- Stanislav Korolkov
- Mikhail Krylov
- Maksim Masaltsev
- Mikhail Petukhov
- Dmitri Roshchin
- Otto Sander as Vershinin
- Mariya Surova
- Vitaliy Versace

== Awards and nominations ==
- Nika Awards (1994)
  - The Best Cinematographer (Yuri Klimenko) - Nominated
