= Litsey =

Russian girl group

Litsey Лицей
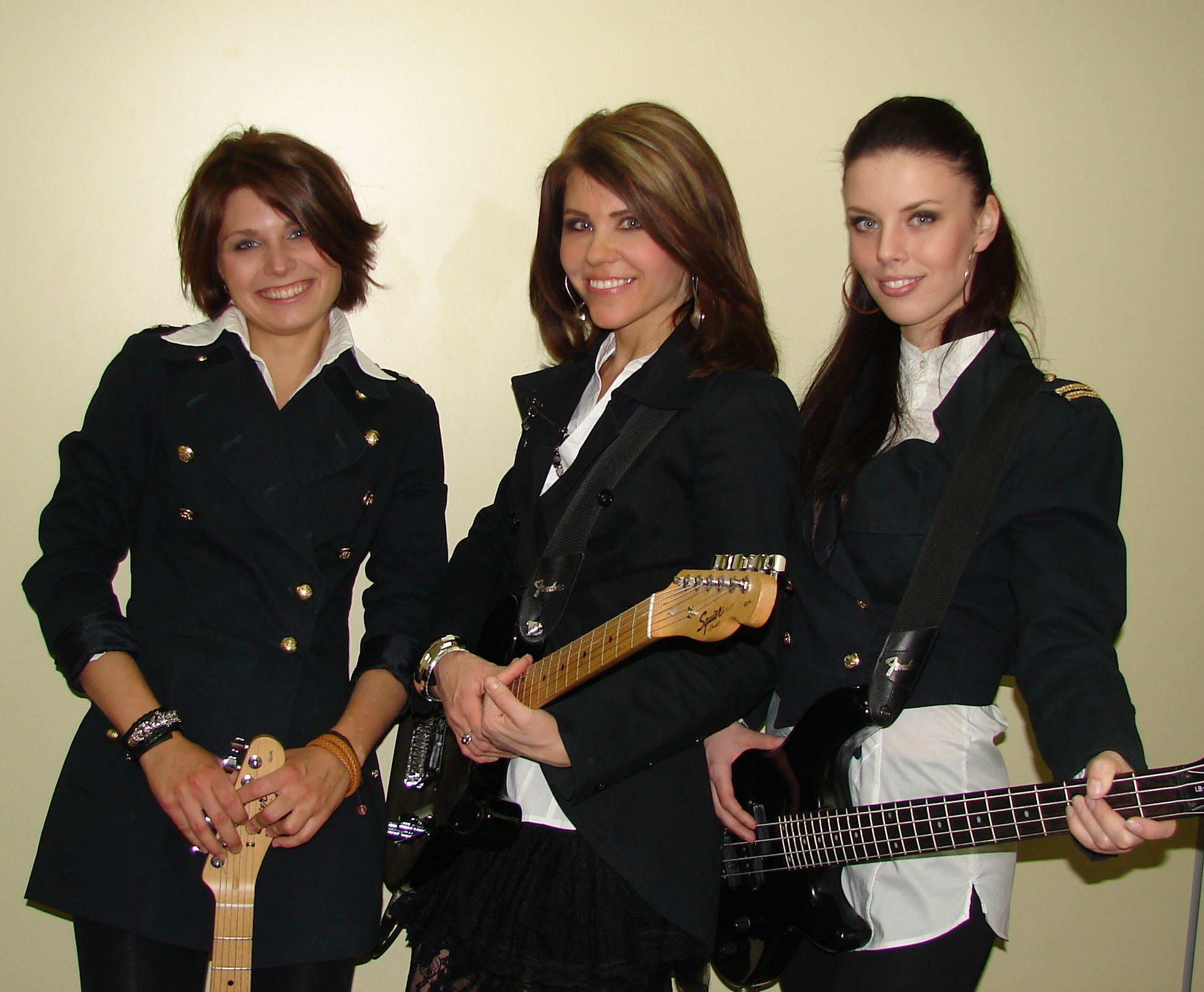
- Litsey in 2013

Background information
- Origin: Moscow, Russia
- Genre: Pop rock
- Years active: 1991–present
- Members: Anastasiya Makarevich; Sofia Taikh; Anna Shchegoleva
- Past members: Elena Perova; Isolda Ishkhanishvili; Svetlana Belyaeva; Anna Pletnyova; Elena Iksanova; Anastasiya Berezovskaya
- Website: licey-group.ru

Litsey (Russian: Лицей; Lyceum in English) is a Russian pop rock girl group from Moscow, formed on 12 December 1991. The original band's imagery – teen female trio with guitars – was unusual in post-Soviet Russia. While the band line-up was changed several times, vocalist Anastasiya Makarevich has remained the unchanged member of the group since its inception. The band is best known for the songs "Osen'" (Осень; Autumn) and "Kak ty o nyom mechtala" (Как ты о нём мечтала; How You Have Dreamed of Him). Original trio debuted in 1991 with АВВА's song "One of Us" on the TV show Morning Star (Утренняя звезда).

As of 2016, Litsey is Anastasiya Makarevich, Sofia Taikh, and Anna Shchegoleva. The group producer was Alexey Makarevich. Since the beginnings, Makarevich is the only unchanged band member. Also, the project was focused on her as lead figure, and she is the step-daughter of the producer Alexey Makarevich.

== Line-up ==
Years	Members		
1991 — 1997	Anastasiya Makarevich (Анастасия Макаревич)	Isolda Ishkhanishvili (Изольда Ишханишвили)	Elena Perova (Елена Перова)
1997 — 2001	Anastasiya Makarevich (Анастасия Макаревич)	Isolda Ishkhanishvili (Изольда Ишханишвили)	Anna Pletnyova (Анна Плетнёва)
2001 — 2002	Anastasiya Makarevich (Анастасия Макаревич)	Svetlana Belyaeva (Светлана Беляева)	Anna Pletnyova (Анна Плетнёва)
2002 — 2005	Anastasiya Makarevich (Анастасия Макаревич)	Sofia Taikh (София Тайх)	Anna Pletnyova (Анна Плетнёва)
2005 — 2007	Anastasiya Makarevich (Анастасия Макаревич)	Sofia Taikh (София Тайх)	Elena Iksanova (Елена Иксанова)
2007 — 2007	Anastasiya Makarevich (Анастасия Макаревич)	Sofia Taikh (София Тайх)	Anastasiya Berezovskaya (Анастасия Березовская)
2007 — 2011	Anastasiya Makarevich (Анастасия Макаревич)	Anna Shchegoleva (Анна Щёголева)	Anastasiya Berezovskaya (Анастасия Березовская)
2011 — present	Anastasiya Makarevich (Анастасия Макаревич)	Anna Shchegoleva (Анна Щёголева)	Sofia Taikh (София Тайх)

== Discography ==
- «Домашний арест» — 1992

Track-listing

№	Title	Composer	Writer
1	«Субботний вечер»	Ал. Макаревич	С. Андреев
2	«Домашний арест»	Ал. Макаревич	К. Кавалерян, Ан. Макаревич
3	«Снилось мне»	А. Романов	
4	«Высокий блондин»	В. Овсянников	
5	«Люди-машины»	В. Овсянников	
6	«Мама»	Ал. Макаревич	К. Кавалерян
7	«Стать самим собой»	А. Романов	А. Романов
8	«Good guy»	Е. Маргулис	А. Романов
9	«След на воде»	Ал. Макаревич	К. Кавалерян
10	«Будь здоров»	Ал. Макаревич	К. Кавалерян

- «Подруга — ночь» — 1994

Track-listing

№	Title	Composer	Writer
1	«Подруга — ночь»	Ал. Макаревич	К. Кавалерян
2	«Там, где нас нет»	Ал. Макаревич	К. Кавалерян
3	«Твоё право»	Ал. Макаревич	К. Кавалерян
4	«Кто остановит дождь»	Ал. Макаревич	К. Кавалерян
5	«Деньги»	Ал. Макаревич	К. Кавалерян
6	«Вниз по течению»	Ал. Макаревич	К. Кавалерян
7	«Another Paradise»	Ал. Макаревич	К. Кавалерян
8	«25»	Ал. Макаревич	К. Кавалерян
9	«Мой человек»	Ал. Макаревич	К. Кавалерян
10	«Бег по кругу»	Ал. Макаревич	К. Кавалерян

- «Открытый занавес» — 1996

Track-listing

№	Title	Composer	Writer
1	«Осень»	Ал. Макаревич	
2	«Я спешу за любовью»	Ал. Макаревич	
3	«Душа»	Ал. Макаревич	
4	«Смех сквозь слёзы»	Ал. Макаревич	
5	«Красная помада»	Ал. Макаревич	
6	«Отпусти меня на волю»	Ал. Макаревич	
7	«Нарисуй на небе птицу»	Ал. Макаревич	
8	«Я не вижу смысла»	Ал. Макаревич	
9	«В цветущий край»	Ал. Макаревич	
10	«У бродячих музыкантов»	Ал. Макаревич	

- «Паровозик-облачко» — 1997

Track-listing

№	Title	Composer	Writer
1	«Паровозик-облачко»	Ал. Макаревич	А. Морсин
2	«Было и прошло»	Ал. Макаревич	А. Морсин, Ал. Макаревич
3	«Расставание»	Ал. Макаревич, С. Сысоев	А. Морсин
4	«Девушка-зима»	Ал. Макаревич	А. Морсин
5	«Новогодняя»	Ал. Макаревич	В. Хлебников
6	«Незнакомка»	Ал. Макаревич	А. Морсин
7	«Моя любовь»	Ал. Макаревич	А. Морсин
8	«Спой мне»	Ал. Макаревич	А. Морсин
9	«Мне на память»	А. Баранова	М. Самошин
10	«В апельсиновом раю»	Ал. Макаревич	К. Кавалерян

- «Для тебя» — (Live-концерт в ГЦКЗ «Россия») — 1997

Track-listing

№	Title
1	«Субботний вечер»
2	«Стать самим собой»
3	«В цветущий край»
4	«Отпусти меня на волю»
5	«Подруга — ночь»
6	«Деньги»
7	«Я не вижу смысла»
8	«Мама»
9	«След на воде»
10	«Душа»
11	«Девушка-зима»
12	«Good guy»
13	«Было и прошло»
14	«Мне на память»
15	«Домашний арест»
16	«Моя любовь»
17	«Осень»

- «Живая коллекция» (Live концерт в телепрограмме «Живая коллекция») — 1998

Track-listing

№	Title
1	«Незнакомка»
2	«Красная помада»
3	«Расставание»
4	«Паровозик-облачко»
5	«След на воде»
6	«Стать самим собой»
7	«Another Paradise»
8	«Деньги»
9	«В апельсиновом раю»
10	«Good guy»
11	«Осень»

- «Небо» — 1999

Track-listing

№	Title	Composer	Writer
1	«Звезда»	Ал. Макаревич	А. Морсин
2	«Радуюсь»	А. Романов	
3	«Ветер»	А. Морсин	А. Морсин
4	«Небо»	Ал. Макаревич	А. Морсин
5	«Дороги наши разошлись»	Е. Маргулис	А. Романов
6	«Рыжий пёс»	Л. Варданян	
7	«Балерина грёз»	И. Каменской, Ал. Макаревич	А. Морсин
8	«Ты и я»	Ал. Макаревич	А. Морсин
9	«Куда тебя несёт»	Ал. Макаревич	А. Морсин
10	«Девочка с восточными глазами»	Ал. Макаревич	Ал. Макаревич

- «Ты стала другой» — 2000

Track-listing

№	Title	Composer	Writer
1	«Тебя здесь нет»	Анастасия Макаревич	
2	«Листья»	Ал. Макаревич, Анна Плетнева	Анна Плетнева
3	«Какая долгая зима»	Ал. Макаревич	И. Сибиряков
4	«Ты стала другой»	Ал. Макаревич	А. Морсин
5	«Планета-5»	А. Морсин	А. Морсин
6	«Лей, дождь»	С. Долгополов	
7	«Куда течёт река»	С. Долгополов	
8	«Мне всё равно»	Анастасия Макаревич	
9	«Больше, чем любить»	Ал. Макаревич	Анна Плетнева, Ю. Дементьев
10	«Сентенция»	Ал. Макаревич	А. Бутузов

- «44 минуты» — 2005

Track-listing

№	Title	Composer	Writer
1	«Она не верит больше в любовь»	Ал. Макаревич	Н. Тимченко
2	«Ты станешь взрослой»	В. Тюрин	Н. Тимченко
3	«Двери открой»	Ал. Макаревич	Н. Тимченко
4	«Облака»	Ал. Макаревич	Н. Тимченко
5	«Надо мной»	В. Молчанов	В. Саповский
6	«Какая долгая зима (mix)»	Ал. Макаревич	И. Сибиряков
7	«Белой пылью ночь»	А. Прусов	
8	«Люби и не теряй»	Ал. Макаревич	Анна Плетнева
9	«Спой мне»	Ал. Макаревич	А. Морсин
10	«Улетаешь в небо»	А. Прусов	
11	«Падает дождь»	Ал. Макаревич	Н. Тимченко
12	«Как ты о нём мечтала»	В. Тюрин	Н. Тимченко

- «Grand collection» — 2008

Track-listing

№	Title
1	«Осень»
2	«Домашний арест»
3	«Ты стала взрослой»
4	«Good guy»
5	«Девушка-зима»
6	«След на воде»
7	«Субботний вечер»
8	«Небо»
9	«Двери открой»
10	«Падает дождь»
11	«Как ты о нём мечтала»
12	«Она не верит больше в любовь»
13	«Люби его»
14	«Планета пять»
15	«Паровозик-облачко»
16	«Ты стала другой»
17	«Ты будешь с ним»
18	«В апельсиновом раю»
19	«Расставание»
20	«Звезда»

== Music videos ==
- «Подруга ночь» (1995)
- «Красная помада» (1996)
- «Осень» (1996)
- «Три сестры» (с Васей Богатырёвым) (1996)
- «Паровозик-облачко» (1997)
- «Расставание» (1997)
- «Москвичи» (с Л.Лещенко) (1997)
- «Солнце скрылось за горою» (1998)
- «День Победы» (с Л.Лещенко) (1998)
- «Небо» (1999)
- «Рыжий пёс» (1999)
- «Новый год» (Все звезды) (2000)
- «Ты стала другой» (2000)
- «Лолита» (в клипе Виктора Зинчука) (2000)
- «Планета пять» (2000)
- «Лей, дождь» (2001)
- «Улетаешь в небо» (2001)
- «Ты станешь взрослой» (2002)
- «Двери открой» (2004)
- «Фотография» (2015)

== Awards ==
- 1994 — "Silver microphone" at «Хит-парад Останкино» contest
- 1994 — "Musical examen" — Best band of 1994 (Saint Petersburg)
- 1995 — "Ovation" («Овация») award in category "Breakthrough of the year"
- Laureate of the festival Pesnya goda:
  «Pesnya goda 1993» — «Хороший парень»
  «Pesnya goda 1994» — «Домашний арест»
  «Pesnya goda 1998» — «Незнакомка»
  «Pesnya goda 2002» — «Ты станешь взрослой»
  «Pesnya goda 2003» — «Как ты о нём мечтала»
  «Pesnya goda 2003» — «Падает дождь»
  «Pesnya goda 2004» — «Двери открой»
  «Pesnya goda 2005» — «Облака»
- Laureate of Golden Gramophone Award:
  1996 — «Осень»
- 1996 — group album «Открытый занавес» reached top 10 of best-sold CDs of Soyuz recording company («СОЮЗ»).
- May 1996 — Song «Осень» was awarded with "100% hit" («Стопроцентный хит») by the magazine "Alla" («Алла»).
