= Propaganda (Russian band) =

Russian pop music group

Propaganda Пропаганда
- Origin: Moscow, Russia
- Genres: Pop, pop rock, synthpop
- Years active: 2001–present
- Labels: CD-LAND records Rise-Music; Продюсерский центр "Пропаганда"
- Members: Angelina Gridchina; Sofia Yeremchenko; Daria Sanakova
- Past members: Viktoria Voronina (2001—2010); Viktoria Petrenko (2001—2002); Yulia Garanina (2001—2002); Olga Moreva (2002—2007); Ekaterina Oleinikova (2002—2003); Irina Yakovleva (2003—2009); Natalia Korshunova (2003); Daria Gavrilchuk (2004—2007); Maria Bucatari (2007—2015); Anastasia Shevchenko (2009—2015); Viktoria Bogoslavskaya (2012); Maria Nedelkova (2012); Arina Milan (2015—2020); Veronika Kononenko (2015—2017); Maya Podolskaya (2015—2020); Kristina Krivyuk (2017—2018); Elena Shishkina (2018—2020)
- Website: www.probkistars.net

Propaganda (Russian: Пропаганда) is a Russian pop music group formed in 2001. During its career, the band released many singles, among them several becoming hits in Russia: "Melom" ("Мелом"), "Tak i byt" ("Так и быть"), "5 minut na liubov" ("5 минут на любовь"), "Yay-ya" ("Яй-я"), "Super Detka" ("Супер-Детка"), "Quanto Costa", "Znaesh'" ("Знаешь"), and "Podruga" ("Подруга").

== Members ==
Period	Line-up				
September 2001 – August 2002	Viktoria Voronina	Viktoria Petrenko	Yulia Garanina	—	—
August 2002 – August 2003	Viktoria Voronina	Olga Moreva	Ekaterina Oleinikova	—	—
August 2003 – November 2003	Viktoria Voronina	Olga Moreva	Ekaterina Oleinikova	Irina Yakovleva	Natalia Korshunova
November 2003 – August 2004	Viktoria Voronina	Olga Moreva	Irina Yakovleva	—	—
August 2004 – January 2007	Viktoria Voronina	Olga Moreva	Irina Yakovleva	Daria Gavrilchuk	—
January 2007 – March 2007	Viktoria Voronina	Maria Bucatari	Irina Yakovleva	Daria Gavrilchuk	—
March 2007 – June 2009	Viktoria Voronina	Maria Bucatari	Irina Yakovleva	—	—
June 2009 – July 2009	Viktoria Voronina	Maria Bucatari	—	—	—
July 2009 – December 2010	Viktoria Voronina	Maria Bucatari	Anastasia Shevchenko	—	—
December 2010 – February 2012	Anastasia Shevchenko	Maria Bucatari	—	—	—
February 2012 – April 2012	Anastasia Shevchenko	Maria Bucatari	Viktoria Bogoslavskaya	—	—
April 2012 – June 2012	Anastasia Shevchenko	Maria Bucatari	—	—	—
June 2012 – September 2012	Anastasia Shevchenko	Maria Bucatari	Maria Nedelkova	—	—
September 2012 – November 2015	Anastasia Shevchenko	Maria Bucatari	—	—	—
November 2015–present	Veronika Kononenko	Arina Milan	Maya Podolskaya	—	—

== Discography ==
=== Studio albums ===
1. 2001 — "Детки"
2. 2003 — "Так и быть"
3. 2003 — "Кто-то играет в любовь…" (re-released "Так и быть")
4. 2004 — "Super Dетка"
5. 2006 — "Стихи в метро или Одни дома"
6. 2008 — "Ты мой парень"
7. 2011 — "Знаешь"
8. 2014 — "Фиолетовая пудра"
9. 2016 — "Золотой альбом"

=== Remix albums ===
1. 2002 — "Не дети"

=== Compilation albums ===
1. 2002 — "Кто?!"
2. 2012 — "Лучшие песни"
3. 2015 — "Top 30"
4. 2018 — "Девочка хочет секса"
5. 2022 — "Новое и лучшее»

=== Mini-albums and maxi-singles ===
1. 2011 — "Знаешь" (mini version)
2. 2011 — "До Луны на метро (Remixes)"
3. 2011 — "Я такая (Remixes)"
4. 2013 — "Подруга" (digital)

=== Singles ===
1. 2001 — "Мелом"
2. 2002 — "Никто"
3. 2002 — "Холодно"
4. 2002 — "Кто?"
5. 2003 — "5 минут на любовь"
6. 2003 — "Так и быть"
7. 2003 — "Дождь по крышам"
8. 2003 — "Песня без слов..."
9. 2003 — "Яй-я"
10. 2004 — "Super dетка"
11. 2004 — "Quanto costa"
12. 2006 — "Стихи в метро"
13. 2006 — "Скучаю"
14. 2007 — "Ёлки-палки"
15. 2008 — "Непростой"
16. 2009 — "Он меня провожал"
17. 2013 — "Подруга"
18. 2013 — "Я написала любовь"
19. 2013 — "Банальная история" (with Master Spensor)
20. 2013 — "Папа, ты прав"
21. 2014 — "Жаль"
22. 2015 — "Волшебство"
23. 2015 — "Супер детка (2016)"
24. 2015 — "Пять минут на любовь (Remix 2016)"
25. 2015 — "Я ухожу от тебя" (with Tres)
26. 2016 — "Наша песня"
27. 2016 — "Ты – моя невесомость"
28. 2016 — "Сэлфи с войны"
29. 2016 — "Мяу"
30. 2016 — "Забываю"
31. 2016 — "Я тебя забываю"
32. 2017 — "Не такая я"
33. 2017 — "Сильно люблю тебя"
34. 2017 — "Танцуй, моя Москва"
35. 2018 — "Научил любить"
36. 2018 — "Белый дым"
37. 2019 — "Сверхновая"
38. 2019 — "Белое платье"
39. 2019 — "Не Алёнка"
40. 2020 — "Я твоя девочка"

=== Unreleased tracks ===
1. "Далеко ли до Таллина" (2003) — V. Voronina, O. Moreva, E. Oleinikova (with band "Горячие головы")
2. "Funny Mix" (2004) — V. Voronina, O. Moreva, I. Yakovleva
3. "Мари полюбила Хуана" (2004) — V. Voronina, O. Moreva, I. Yakovleva, D. Gavrilchuk
4. "Mega Mix" (2005) — V. Voronina, O. Moreva, I. Yakovleva, D. Gavrilchuk
5. "Just like you" ("Melom" English version) (2007) — V. Voronina, I. Yakovleva, M. Bucatari
6. "Капкан" (2009) — V. Voronina, M. Bucatari, A. Shevchenko
7. "Горностай!" ("Gangnam Style" Russian cover) (2012) — M. Bucatari, A. Shevchenko (feat. DJ Yankovski)
8. "Украина, Россия с тобой!" (2014) — M. Bucatari, A. Shevchenko

== Videos ==
Year	Title	Line-up
2001	"Мелом"	V. Voronina, V. Petrenko, Y. Garanina
2002	"Мелом (Remix)"	V. Voronina, V. Petrenko, Y. Garanina
2002	"Никто"	V. Voronina, V. Petrenko, Y. Garanina
2002	"Для тебя" (with Miss Tee, Y. Nachalova, bands Не замужем, Дайкири, Белый шоколад)	V. Voronina, V. Petrenko, Y. Garanina
2002	"5 минут на любовь" / "5 минут на любовь (Remix)"	V. Voronina, O. Moreva, E. Oleinikova
2003	"Так и быть"	V. Voronina, O. Moreva, E. Oleinikova
2003	"Яй-я"	V. Voronina, O. Moreva, E. Oleinikova, I. Yakovleva, N. Korshunova
2004	"Super Dетка"	V. Voronina, O. Moreva, I. Yakovleva
2004	"Funny Mix"	V. Voronina, O. Moreva, I. Yakovleva
2004	"Quanto Costa (Remix)"	V. Voronina, O. Moreva, I. Yakovleva
2004	"Девочка хочет sexa"	V. Voronina, O. Moreva, I. Yakovleva, D. Gavrilchuk
2004	"Мари полюбила Хуана"	V. Voronina, O. Moreva, I. Yakovleva, D. Gavrilchuk
2005	"Mega Mix"	V. Voronina, O. Moreva, I. Yakovleva, D. Gavrilchuk
2006	"Стихи в метро"	V. Voronina, O. Moreva, I. Yakovleva
2006	"Скучаю"	V. Voronina, O. Moreva, I. Yakovleva
2007	"Ёлки-палки"	V. Voronina, I. Yakovleva, M. Bucatari
2009	"Над моей землёй"	V. Voronina, I. Yakovleva, M. Bucatari
2009	"Он меня провожал"	V. Voronina, I. Yakovleva, M. Bucatari
2010	"Знаешь (DJ Pomeha Remix)"	V. Voronina, M. Bucatari, A. Shevchenko
2011	"Я такая (DJ Pomeha Remix)"	M. Bucatari, A. Shevchenko
2011	"Я такая"	M. Bucatari, A. Shevchenko
2013	"Подруга"	M. Bucatari, A. Shevchenko
2013	"Я Написала Любовь"	M. Bucatari, A. Shevchenko
2014	"Жаль"	M. Bucatari, A. Shevchenko
2014	"Украина, Россия с тобой!"	M. Bucatari, A. Shevchenko
2015	"Волшебство"	M. Bucatari, A. Shevchenko
2015	"Я ухожу от тебя" (with TRES)	M. Bucatari, A. Shevchenko (feat. A. Milan, V. Kononenko, M. Podolskaya)
2016	"Сэлфи с войны"	A. Milan, V. Kononenko, M. Podolskaya
2016	"Ты — моя невесомость"	A. Milan, V. Kononenko, M. Podolskaya
2016	"Голая в стразах"	A. Milan, V. Kononenko, M. Podolskaya
2017	"Не такая я"	A. Milan, M. Podolskaya, K. Krivyuk
2018	"Научил любить"	A. Milan, M. Podolskaya, K. Krivyuk
2019	"Белое платье"	A. Milan, M. Podolskaya, E. Shishkina
2019	"Не Алёнка"	A. Milan, M. Podolskaya, E. Shishkina
2020	"Я твоя девочка"	A. Milan, M. Podolskaya, E. Shishkina
2020	"Океан"	V. Voronina, O. Moreva, E. Oleinikova (only voices)

== Accolades ==
- 2003 — "Top League" ("Высшая лига") for the performance with band "Горячие головы" "Daleko li do Tallina"
- 2003 and 2005 — "Boom of the Year / Bomb of the Year" ("Бум года / Бомба года")
- 2003 — the song "Tak i byt" was nominated at "Pesnya goda"
- 2003 and 2004 — "100% hit" ("Стопудовый хит")
- 2004 — the song "Quanto costa" won the award at "Pesnya goda"
- 2004 — Golden Gramophone Award for the song "Yay-ya" ("Яй-я"); "Golden Gramophone Award in Saint Petersburg" for the song "Super detka"
- 2004 — "Superdisc / Silver disc" ("Супердиск / Серебряный диск") for the album "Super detka"
- 2005 — the song "Govorila ne liubliu" was nominated at "Pesnya goda"
