= The Belkin Tales =

1831 short story collection by Alexander Pushkin

The Tales of the Late Ivan Petrovich Belkin
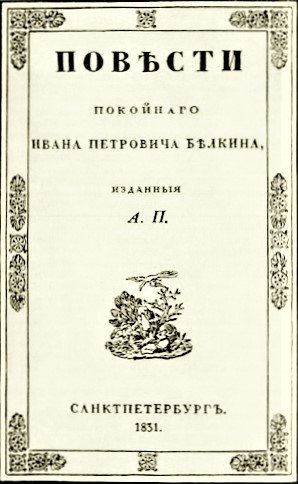
- Author: Alexander Pushkin
- Original title: По́вести поко́йного Ива́на Петро́вича Бе́лкина
- Language: Russian
- Genre: Novelette collection
- Publication date: 1831
- Publication place: Russia
- Text: The Tales of the Late Ivan Petrovich Belkin at Wikisource

The Tales of the Late Ivan Petrovich Belkin (Russian: «По́вести поко́йного Ива́на Петро́вича Бе́лкина», 1831) is a series of five novelettes and a fictional editorial introduction by Russian author Aleksandr Pushkin. The five novelettes, while very different, are united by the image of their fictional author and occasional first-person narrator.

== Purported author ==
The collection is opened with the editorial, purportedly by a (fictional) publisher of Belkin's tales, and a letter from Belkin's (fictional) neighbor. The tales themselves are not related to one another, except that they are said to be stories told by various people to a recently deceased pomeshchik, Ivan Petrovich Belkin. The introduction continues to say that Belkin was an interesting and mysterious man, even to the point that the woman he left his estate to had never met him. It is also mentioned that Belkin's favorite pastime was to collect and hear stories, several of which are to be presented to the reader.

== The Shot ==
This story was told to Belkin by Colonel I.L.P., who in the early days of his military career was stationed at a country outpost. The officers always visit a peculiar man named Silvio to play cards. Silvio is always practicing shooting, and the walls of his house are full of bullet holes. On one occasion the host is insulted by one of his guests, but he does not challenge his guest to a duel, as custom dictates. He is then considered to be a coward by most of the officers, but explains his situation to the narrator, his only confidant: years ago he engaged in a duel, in which his opponent was eating cherries while waiting for him to shoot. He decided that as life apparently was meaningless to the endlessly fortunate young man, he would not shoot, but rather ask to postpone the duel. If he had now engaged the officer in a duel over the card game, he would almost certainly have killed him, but also taken the small risk of dying before being able to exact revenge. However, Silvio soon learns that his former opponent is engaged to be married, and so may now no longer be indifferent towards life. This is the moment Silvio has been waiting for, and he leaves to get his revenge.

After several years, the narrator leaves active duty on his parents' death and leaves for his country estate (exactly as we are told Belkin himself did in the preface). After a while, his neighbors arrive, in particular a pretty young countess, and the narrator visits them soon after. On the wall he notices a painting of a Swiss landscape with two bullet holes very close together. The narrator, seeing this, tells his neighbor about a man he knew in the army who was an extraordinary shot, and tells the count of Silvio. The count tells the narrator that he was Silvio's opponent, and shortly after his wedding Silvio claimed his right to a duel. The neighbor draws the right to shoot first, but misses, and the bullet ends up in the painting. As Silvio aims to shoot, the neighbor's bride enters the room. Silvio takes pity on her and then without aiming, shoots the painting in almost exactly the same spot as the count, thereby both sparing the count's life and demonstrating how easily he could have ended it. Silvio, honor satisfied, leaves the couple, and is later, we are informed, killed leading a regiment in battle. The narrator never meets him again.

== The Blizzard ==
This story was told to Belkin by Miss K.I.T., who herself is not involved in the story. The Blizzard, also translated as "The Snowstorm" (Russian Метель), concerns a young noblewoman, Marya Gavrilovna (Gavrilovna is a patronymic, not a surname), and her young lover, a lieutenant named Vladimir. The reason for their relationship is not specifically given, but the story famously states "Marya Gavrilovna was raised on French novels and consequently was in love." Marya Gavrilovna's parents do not approve of the relationship due to the difference in social status between the two lovers, and Marya Gavrilovna and her attendant conspire with Vladimir to elope and marry in a secret midnight ceremony in a nearby village. At first, Marya Gavrilovna agrees to the plan, but as the ceremony approaches, she feels more and more anxious. On the night the ceremony is to take place, she almost doesn't go as in addition to her growing anxiety, a terrible snowstorm is occurring, but her attendant persuades her to go.

Meanwhile, Vladimir sets out from his military encampment on his way to the church. However, he becomes lost in severe blizzard conditions and cannot find his way. He stops at a small hamlet to obtain directions from locals only to find that he has been going the wrong direction the entire night and is too far from the church to make it to the ceremony on time. The next morning, Marya Gavrilovna returns home and goes to sleep as if nothing has happened, but she soon grows gravely ill and becomes delirious with fever. During her semiconscious state, she mumbles many things, one of which is her plan to elope with Vladimir. Upon hearing this, Marya Gavrilovna's parents grant permission for her to marry Vladimir, but they attempt to contact him, they receive a letter from him stating that he is off with the army, and the narrator informs the reader that soon after Vladimir is killed in the Battle of Borodino.

After this, Marya Gavrilovna and her family move to a new estate, and after some time, suitors come to seek Marya Gavrilovna's hand in marriage. Marya Gavrilovna, apparently still in love with Vladimir, turns them all away except for a hussar named Burmin. Their relationship progresses, until one day, Marya Gavrilovna is reading by a lake, and knows that when Burmin comes to visit her that day, he will ask to marry her. He proceeds to tell her that though he loves her, he cannot marry her because one night, several years ago, he was traveling during a snowstorm when he became lost. Pulling into a small town, he is met by a priest, who tells him he is late for the wedding. He is brought into the hall where Marya Gavrilovna had been awaiting Vladimir. The ceremony is carried out, but as Burmin turns to kiss the bride, Marya Gavrilovna faints. Upon concluding this story, Burmin tells Marya Gavrilovna that he still feels faithful to his wife, even though he does not know who she is. Marya Gavrilovna asks him why he does not recognize her, and each realizing the other's identity, they collapse into one another's arms.

== The Undertaker ==
This story was told to Belkin by shop employee B.V., who like the character who told Belkin "The Blizzard", is not involved in the story. The tale concerns an undertaker, Adrian Prokhorov, who moves from the Basmanny District in northeastern Moscow to Nikitskaya Street, west of the Kremlin. Prokhorov, who is depicted as cold and regimented, never deviating from his routine, soon sets up shop in his new neighborhood. Soon after, he becomes acquainted with his neighbors, mostly German merchants, who come to visit him. They invite him to a wedding anniversary dinner with all of the local merchants, where after a long night of card games and other entertainment, several toasts are proposed. Prokhorov is offended after someone jokingly offers a toast to the health of Prokhorov's customers, and leaves suddenly, claiming that he will hold his house-warming party with his customers rather than his neighbors. To his horror, when he returns home, all the reanimated corpses have accepted his invitation and are moving around his room, even Prokhorov's first customer, who returns as a skeleton. The corpses accuse him of cheating, overcharging, and numerous other offenses. Prokhorov is then woken by his housekeeper, revealing that it was all a drunken dream. He tells her to fetch his daughters and make a cup of tea.

== The Station Master ==
This story was told to Belkin by titular counsellor A.G.N., and is a first-hand account. The story opens with the narrator complaining to the reader in a humorous fashion about collegiate registrars, the lowest of the fourteen ranks in the Imperial Russian civil service, who run posting stations along the country's roads, providing such services as fresh horses, beds, and food to travelers. The narrator derides collegiate registrars as power-drunk, unreasonable, asking the reader who hasn't cursed them, and asked to see their "vile ledger book". After this opening tirade, however, the narrator relents, and states that he will tell us a story about one particular sympathetic station master he met during his extensive travels on official business.

The narrator begins by telling us of one of his travels, which brought him to an infrequently used road very far out in the country. Stopping at the local posting station, he is captivated by the station's order and decoration, among which is an illustrated version of the biblical story of the Prodigal Son. When asked by the station master if he would like some tea, as all of the horses are out and he will be required to wait for some time until new horses can be prepared, the narrator accepts and stays a while. Shortly after, the tea is brought out by the station master's daughter, Dunya, who is described as being beautiful and very adult in demeanor and mannerisms. Dunya and the narrator converse as if they were good friends, and the narrator, who initially expressed his disapproval of having to wait, is sorry to leave the posting station after Dunya allows him to kiss her before he leaves.

The narrator goes on his way, but the posting station where he met Dunya remains in the back of his head. Three years later, the narrator decides to visit Dunya and her father. Upon reaching the station, which is no longer on an official imperial road, he finds the station in disrepair and the old station master a broken man. When the narrator inquires as to the state of his daughter, the old station master concedes that he has no idea where she is or what condition she is in. Although the old station master will not tell the story of his daughter's disappearance at first, when the narrator offers the old station master something to drink, the old station master relents and begins to tell the story.

Some time after the narrator's first visit, a dashing hussar captain (ninth rank) called Minsky comes to the posting station, and like many other visitors, has to wait until new horses could be prepared. The hussar is initially enraged that someone of his rank would be forced to wait by a fourteenth-grade civil servant, and the station master calls Dunya in to calm him. Dunya begins to talk to Minsky, and just like the narrator, he takes a great liking to her and forgets his annoyance at being forced to stay at the station. Soon after, however, he falls gravely ill and remains at the station for several days, during which time Dunya cares for him day and night. When he gets better, as a token of gratitude he offers to take Dunya on a ride across the village in his fancy carriage. Dunya hesitates, but her father tells her that she may go, and she gets in the carriage. Minsky, his illness feigned, then proceeds to kidnap Dunya, who is never seen by her father again, even though he tracks Minsky down in Saint Petersburg. The station master is unsuccessful in his attempts to see Dunya (now going by her full name Avdotya), and he returns bitterly to his nearly defunct posting station.

Several years after hearing the old station master's story, the narrator returns to the remote village once again. The town has now been off the imperial road for several years, and upon visiting the old station master's house, the narrator learns that he has died, most likely from alcoholism. The family who now lives in the house offer to have one of their children show the narrator to the old post master's grave. The narrator remarks that the graveyard is the most desolate place he has ever seen, and feels that he has wasted his time and money in visiting the village yet again. Shortly after, the child who brought the narrator to the graveyard tells the narrator that not long before he arrived, a woman came to the village in a fancy carriage with several children, a governess, footmen, and wearing an expensive dress. She also asked to see the postmaster's grave, but said that she knew the way to the graveyard and did not need to be shown. The child continues by saying that the woman bowed down on the station master's grave and wept. Realizing that Dunya returned to her father's grave and has not been abandoned by Minsky as her father feared, the narrator feels at peace, and no longer thinks that the trip was wasted.

== The Squire's Daughter ==
This story was also told to Belkin by Miss K.I.T., who again does not play a part in the story. The story is also translated under the name "Mistress into Maid". (The original title, Барышня-крестьянка, literally means "The Young Lady-Peasant".) The story involves two young people, Lizaveta Muromsky and Alexei Berestov, whose fathers are both wealthy landowners who dislike each because of the way the other runs his estate. Berestov accuses Muromsky of being an Anglophile, and ignoring the traditional Russian way of doing things. Muromsky levels accusations against Berestov of not realizing how inefficient the traditional ways are.

The story opens with Lizaveta Muromsky's maid Nastya informing her that she is going to the Berestov's estate to celebrate a name day party being held there for one of her friends, a servant on the Berestov estate. Later in the evening, Nastya returns, and tells tales of the goings-on at the Berestov's name day festival. Nastya tells Lizaveta (whose father tiresomely insists on calling her Betsy) of Alexei's behavior at the name day festival, relating how energetic and entertaining he was, even joining in the peasants' games. Lizaveta questions Nastya about this further. Lizaveta already knew Alexei through society, and held little opinion of him, namely because he acted in a melancholy manner, as was common among young, upper-class early 19th century Russians. Lizaveta considered this to be a shame, as she found him quite attractive. After hearing that he acted in such a manner at the name-day festival, she resolved to meet him in a peasant's costume collecting mushrooms in a forest Alexei frequents while hunting.

Lizaveta meets Alexei in the forest as planned, and begins to talk to him in the guise and dialect of the peasant girl Akulina. Berestov is enchanted with the girl, and soon teaches her to write so the two may correspond, and is amazed when Akulina becomes completely literate within two weeks. This continues for some time, until one morning, the elder Muromsky is injured in a hunting accident and is taken in by Berestov. The two reconcile their differences, and the Berestovs are invited over to the Muromsky estate for dinner. Lizaveta is terrified by this prospect and begs her father to allow her to conceal her identity during the dinner. Because Lizaveta has a reputation as a prankster, her father allows her to do so, and the dinner passes without her identity being revealed, thanks to her rich clothing and liberal use of make-up. A short time after, the Berestov family encounters financial difficulties, and Berestov commands Alexei to marry Lizaveta Muromsky, the only suitable heiress in the area. At first, he is hesitant, and runs to the Muromsky's house to explain to Lizaveta that his father wishes that they marry, but he cannot marry her because he loves Akulina. Alexei enters the Muromsky's kitchen, only to find Lizaveta reading one of Alexei's letters. The story ends as Alexei realises Lizaveta/Akulina's true identity.

=== Adaptations ===
Films based on it include Miss Peasant (1916) and The Aristocratic Peasant Girl (1995).

It was the base of several operettas, including the 1878 operetta Lizinka by Croatian composer Ivan Zajc, libretto by Josip Eugen Tomić, the 1913 operetta Polenblut (Polish Blood) composed by Oskar Nedbal, libretto by Leo Stein.

Ballets include The Aristocratic Peasant Girl by Boris Asafyev (1946).

The operetta Polenblut was the base of the 1934 musical film Polish Blood.

== Sources ==
В.Е. Хализев, С.В. Шешунова (1989). Цикл А.С. Пушкина "Повести Белкина". М.: Высшая школа.
