= Russya =

Ukrainian singer, and musician (born 1968)

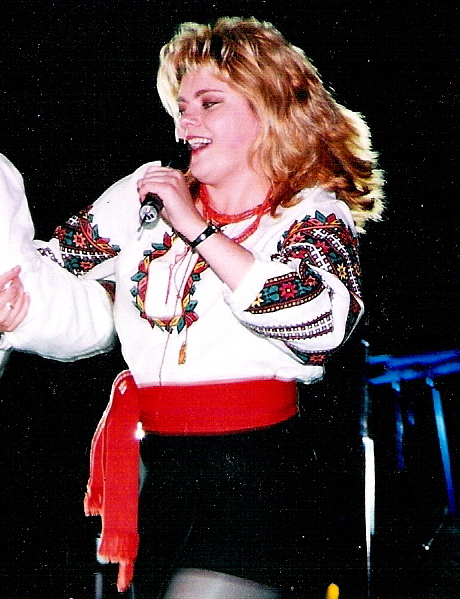
- Russya. Concert in Kyiv June 1998

Background information
- Also known as: Russya; Irina Ossaoulenko
- Born: Iryna Volodymyrivna Poryvai; June 9, 1968 (age 58)
- Origin: Kyiv, Ukraine
- Genres: Pop, dance, disco
- Occupations: Singer, musician, choral conductor, artist
- Instruments: Piano, accordion, organ
- Years active: 1989–1999, 2007–present

Irina Volodymyrivna Ossaoulenko (née Poryvai; Ukrainian: Ірина Володимирівна Осауленко (Поривай); born June 9, 1968), better known by her stage name Russya (Ukrainian: Руся), is a Ukrainian pop singer, musical pedagogue and conductor. She released her first song Don't stand by My Window in 1989. Russya had Top 10 hits on the Ukrainian charts in the late 1980s, and through the early and mid 1990s. She was a two-time winner in Best Female Artist of Ukraine in 1990 and 1991.

== Biography ==
Iryna Poryvai was born on 9 June 1968 in Kyiv. Her sister is the Russian pop singer Natasha Korolyova, and her husband, K. Ossaoulenko, is a composer. After graduating as a choir conductor from the Kyiv Musical School, in 1989-1991 she engaged in numerous tours around Ukraine, achieving great popularity. In 1992 Russya and her husband emigrated to Canada, where she continued her career as pop singer, cooperating with the "Yevshan" music company in Montreal. She also worked as a conductor at St. Andrew's Orthodox church in Toronto.

Russya performed most of her songs in Ukrainian, along with some compositions in Russian. She made a number of records on Ukrainian Radio and television. She retired from recording pop music in 1997, but continued to tour (sometimes with her sister, Natasha Korolyova) until 1999. During the 2000s she worked as a private music teacher at a college in the United States. In 2007, she returned to recording with an album "The Best of Russya".

== Discography ==
- 1989 – "The Fortuneteller" (Ukrainian: Ворожка)
- 1989 – "Christmas Eve" (Ukrainian: Різдвяна ніч)
- 1990 – "Forgive me, mommy" (Ukrainian: Даруй мені, мамо)
- 1990 – "Cinderella" (Ukrainian: Попелюшка)
- 1990 – "Russya" (Ukrainian: Руся)
- 1991 - "Little Happiness" (Russian: Маленькое счастье)
- 1992 – "Russya's Greatest Hits"
- 1994 – "Kyiv Girl" (Ukrainian: Кияночка)
- 1994 – "Cheremshyna" (Ukrainian: Черемшина)
- 1997 – "My American Guy" (Ukrainian: Мій американець)
- 1998 – "White Lace" (Russian: Белые кружева)
- 2007 – "The Best of Russya"
- 2007 – "Ornaments" (Ukrainian: Візерунки)
- 2009 – "Small Presents" (Ukrainian: Маленькі подарунки)
- 2009 – "Christmas Presents" (Ukrainian: Різдвяні подарунки)
- 2012 – "Greatest Hits -top 40"
- 2017 – "Memories of the future"

== Websites and resources ==
- Russya's official website.Офіційна українська веб-сторінка Русі
- Natasha Koroleva's web site
- http://kmstudio.com.ua/index.php?nma=cherem&fla=stat&nm=rusia
