= Miss Peasant =

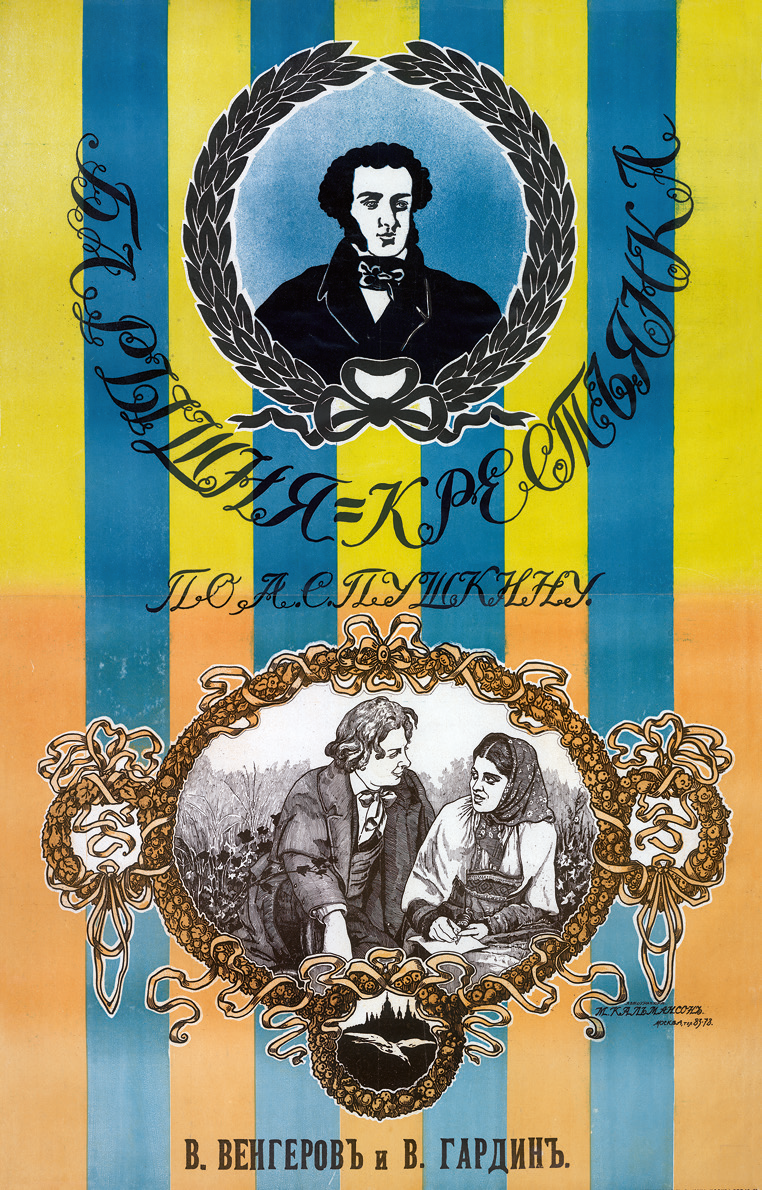
- Russian poster
- Russian: Барышня-крестьянка
- Directed by: Olga Preobrazhenskaya, Vladimir Gardin
- Written by: Alexander Pushkin (novel)
- Release date: 1916

Miss Peasant (Russian: Барышня-крестьянка, romanized: Baryshnya-krestyanka, lit. 'The Young Lady-Peasant') was a 1916 Russian black and white silent full-length feature film under the joint direction and screenwriting of Olga Preobrazhenskaya and the actor, screenwriter and director Vladimir Gardin. It was based on the novelette with the same (Russian) name by Alexander Pushkin from his cycle The Belkin Tales. It is a lost film. ( Pushkin's novel was also translated as The Squire's Daughter and Mistress into Maid.)

The film was the first work of Olga Preobrazhenskaya as a director. As she put it, "the film came out, it was praised, but since it was the first production of a woman director, it was treated with distrust, and on the posters and reviews my name was often written with a male ending or attributed to the production of other directors."

== See also ==
- The Aristocratic Peasant Girl (1995), another film rendering of Pushkin's novelette
