= Nepara =

Russian pop music duo

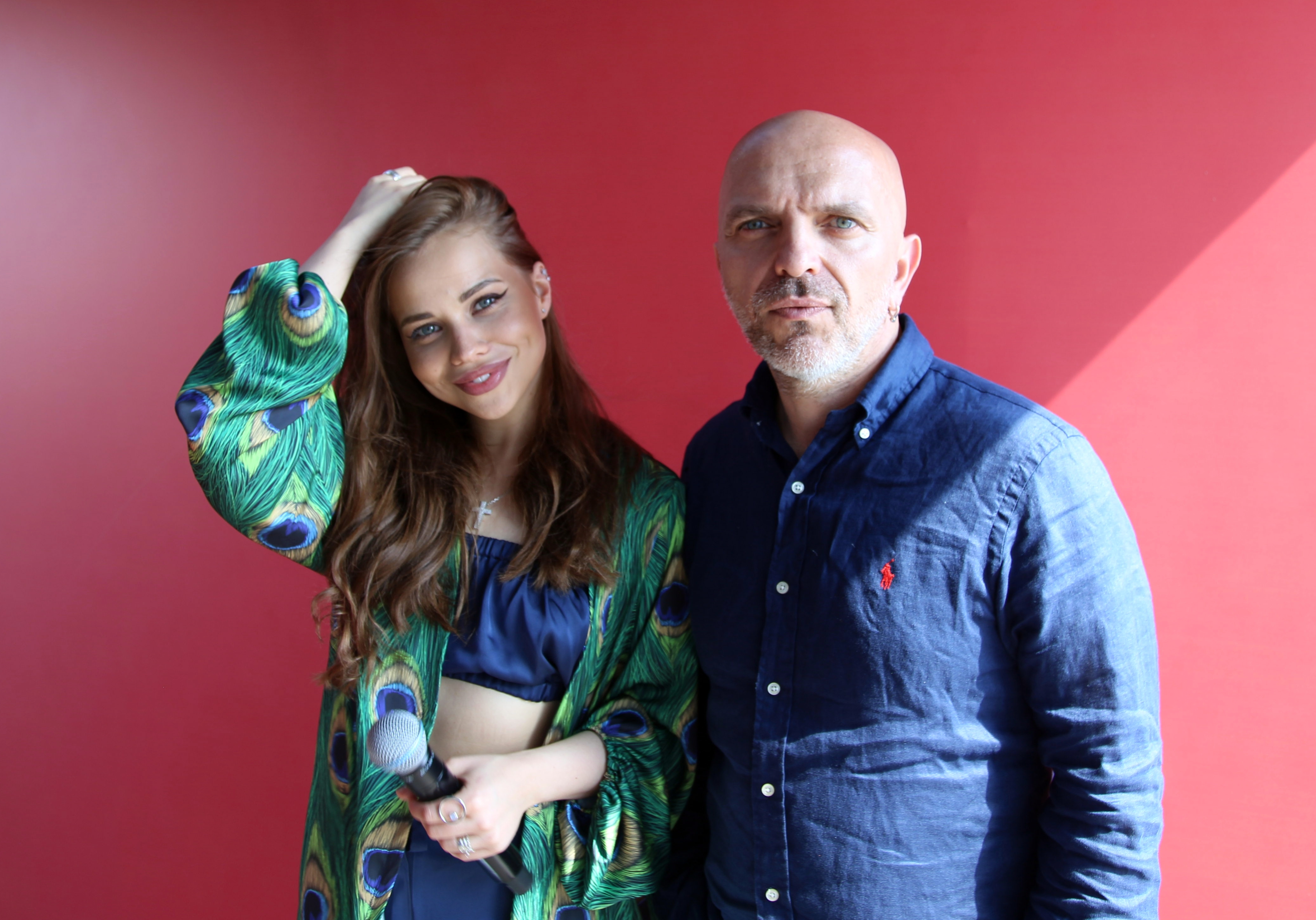
- Group "Nepara" (composition since 2022)

Background information
- Origin: Moscow
- Genre: Pop
- Years active: 2002–present
- Members: Alexander Shoua; Daria Khramova
- Past members: Victoria Talyshinskaya; Marianna Harutyunyan
- Website: nepara.ru

Nepara (Russian: Непара, 'Not a pair') is a Russian pop music duo formed in 2002, composed of Aleksandr Shoua (Russian: Александр Шоуа) and Victoria Talyshinskaya (Russian: Виктория Талышинская). The duet was produced by Oleg Nekrasov.

== Background ==
In 2003, the first debut album Another Family was released, the author of the music in some songs was Alexander Shoua. The album includes the song "Autumn" (music by Bobby Hebb, lyrics by Karen Kavaleryan ), a Russian-language cover version of the notorious hit "Sunny", first performed in the mid-1960s by its rightful author, Bobby Hebb, but known in Russia from the disco version of the group Boney M.

In 2012, Alexander Shoua decided to start a solo career, and the group disbanded. However, in 2013, the duo reunited.

In 2013, the band members admitted that they had a romantic relationship for some time.

In 2018, at the Comedy Club, Alexander Shoua announced that the Nepara group no longer existed and that he had taken up a solo career. However, in 2019 the band performed in several concerts.

On 13 September 2019, at a press conference, the NSN officially announced the closure of the Nepara project. On the same day, the premiere of the video clip "Stop Me" and the release of Alexander Shoua's solo album took place.

At the beginning of 2020, Alexander Shoua acquired the rights to the Nepara brand and the entire repertoire. In December, on the set of "Disco. Golden Hits" of the Muz-TV channel, Shoua introduced new soloists, Daria Khramova and Marianna Harutyunyan.

In February 2022, the group's backing vocalist Marianna Arutyunyan left the group.

In July 2022, Alexander Shoua and the Nepara band took part in the AguTeens Music Forum Gala Concert of the III Leonid Agutin Music Educational Forum.
