= Strelki =

Russian pop band, formed in 1997

- Also known as: Sтрелки, Стрелки
- Origin: Russia
- Genres: Pop
- Years active: 1997–2006/2009; 2016–present
- Labels: Gala Records; ОРТ-Рекордс; АРС Рекордс; Гранд Рекордс; Pro-More Music
- Members: Svetlana «Hera» Bobkina; Maria «Margo» Bibilova; Ekaterina «Radistka Cat» Kravtsova; Salome «Tori» Rosiver
- Past members: Liya Bykova (1997—1998); Anastasia Rodina (1997—1999); Maria Solovyova (1997—1999); Yulia Beretta (1997—2002); Larisa Batulina (1998—2003); Elena Mishina (2002—2003); Oksana Ustinova (2002—2006); Natalia Bochkaryova (Deeva) (2002—2006); Galina Trapezova (2003—2004); Nika Night (2003—2006); Anastasia Osipova (2003—2006); Anastasia Bondareva-Kovalyova (2003—2007, 2011—2012); Lana Timakova (2002—2009)
- Website: www.strelkiofficial.ru

Strelki (Russian: Стрелки) is a Russian pop music group formed in 1997, best known for their song "Ty brosil menya" (Ты бросил меня; You Left Me), which became a hit in Russia. The group was created as a Russian version of Spice Girls. After the split-up of original line-up, the band performed few years with secondary line-ups. In 2016, original Strelki line-up reunited.

== Discography ==
=== Albums ===
Year	Title	Line-up
1998	Стрелки идут вперёд	Yulia Beretta, S. Bobkina, М. Корнеева, Е. Кравцова, М. Соловьёва, А. Родина, Л. Быкова
1998	Вечеринки в Москве (Single)	Yulia Beretta, S. Bobkina, М. Корнеева, Е. Кравцова, М. Соловьёва, А. Родина
1998	С Новым годом! (Single)	Yulia Beretta, S. Bobkina, М. Корнеева, Е. Кравцова, М. Соловьёва, А. Родина, Л. Батулина
1999	Всё по...	Yulia Beretta, S. Bobkina, М. Корнеева, Е. Кравцова, М. Соловьёва, А. Родина, Л. Батулина
1999	Gold	Yulia Beretta, S. Bobkina, М. Корнеева, Е. Кравцова, М. Соловьёва, А. Родина, Л. Батулина, Л. Быкова
1999	Шипы и Pозы	Yulia Beretta, S. Bobkina, М. Корнеева, Е. Кравцова, А. Родина, М. Соловьёва, Л. Батулина
2000	Нелюбовь (Single)	Yulia Beretta, S. Bobkina, М. Корнеева, Е. Кравцова, Л. Батулина, С. Кития
2000	Стрелки 2000	Yulia Beretta, S. Bobkina, М. Корнеева, Е. Кравцова, Л. Батулина, С. Кития
2001	Стрелки 2001 (re-launched)	Yulia Beretta, S. Bobkina, М. Корнеева, Е. Кравцова, Л. Батулина, С. Кития
2001	MegaMix	Yulia Beretta, S. Bobkina, М. Корнеева, Е. Кравцова, Л. Батулина
2002	Люби меня сильнее	Yulia Beretta, S. Bobkina, М. Корнеева, Е. Кравцова, Л. Батулина

=== Videos ===
Year	Title	Director	Line-up	Album
1997	«Мамочка»	В. Фишман	Ю. Беретта, S. Bobkina, М. Корнеева, Е. Кравцова, М. Соловьёва, А. Родина, Л. Быкова	Стрелки идут вперёд
1998	«На вечеринке»	Л. Величковский	Ю. Беретта, S. Bobkina, М. Корнеева, Е. Кравцова, М. Соловьёва, А. Родина, Л. Быкова	Стрелки идут вперёд
1998	«Курортный роман»	И. Силивёрстов	Ю. Беретта, S. Bobkina, М. Корнеева, Е. Кравцова, М. Соловьёва, А. Родина	Стрелки идут вперёд
1998	«Первый учитель»	И. Силивёрстов	Ю. Беретта, S. Bobkina, М. Корнеева, Е. Кравцова, М. Соловьёва, А. Родина	Стрелки идут вперёд
1998	«Москва»	Клип смонтирован из советской хроники.	Ю. Беретта, S. Bobkina, М. Корнеева, Е. Кравцова, М. Соловьёва, А. Родина, Л. Батулина (Единственный клип, где участницы коллектива не появлялись)	Вечеринки в Москве (макси-сингл)
1998	«Красавчик»	В. Разгулин	Ю. Беретта, S. Bobkina, М. Корнеева, Е. Кравцова, М. Соловьёва, А. Родина, Л. Батулина (также К. Васильева и М. Белякова)	Всё по...
1998	«С Новым годом!»	М. Макаренков	Ю. Беретта, S. Bobkina, М. Корнеева, Е. Кравцова, М. Соловьёва, А. Родина, Л. Батулина	С Новым годом! (макси-сингл)
1999	«На вечеринке (Remix)»	Л. Величковский	Ю. Беретта, S. Bobkina, М. Корнеева, Е. Кравцова, М. Соловьёва, А. Родина, Л. Батулина (также Л. Быкова, О. Яшанькина, К. Васильева и М. Белякова)	Вечеринки в Москве (макси-сингл)
1999	«Ты бросил меня»	И. Силивёрстов	Ю. Беретта, S. Bobkina, М. Корнеева, Е. Кравцова, М. Соловьёва, А. Родина, Л. Батулина	Всё по...
1999	«Ты бросил меня (Remix)»	И. Силивёрстов	Ю. Беретта, S. Bobkina, М. Корнеева, Е. Кравцова, М. Соловьёва, А. Родина, Л. Батулина	ТВА
1999	«Шипы и розы»	Клип смонтирован с кадров концерта в «Олимпийском» 24 апреля 1999 года	Ю. Беретта, S. Bobkina, М. Корнеева, Е. Кравцова, М. Соловьёва, А. Родина, Л. Батулина	Шипы и розы
1999	«Я хорошая»	А. Игудин	Ю. Беретта, S. Bobkina, М. Корнеева, Е. Кравцова, М. Соловьёва, А. Родина, Л. Батулина	Шипы и розы
1999	«Нет любви»	С. Кальварский	Ю. Беретта, S. Bobkina, М. Корнеева, Е. Кравцова, М. Соловьёва, А. Родина, Л. Батулина (также К. Васильева)	Шипы и розы
1999	«Я вернусь»	С. Кальварский	Ю. Беретта, S. Bobkina, М. Корнеева, Е. Кравцова, М. Соловьёва, Л. Батулина (также К. Васильева)	Шипы и розы
1999	«С Новым годом! (Remix, новая версия)»	М. Макаренков	Ю. Беретта, S. Bobkina, М. Корнеева, Е. Кравцова, М. Соловьёва, Л. Батулина (также А. Родина)	ТВА
2000	«Бумеранг»	А. Игудин	Ю. Беретта, S. Bobkina, М. Корнеева, Е. Кравцова, Л. Батулина, С. Кития (также М. Конова)	Стрелки 2000
2000	«Нелюбовь»	И. Силивёрстов	Ю. Беретта, S. Bobkina, М. Корнеева, Е. Кравцова, Л. Батулина, С. Кития	Нелюбовь (макси-сингл)
2000	«Солнце за горой»	А. Игудин	Ю. Беретта, S. Bobkina, М. Корнеева, Е. Кравцова, Л. Батулина	Стрелки 2000
2001	«Megamix»	Нарезка из клипов группы разных лет	Ю. Беретта, S. Bobkina, М. Корнеева, Е. Кравцова, Л. Батулина (также Л. Быкова, М. Соловьёва и А. Родина)	ТВА
2001	«Прости и прощай»	С. Кальварский	Ю. Беретта, S. Bobkina, М. Корнеева, Е. Кравцова, Л. Батулина	Люби меня сильнее
2002	«Девочка-веточка»	И. Миронова	Ю. Беретта, S. Bobkina, М. Корнеева, Е. Кравцова, Л. Батулина	Люби меня сильнее
2003	«Югорская долина»	С. Горов	S. Bobkina, М. Корнеева, Л. Батулина, Л. Тимакова, Н. Деева, О. Устинова, Е. Мишина	ТВА
2003	«Ветерок»	А. Демьяненко	Л. Батулина, Л. Тимакова, Н. Деева, О. Устинова, Г. Трапезова	ТВА
2003	«С Новым годом! (новая версия)»	Нарезка из клипов «С Новым годом!», «Югорская долина» и «Ветерок»	Л. Батулина, Л. Тимакова, Н. Деева, О. Устинова, Г. Трапезова (также Ю. Беретта, S. Bobkina, М. Корнеева, Е. Кравцова, М. Соловьёва, А. Родина и Е. Мишина)	ТВА
2003	«Лучший друг»	И. Силивёрстов	Л. Тимакова, Н. Деева, О. Устинова, Г. Трапезова, А. Бондарева, Н. Найт, А. Осипова	ТВА
2004	«Бежало лето»	unknown	Л. Тимакова, Н. Деева, О. Устинова, Г. Трапезова, А. Бондарева, Н. Найт, А. Осипова	ТВА
2004	«Костер из писем»	unknown	Л. Тимакова, Н. Деева, О. Устинова, Г. Трапезова, А. Бондарева, Н. Найт, А. Осипова	ТВА
2004	«Капает дождь»	unknown	Л. Тимакова, Н. Деева, О. Устинова, Г. Трапезова, А. Бондарева, Н. Найт, А. Осипова	ТВА
2004	«Семь морей»	unknown	Л. Тимакова, Н. Деева, О. Устинова, Г. Трапезова, А. Бондарева, Н. Найт, А. Осипова	ТВА
2004	«Не отпускай меня»	unknown	Л. Тимакова, Н. Деева, О. Устинова, Г. Трапезова, А. Бондарева, Н. Найт, А. Осипова	ТВА
2004	«Ты далеко»	unknown	Л. Тимакова, Н. Деева, О. Устинова, Г. Трапезова, А. Бондарева, Н. Найт, А. Осипова	ТВА
2005	«Валентинка»	unknown	Л. Тимакова, Н. Деева, О. Устинова, Г. Трапезова, А. Бондарева, Н. Найт, А. Осипова	ТВА
2005	«Не ходи»	unknown	Л. Тимакова, Н. Деева, О. Устинова, Г. Трапезова, А. Бондарева, Н. Найт, А. Осипова	ТВА
2005	«Жара» (original edit)	unknown	Л. Тимакова, Н. Деева, О. Устинова, Г. Трапезова, А. Бондарева, Н. Найт, А. Осипова	ТВА
2006	«Жара» (new edit)	unknown	Л. Тимакова, А. Осипова, А. Евдокимова, К. Резникова, Э. Токарева, Дебора, Н. Рубцова	ТВА
2006	«Жара» (NeoMaster DJ's Disco mix)	unknown	Л. Тимакова, А. Осипова, А. Евдокимова, К. Резникова, Э. Токарева, Дебора, Н. Рубцова	ТВА
2006	«Жара» (Romantic edition Студия 54 mix)	unknown	Л. Тимакова, А. Осипова, А. Евдокимова, К. Резникова, Э. Токарева, Дебора, Н. Рубцова	ТВА
2006	«Мама»	unknown	Л. Тимакова, А. Евдокимова, К. Резникова, Э. Токарева, Дебора, А. Симакова	ТВА
2007	«Missing You»	unknown	Л. Тимакова, А. Евдокимова, К. Резникова, Э. Токарева, Дебора, А. Симакова	ТВА
2007	«На тебя показали все стрелки»	unknown	Л. Тимакова, А. Евдокимова, К. Резникова, Э. Токарева, Дебора, А. Симакова	ТВА
