= Virus (Russian band) =

Russian band

ViRUS!
- Also known as: Вирус!
- Origin: Zelenograd, Russia
- Genres: Pop, techno, electro-house, progressive trance
- Years active: 1999–present
- Members: Olga Laki; Yuri Stupnik (DJ Doctor); Andrey Gudas
- Past members: Lyudmila Shushanikova (2000—2005); Timofey Kubar (2000—2005); Vyacheslav Kazanov (2000—2001); Vladimir Kukushkin (2001—2005)
- Website: virus-music.ru

ViRUS! (Russian: Вирус!) is a Russian band, formed in 1999, and currently composed of Olga Lucky, Yuri Stupnik (DJ Doctor) and Andrey Gudas. ViRUS! produced techno-based pop music. The band was at the peak of its popularity in 1999–2001, and disappeared from the mainstream of Russian pop music after releasing several popular songs.

== History ==
Stupnik and Gudas attended the High School of Zelenograd (near Moscow) in 1998. The group were originally known as Akvarel ("Watercolor"), then Vot Tak ("That's How"). In 1998 their record was discovered by producers Igor Seliverstov and Leonid Velichkovskiy. They renamed themselves to Virus and released their first album, Do not try to find me.

Virus toured in Germany, Russia, Israel, USA, Estonia, and other countries. Their song "alsou" was played on multiple radio stations. In 2005 they were involved in naming dispute involving LUCKY, DJ Doctor and DJ Chip, culminating in the rebranding of the band as ViRUS!.

Olga went on to have a solo career with her project Th3 CATS.

In 2019 they released a song called "In the Style Disco" the video of which depicts a nostalgic look at the 1990s.

== Discography ==
- 1999: Do Not Try to Find Me (Ты меня не ищи)
- 2000: Call Me (Позови меня)
- 2000: Give Me (Дай мне)
- 2001: For The Heat Of The Sun (Чтобы солнце грело)
- 2002: Virus of Happiness (Вирус счастья)
- 2003: Little Brother (Братишка)
- 2005: My Hero (Мой герой)
- 2007: ALL IN ONE (all discography in on CD)
- 2009: The Best DJ REMIX 2009 (remix by popular DJ's)
- 2009: Flight to stars (Polot k zvezdam)

=== 1999: Do not try to find me ===
- 1 Интро / Intro
- 2 Ты меня не ищи / Ty Menya Ne Ishchi
- 3 Все пройдет / Vse proydet
- 4 Без любви / Bez lyubvi
- 5 Игра / Igra
- 6 Помоги / Pomogi
- 7 Ручки / Ruchki
- 8 Мама / Mama
- 9 Нежное солнышко / Nezhnoe solnyshko
- 10 Письмо / Pis'mo
- 11 Я люблю / Ya lyublyu
- 12 Вирус А / Virus A

=== 2000: Call Me ===
- 1 Интро / Intro
- 2 Нарисуй / Narisuy
- 3 Не верь / Ne ver'
- 4 Почему? / Pochemu?
- 5 Мишени / Misheni
- 6 Бросай скорей / Brosay skorey
- 7 Позови меня / Pozovi menya
- 8 Отпускаю / Otpuskayu
- 9 Поппури (инструментальная версия) / Poppuri (instrumental'naya versiya)
- 10 Ножки II / Nozhki II
- 11 Вирус С / Virus C
- 12 Гимн LG / Gimn LG

=== 2000: Day Mne (Give me) ===
- 1 Интро / Intro
- 2 Папа / Papa
- 3 Весна / Vesna
- 4 Дай мне / Day mne
- 5 Без любви / Bez lyubvi
- 6 Ручки (remix) / Ruchki (remix)
- 7 Ты меня не ищи (remix) / Ty menya ne ishchi (remix)
- 8 Ножки / Nozhki
- 9 Kап-кап / Kap-kap / Tear Drops
- 10 Я не могу / Ya ne mogu
- 11 Нежное солнышко / Nezhnoe solnyshko
- 12 Все пройдет (remix) / Vse proydet (remix)
- 13 Вирус В / Virus B

=== 2001: For The Heat Of The Sun ===
- Попрошу тебя / Poproshu tebya
- Просто рядом иди / Prosto ryadom idi
- Девчонка / Devchonka
- Не для тебя она / Ne dlya tebya ona
- Над облаками / Nad oblakami
- Бросай меня / Brosay menya
- Интро / Intro
- Вирус D / Virus D
- Аутро / Autro
- Я танцую / Ya tantsuyu
- Прости скорей / Prosti skorey
- Непогода / Nepogoda

=== 2002: Virus of Happiness ===
- 1 Интро / Intro
- 2 Счастье / Schast'e
- 3 Без тебя / Bez tebya
- 4 Я знаю / Ya znayu
- 5 Подари мне / Podari mne
- 6 Вирус е / Virus e
- 7 Детские слезы / Detskie slezy
- 8 Корабли / Korabli
- 9 Не попрошу / Ne poproshu
- 10 Попрошу (remix) / Poproshu (remix)
- 11 Счастье (remix) / Schast'e (remix)

=== 2003: Bratishka (Little Brother) ===
- 1 Братишка / Bratishka
- 2 Прогульщица / Progul'shchitsa
- 3 Лишь о тебе / Lish' o tebe
- 4 Города / Goroda
- 5 День рожденья / Den' rozhden'ya
- 6 Не нужен мне / Ne nuzhen mne
- 7 Фотография / Fotografiya
- 8 Непослушная / Neposlushnaya
- 9 Не понимаю / Ne ponimayu
- 10 Лучшая подруга / Luchshaya podruga
- 11 Не грусти / Ne grusti
- 12 Наоборот / Naoborot
- 13 Без тебя (ремикс) / Bez tebya (remiks)
- 14 Вирус F / Virus F

=== 2005: Moi Geroi (My Hero) ===
1. Одинокая / Odinokaya
2. Одна минута / Odna minuta
3. Даже не думай / Dazhe ne dumay
4. Лето / Leto
5. Не могу без тебя / Ne mogu bez tebya
6. Футбол / Futbol
7. Подожди / Podozhdi
8. Weekend
9. Лето (HOT mix) / Leto (HOT mix)
10. Мой герой / Moy geroy
11. Ты меня не ищи '04 / Ty menya ne ishchi '04
12. Иван (feat. Цветкоff) / Ivan (feat. Tsvetkoff)
13. Не лечи / Ne lechi
14. Тайна / Tayna
