= Natasha Korolyova =

Ukrainian-born Russian singer (born 1973)

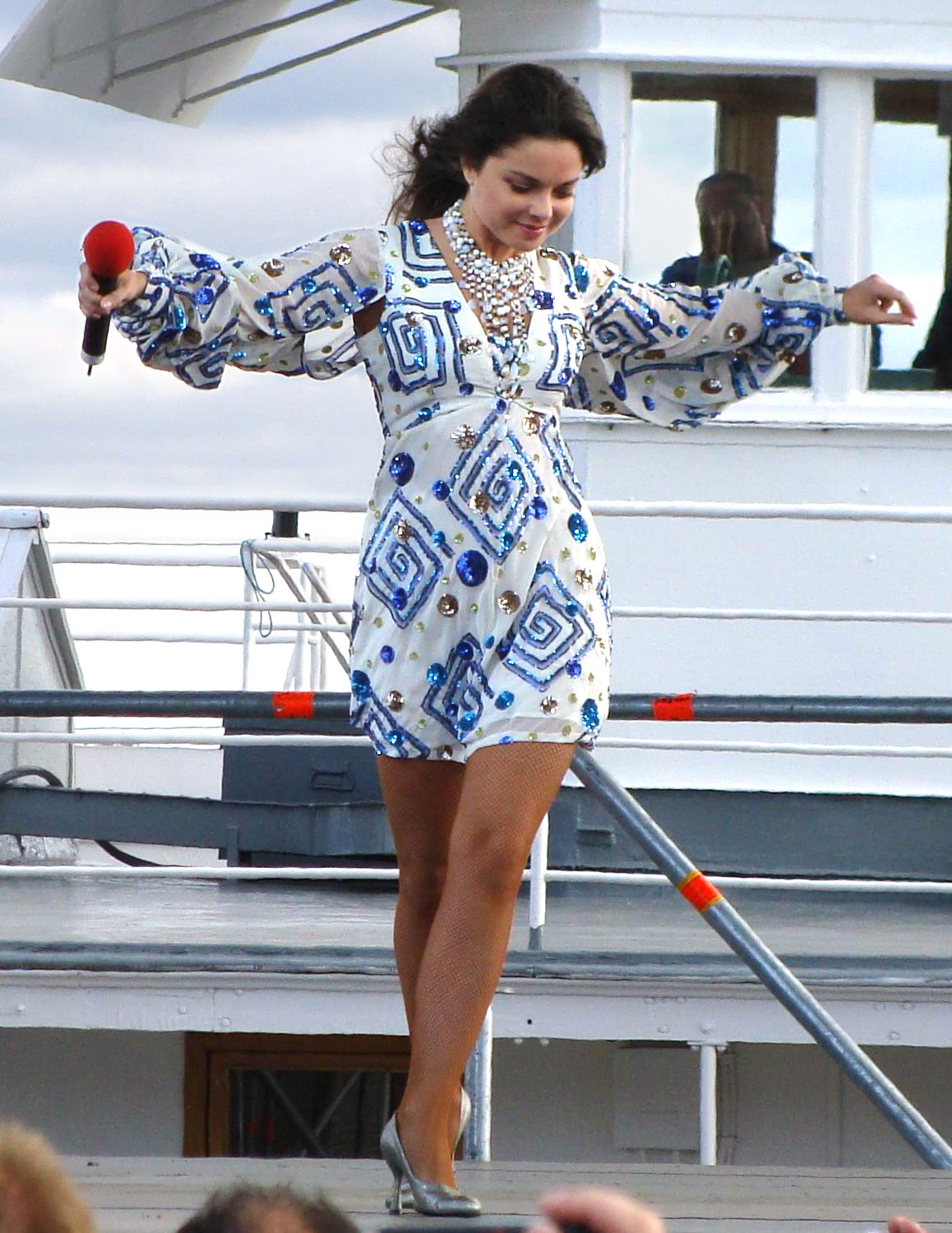
- Natasha Korolyova in Arhangelsk

Background information
- Born: Natalia Vladimirovna Poryvay; 31 May 1973 (age 53); Kyiv, Ukrainian SSR, Soviet Union (now Ukraine)
- Genre: Pop
- Occupations: singer; actress
- Years active: 1985–present
- Website: koroleva.ru

Natalia Vladimirovna Poryvay (Russian: Ната́лия Влади́мировна Порыва́й; Ukrainian: Наталія Володимирівна Порива́й, romanized: Nataliia Volodymyrivna Poryvai; born 31 May 1973), known professionally as Natasha Korolyova (Russian: Наташа Королёва), is a Soviet (Note: According to a 2018 Supreme Court of Ukraine verdict, Korolyova does not hold Ukrainian citizenship.) singer of popular music. She was named a Meritorious Artist of Russia in 2004.

== Early career ==
Korolyova was born in the Ukrainian capital, Kyiv. She gave her first public performance in 1976, at the age of three, singing "The Cruiser Aurora" at the annual congress of the Komsomol. In 1985, aged twelve, she recorded several songs, including "World Without Miracles" and "Where Went the Circus", which achieved popular success in Ukraine. In 1987, Korolyova won the Golden Kamerton music prize. From 1988 to 1991, she studied vocal performance at the Kyiv Circus and Pop School.

Korolyova made her first international appearances in the United States in 1989. Shortly thereafter, she moved to Moscow. She took part in numerous competitions and television broadcasts, among them Christmas Meeting and Morning Mail. In 1990, she recorded the song "Yellow Tulips", which launched her success both within the USSR and internationally. The song reached the final of the Pesnya goda festival.

In 1992, Korolyova embarked on her first concert tour of Russia, concluding with major shows at the Olympic Stadium. She toured Israel in 1993, Germany in 1994, and performed in New York City in 1997.

=== Family ===
Natasha Korolyova has a sister, Russya, who is also a successful Ukrainian singer. Her first husband was the Russian pop singer-songwriter Igor Nikolayev. Since 2003, she has been married to Sergei Glushko, who performs as a male stripper under the name "Tarzan". They have a son, Arkhip.

== Mainstream success ==
Between 1990 and 1997, Korolyova made twelve music videos for television: "Yellow Tulips" (directed by Mogilevskaya, 1990), "First Kiss" (directed by Pesotsky), "Under the Summer Rain" (directed by Vladimirov), "Why the Love Dies" (directed by Pesotsky), "Kyiv Boy" (directed by Pesotsky, 1993), "Sunflowers" (Fix, 1995), "Is It Me?" (Fix), "Small Country" (Gusev), "The Man With Bellows" (Fix, 1996), "Do Not Die" (Gavrilov), "Summer Castanets" (Nikolayev, 1997) and "Diamonds of Tears" (Bazhenov).

Following her divorce from Igor Nikolayev, she released the albums Fragments of the Past, Heart, Believe It or Not and Paradise, Where Are You.

She has hosted and moderated a variety of television programmes and concerts, and has taken part in the television shows Dancing with the Stars (in both Russia and Ukraine) and Two Stars. Her second husband, Sergey Glushko, better known as the male stripper Tarzan, was her partner on these projects.

Korolyova has appeared in several film roles, including Recipe Witch and The Cheerful Family 2, the latter produced for Ukrainian television. She has also designed jewellery, releasing a collection entitled Daughters-Mothers in 2008. In 2009, she published the novel Male Striptease.

In 2018, Korolyova was barred from entering Ukraine for three years on the grounds of "committing illegal acts related to encroachment on the territorial integrity of Ukraine. Using the media, she supports the actions of the Russian Federation on the annexation of Crimea". Crimea is currently under dispute between Russia and Ukraine. Korolyova lost a 2018 appeal at the Supreme Court of Ukraine; the verdict referred to her as "a foreigner".

== Discography ==
=== Studio albums ===
1. 1991– Zhyoltye tyul'pany (Yellow Tulips)
2. 1992 – Del'fin i rusalka (Dolphin and the Mermaid), with Igor Nikolayev
3. 1993 – Poklonnik (Admirer)
4. 1995 – Konfetti (Confetti)
5. 1997 – Бриллианты Слёз (Diamonds Tears)
6. 2001 – Serdtse (Heart)
7. 2003 – Веришь Или Нет (Do You Trust Me or Not), with Tarzan
8. 2006 – Рай Там, Где Ты... (Paradise Is Where You Are)
9. 2015 – Магия Л... (Magic L' )
10. 2016 – Магия Л... переиздание (Magic L' revised)
11. 2019 – Ягодка (Berry)
