= Bely Oryol =

Music band

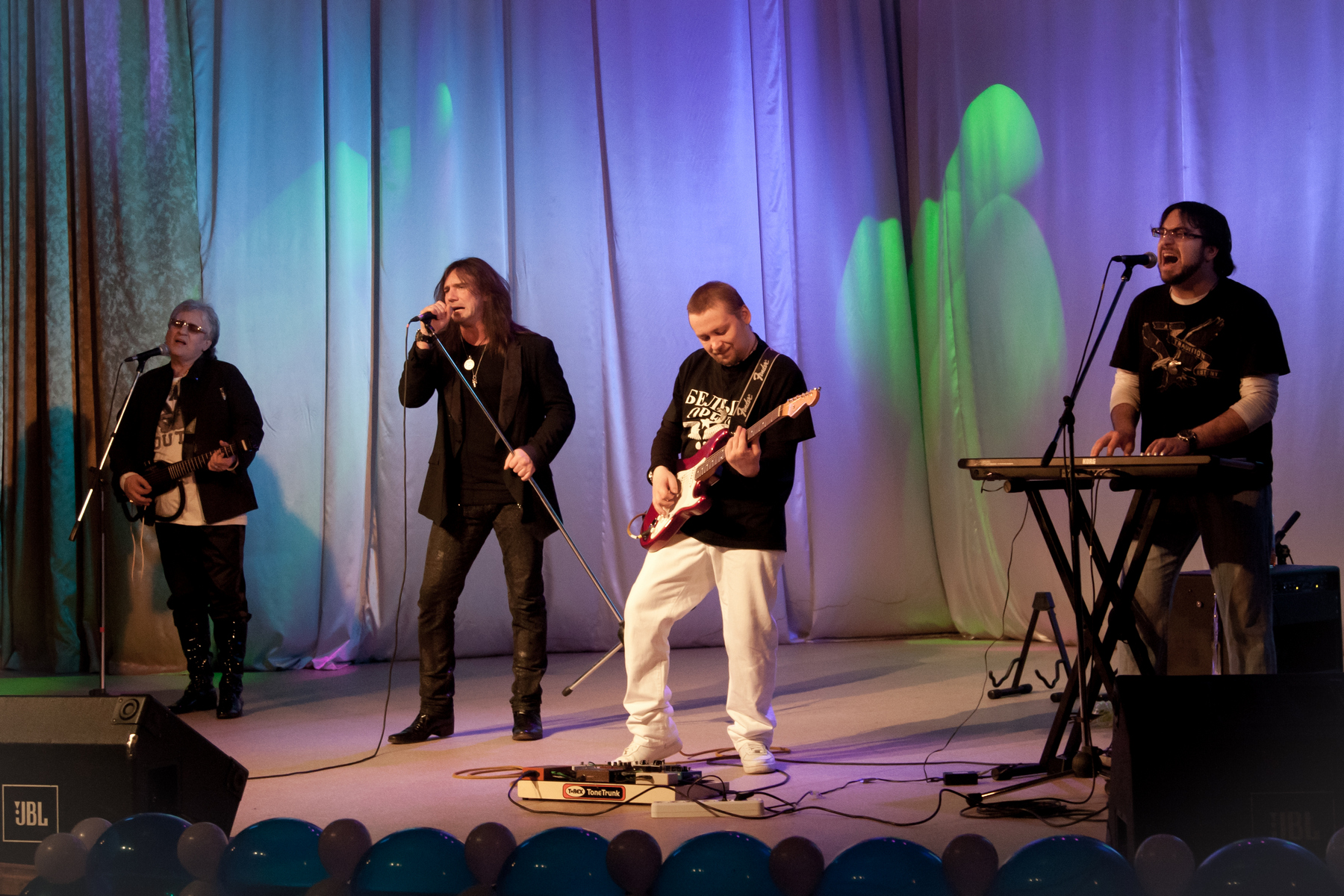
- Concert in Severodvinsk

Background information
- Origin: Russia
- Genres: russian chanson, Pop rock
- Years active: 1996–present
- Members: Denis Kasyakin; Alexander Ilchuk; Leonid Grevnov; Iluya Petrov; Mirza Mirzoyev; Alexander Lensky; Ruslan Jackaite
- Website: www.w-eagle.ru

Bely Oryol (Russian: Белый орёл, lit. White Eagle) is a Russian musical band founded in 1996 by a businessman Vladimir Zhechkov. 2001 single of Bely Oryol,

== Videos ==
1. 1997 — «Я тебя теряю»
2. 1997 — «А я тебя помню»
3. 1998 — «Потому что нельзя»
4. 1998 — «Как упоительны в России вечера»
5. 1998 — «Моя любовь — воздушный шар»
6. 1998 — «Я по тебе скучаю»
7. 1998 — «Я куплю тебе новую жизнь»
8. 1999 — «Боже»
9. 1999 — «С высоких гор»
10. 2000 — «Без тебя»
11. 2000 — «Добрый вечер, скажу я, мисс»
12. 2001 — «Пташечка»
13. 2007 — «Я один и ты одна»
14. 2008 — «Неповторимая»
