= Elena Korikova =

Russian theater and television actress

- Born: Elena Yuryevna Korikova; Tobolsk, Russian SFSR, Soviet Union
- Occupation: Actress
- Years active: 1990–present
- Height: 1.6 m (5 ft 3 in)

Elena Yuryevna Korikova (Russian: Еле́на Ю́рьевна Ко́рикова) is a Russian theater and television actress. She is known for her role of Anna Platonova in the television series Bednaya Nastya.

== Biography ==
Korikova was born in Tobolsk, Russian SFSR, Soviet Union. As a schoolgirl, she attended classes at the historic Epic heater studio in Rostov-on-Don, created by director Mikhail Viktorovich Izyumsky and Elena Prozorovskaya (Izyum). Her mother sewed her dresses.

After high school, she went to Moscow to act, successfully passed the exams, and was admitted to Gerasimov Institute of Cinematography (VGIK), in the workshop of Sergei Solovyov.

Korikova started acting in films. Her first role was a young Masha in the tale of Anatoly Mateshko "Kha-bee-ass-see" (1990). Valeri Ahadov's melodrama, I Promised, I Am Leaving (1992) played a young provincial Irina. In Dmitry Dolinin's drama "Golden Ring, a bouquet of red roses" (1994), based on Anton Chekhov's story "In the Ravine", she plays a quiet, frightened Lipu. She also starred in the historical and romantic melodrama, Viktor Titov's Damned Dyoran (1994), and in Sergei Solovyov's drama "Three Sisters" (1994).

For the role of Lisa in the film by Alexei Sakharov "The Aristocratic Peasant Girl" (1995), based on the novel by Alexander Pushkin, Korikova won the prize for Best Actress at the Kinoshock film festival, and also won the "Nika Award".

In 1995 she graduated from VGIK.

In the summer of 1998, she moved with her family to New York City, where she tried her hand as a model and actress.

Returning to Russia, Korikova received an offer from Mr. Volchek to join the troupe of the theater "Sovremennik" and from 2001 to 2004 worked in the "Sovremennik". The repertoire of the actresses in the role of Pat's "Three Comrades" by EM Remarque, Irene in "Three Sisters" by Anton Chekhov, Nina in "Anfisa" by Leonid Andreyev, Dasha Shatov in "Possessed" by Fyodor Dostoyevsky.

In 2005 Korikova ranked second in the list of the "sexiest women in the world" by FHM magazine (Russian edition).

== Filmography ==
Year	Title	Original Title	Role	Notes
1990	Kha-bee-ass-see	Ха-би-ассы	Masha	
1992	I Promised, I Am Leaving	Я обещала, я уйду	Irina	
1994	Damned Dyoran	Проклятие Дюран	Zheneveva	TV series
1994	Three Sisters	Три сестры	Irina	
1994	Golden Ring, a bouquet of red roses	Колечко золотое, букет из алых роз	Lipa	
1995	The Aristocratic Peasant Girl	Барышня-крестьянка	Liza Muromskaya	
1997	A Friend of the Deceased	Приятель покойника	Marina	
1998	Mu-mu	Му-му	Tatyana	
1999	Alice Underground	Алиса в подземелье	Alice	
2000	Black Room	Черная комната	Tanya	TV series
2001	Hipnosy	Гипноз		
2003-04	Poor Nastya	Бедная Настя	Anna Platonova	TV series
2004	Spy Games: Undercover	Шпионские игры: Нелегал	Ekaterina Matveeva	TV
2006	Spy Games: Trap for the sage - 2	Шпионские игры: Ловушка для мудреца	Ekaterina Matveeva	TV
2006	Children of Captain	Капитанские дети	Zhenya Stephens	TV series
2007	Velocity	Скорость		
2008	Traffic Jam	Пробка		
2008	Champion	Чемпион	Kristina Lomova	TV series
2010	Cranking	Раскрутка	Valentina Dunayeva	TV series
2011	Complex usefulness	Комплекс полноценности	Jeanne	TV
2011	Kiss of Socrates	Поцелуй Сократа	Lika Vronskaya	TV series
2012	Moms	Мамы	Oksana	
2013	Women on the Verge	Женщины на грани	Margarita Petrovna Shnyreva	TV series
2014	Curiosities	Неформат	Ekaterina Lipskaya	TV series
2014	Threads of Love	Нити любви	Khadomskaya	Miniseries
2014	Year in Tuscany	Год в Тоскане	Jana	TV series
2015	Syndrome understatement	Синдром недосказанности		Miniseries
2015	Bad Influence	Дурное влияние	Sofia	

== Discography ==
Year	Title	Featured Artist	Album	Russia
2008	"Плохая девочка"	Vintage	HAH	1

== Awards and nominations ==
Year	Award	Category	Project	Result
1996	Nika Awards	Best Actress	The Aristocratic Peasant Girl	Nominated
