= Alla Pugacheva discography =

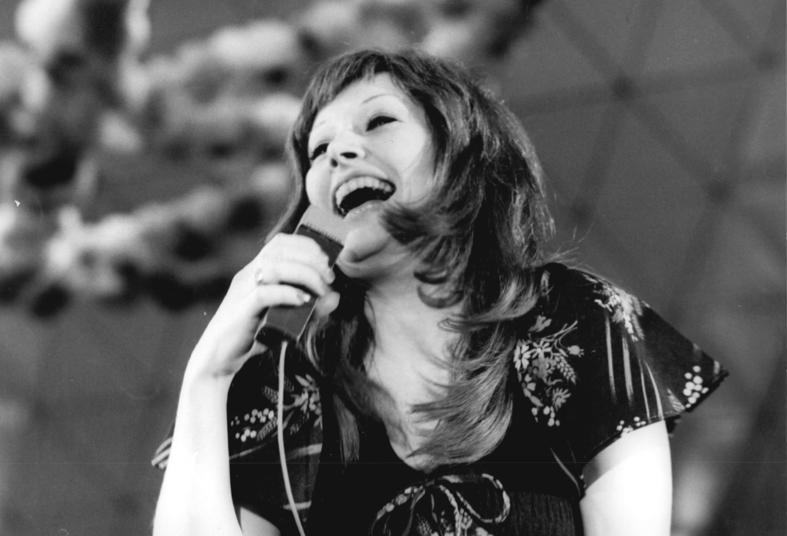
- Alla Pugacheva in Berlin is taking part in a concert to celebrate the opening of the Palace of the Republic GDR, 28 April 1976
- Studio albums: 17
- Live albums: 3
- Compilation albums: 33
- Singles: 42

The discography of the Soviet and Russian singer Alla Pugacheva includes 100 records, compact cassettes, CDs and DVDs, including 17 studio albums, 3 live albums, 33 compilations and 42 singles. In total, she has sold more than 250 million records. Her debut album Zerkalo dushi sold 10 million copies (including reissues), and the single "Arlekino" sold 14 million copies; her other albums and singles were also successful.

== Albums ==
=== Studio albums ===
Title	Album details	Peak chart positions		Sales	Certifications
Title	Album details	USSR	RUS	Sales	Certifications
Zerkalo dushi	Released: 1978; Label: Melodiya; Formats: LP, cassette, digital download	1	*	WW: 10,000,000	
Arlekino i drugiye	Released: 1979; Label: Melodiya; Formats: LP, digital download	—	*		
Podnimis nad suyetoy!	Released: November 1980; Label: Melodiya; Formats: LP, digital download	1	*		
To li eshchyo budet...	Released: December 1980; Label: Melodiya; Formats: LP, digital download	8	*	USSR: 2,200,000	
Kak trevozhen etot put	Released: September 1982; Label: Melodiya; Formats: LP, cassette, digital download	1	*	USSR: 7,000,000	
Akh, kak khochetsya zhit	Released: 1985 (Bulgaria); Labels: Melodiya, Balkanton; Formats: LP, cassette, digital download	—	*		
Watch Out / Alla Pugacheva v Stokgolme	Released: 1985 (Sweden) / 1986; Label: World Record Music / Melodiya; Formats: LP, cassette, digital download	—	*	WW: 3,200,000	
...Schastya v lichnoy zhizni!	Released: February 1986; Label: Melodiya; Formats: LP, digital download	2	*		
Prishla i govoryu	Released: November 1987; Label: Melodiya; Formats: LP, cassette, digital download	4	*	USSR: 200,000	
Pesni vmesto pisem (with Udo Lindenberg)	Released: 18 July 1988; Label: Melodiya, Polydor; Formats: LP	5	*		
Alla	Released: 1990; Label: Melodiya; Formats: CD, LP, cassette	—	*		
Ne delayte mne bolno, gospoda	Released: 15 December 1995; Label: Soyuz; Formats: CD, cassette, digital download	*	10		
Da!	Released: 1998; Label: Extraphone; Formats: CD, cassette, digital download	*	—		
Rechnoy tramvaychik	Released: 7 November 2001; Label: Art-studiya "Alla"; Formats: CD, cassette, digital download	*	1		
A byl li malchik? (with Lyubasha)	Released: April 2002; Label: Art-studiya "Alla"; Formats: CD, cassette, digital download	*	4		
Zhivi spokoyno, strana!	Released: December 2004; Label: Monolit; Formats: CD, cassette, digital download	*	—		NFPF: Gold
Priglasheniye na zakat	Released: 15 April 2008; Label: RKF "Dolgi nashi"; Formats: CD, cassette, digital download	*	1	CIS: 500,000	NFPF: Gold
"—" denotes items which were not released in that country or failed to chart. "*" denotes the chart did not exist at that time.

=== Live albums ===
Title	Album details	Sales
Zlatniyat Orfey '76 (with Vesyolye Rebyata)	Released: 1976 (Bulgaria); Label: Balkanton; Formats: LP	WW: 12,890,000
Izbrannoye. Live Concert	Released: 1999; Label: Art-studiya "Alla"; Formats: CD, cassette, digital download	
P.S.	Released: 1 March 2024; Formats: Digital download	

=== Compilation albums ===
Title	Album details	Peak chart positions		Sales	Certifications
Title	Album details	RUS	FIN	Sales	Certifications
Alla Pugacheva	Released: 1978 (Japan); Label: Victor; Formats: LP	*	—		
Alla Pugacheva – Joseph Kobzon (with Joseph Kobzon)	Released: 1979 (Bulgaria, USSR); Label: Melodiya, Balkanton; Formats: LP	*	—		
Alla Pugacheva	Released: 1980; Label: Melodiya; Formats: Cassette	*	—		
Poyot Alla Pugacheva	Released: 1980; Label: Melodiya; Formats: LP	*	—	USSR: 40,000	
Huipulla	Released: 1980 (Finland); Label: Kansankulttuuri Oy, Melodiya; Formats: LP, cassette	*	—		
Tahtikesa	Released: 1981 (Finland); Label: Kansankulttuuri Oy; Formats: LP, cassette	*	—		
百万本のバラ (Million Roz)	Released: 1983 (Japan); Label: Victor; Formats: LP, CD, cassette, digital download	*	—		
Dávná Píseň	Released: 1984 (Czechoslovakia); Label: Supraphon; Formats: LP	*	—		
Soviet Superstar	Released: 1984 (Sweden); Label: Track Music; Formats: LP	*	2		Musiikkituottajat: Gold
Soviet Superstar Vol. 2	Released: 1985 (Finland); Label: K-tel; Formats: LP, cassette	*	—		
Otrazheniye v vode	Released: 1986; Label: Melodiya; Formats: Cassette	*	—		
Top Hits of Alla Pugacheva	Released: 1988; Label: Melodiya; Formats: Cassette	*	—		
Rozhdestvenskiye vstrechi (with various artists)	Released: 1991; Label: Russian Disc; Formats: LP	4	—		
Rozhdestvenskiye vstrechi 2 (with various artists)	Released: 1992; Label: Russian Disc; Formats: LP	—	—		
Alla Pugacheva	Released: 1994 (Germany); Label: Solo Florentin; Formats: CD	—	—		
Molodoy chelovek, priglasite tantsevat	Released: 1994; Label: General Records; Formats: Cassette	—	—		
Veryu v tebya	Released: 1994; Label: Melodiya; Formats: CD, cassette	—	—		
Luchshiye pesni '90–'95	Released: 1995; Label: ZeKo Records; Formats: Cassette	—	—		
Put zvezdy	Released: 1995; Label: RDM; Formats: CD, cassette	—	—		
Kollektsiya: Po ostrym iglam yarkogo ognya; Akh, kak khochetsya zhit; I v etom vsya moya pechal; Tolko v kino; Eto zavtra, a segodnya...; Bilet na vcherashny spektakl; Vstrechi v puti; Na doroge ozhidany; Razmyshleniya u kamina; Eto bylo odnazhdy; Baryshnya s krestyanskoy zastavy; Alla Pugacheva v Stokgolme; Pesni na bis	Released: 1 October 1996; Label: General Records; Formats: Box set (13x CD, 13x cassette), digital download	—	—		
Aleksand Zatsepin. Poyot Alla Pugacheva	Released: 1996; Label: ProGram; Formats: CD	—	—		
Dve zvezdy (with Vladimir Kuzmin)	Released: 15 April 1997; Label: Soyuz; Formats: CD, cassette, digital download	—	—		
Monolog	Released: 1999; Label: Stereo & Video; Formats: CD	—	—		
Luchshiye pesni	Released: 2000; Label: Art-studiya "Alla"; Formats: CD, cassette	—	—		
Zolotyye pesni	Released: 2000; Label: Extraphone; Formats: CD, cassette, digital download	—	—		
Luchsheye	Released: 2001; Label: CD Land; Formats: CD, cassette	—	—		
V Rozhdestvenskikh vstrechakh XX veka (in three parts)	Released: 2001; Label: Grand Records; Formats: CD, cassette	—	—		
Grand Collection	Released: 2001; Label: Kvadro-Disk; Formats: CD, cassette	—	—		
Ptitsa pevchaya	Released: 2002; Label: Soyuz; Formats: CD, cassette	—	—		
Dve zvezdy (with Sofia Rotaru)	Released: 2006; Label: Extraphone; Formats: CD	—	—		
Pesni Igorya Nikolayeva	Released: 2009; Label: Kvadro-Disk; Formats: CD	—	—		
Alla Pugacheva poyot pesni Igorya Chernavskogo	Released: 2013; Label: MiruMir; Formats: LP	—	—		
"—" denotes items which were not released in that country or failed to chart. "*" denotes the chart did not exist at that time.

=== Video albums ===
Title	Album details
Ne delayte mne bolno, gospoda	Released: 1995; Label: Soyuz; Format: VHS
Izbrannoye	Released: 1999; Labels: Art-studiya "Alla", BS Graphics; Format: DVD
The Best Video – Videoklipy	Released: 2001; Labels: Art-studiya "Alla", Soyuz; Format: VHS

== EPs ==
Title	Album details
Eto lyubov (with Maxim Galkin)	Released: 2000; Label: Art-studiya "Alla"; Formats: CD, cassette

== Singles ==
Title	Single details	Sales
"Arlekino" b/w "Posidim, pookayem" / "Ty snishsya mne"	Released: 21 July 1975; Label: Melodiya	WW: 14,000,000
"Arlekino" b/w "Sunuvam te"	Released: 1975 (Bulgaria); Label: Balkanton	WW: 14,000,000
"Harlekino" b/w "Auch ohne Dich werde ich leben"	Released: 1976 (East Germany); Label: AMIGA	WW: 14,000,000
"Do svidanya, leto" / "Lyubov odna vinovata" b/w "Buben shamana"	Released: 1976; Label: Melodiya	
"Sto chasov schastya" / "22+28" b/w "Posredi zimy"	Released: 1977; Label: Melodiya	
"Etot mir" / "Ty ne stal sudboy" b/w "Da" / "Pesenka pro menya"	Released: 1978; Label: Melodiya	
"Leningrad" / "Muzykant" b/w "Chto ne mozhet sdelat atom" / "Vot tak sluchilos, mama"	Released: September 1980; Label: Melodiya	
"Eti letniye dozhdi" b/w "Skazhi mne chto-nibud"	Released: 1980; Label: Melodiya	
"Maestro" b/w "Papa kupil avtomobil" / "Tri zhelanya"	Released: June 1981; Label: Melodiya; Format: Flexi disc	USSR: 2,600,000
"Maestro" b/w "Dezhurny angel"	Released: July 1981; Label: Melodiya; Format: 7"	USSR: 2,600,000
"Dezhurny angel" b/w "Lestnitsa"	Released: August 1981; Label: Melodiya	
"Ya bolshe ne revnuyu" b/w "Beda"	Released: 1982; Label: Melodiya	
"Million alykh roz" b/w "Vozvrashcheniye"	Released: December 1982; Label: Melodiya	
"Chudesa" / "Kabriolet" (with Igor Kio) b/w "Kanatokhodka"	Released: 1983; Label: Melodiya	
百万本のバラ ("Milion roz") b/w 想い出の古時計 ("Starinnyye chasy")	Released: 1983 (Japan); Label: Victor	
"Tsygansky khor" b/w "Kanatokhodka"	Released: 1983; Label: Melodiya	USSR: 6,000,000
"Na doroge ozhidniy" b/w "Ty na svete yest"	Released: 1983; Label: Melodiya	
"Sonet" b/w "Bumazhny zmey"	Released: 1984; Label: Melodiya	
"Living My Life" b/w "Millions of Roses"	Released: 1984 (Sweden); Label: Track Music	
"Harlequin" b/w "The Old Clock"	Released: 1984 (Sweden); Label: Track Music	
"Lousy Party" b/w "Sacred Lie"	Released: 1985 (Sweden); Label: Track Music	
"Rasskazhite, ptitsy" b/w "Aysberg"	Released: 1985; Label: Melodiya	
"Delu vremya" / "Bez menya" b/w "I v etom vsya moya vina"	Released: 1985; Label: Melodiya	
"Superman" b/w "Every Night and Every Day"	Released: 1985 (Sweden); Label: World Record Music	
"Belaya dver" b/w "Otrazheniye v vode"	Released: 1985; Label: Melodiya	
"Paromshchik" b/w "Balalaika"	Released: 1986; Label: Melodiya	
"Sto druzey" b/w "Dve zvezdy" (with Vladimir Kuzmin)	Released: 1986; Label: Melodiya	
"Okraina" b/w "Ivan Ivanovich"	Released: 1987; Label: Melodiya	
"Allo" b/w "Koroleva"	Released: 1988; Label: Melodiya	
"Primadonna": "Primadonna"; "Primadonna" (English vrs.); "Diva Prima Donna" (French vrs.)	Released: 1997; Label: Sintez Records; Format: CD	
"Bely sneg": "Ostorozhno, listopad"; "Ne sgoryu"; "Bely sneg"; "Nepogoda"	Released: 5 February 2000; Label: Art-studiya "Alla"; Format: CD, cassette	
"Madame Broshkina"	Released: 21 August 2000; Label: Art-studiya "Alla"; Format: CD, cassette	
"Vot i vsyo"	Released: 7 January 2013; Format: Digital download	
"Tyanet serdtse ruki"	Released: 21 December 2015; Label: United Music Group; Format: Digital download	
"Ne zvoni"	Released: 18 October 2016; Label: United Music Group; Format: Digital download	
"Ya letala"	Released: 30 December 2017; Format: Digital download	
"Ne bespokoysya za menya"	Released: 15 March 2024; Format: Digital download	
"Beregi" (with Zhenya Moiseyev)	Released: 29 March 2024; Format: Digital download	
"Ya plachu"	Released: 14 April 2024; Format: Digital download	
"Zhizn slishkom khorosha"	Released: 15 April 2024; Format: Digital download	
"lozhny styd"	Released: 21 May 2024; Format: Digital download	
"Ne vysovyvaysya, dochka"	Released: 31 May 2024; Format: Digital download	

== Charted songs ==
=== 1977–1991 ===
Year	Single	Peak chart positions		Album
Year	Single	USSR	FIN	Album
1977	"Ne otrekayutsya lyubya"	1	—	Zerkalo dushi
1977	"Volshebnik-nedouchka"	9	—	Zerkalo dushi
1978	"Vsyo mogut koroli"	5	—	Zerkalo dushi
1978	"Pesenka pro menya"	1	—	Zerkalo dushi
1978	"Sonet Shekspira"	4	—	Zerkalo dushi
1978	"Priyezhay"	5	—	Zerkalo dushi
1978	"Ty vozmi menya s soboy"	3	—	To li eshchyo budet...
1978	"Etot mir"	6	—	To li eshchyo budet...
1979	"Pesenka pervoklassnika"	14	—	To li eshchyo budet...
1979	"Podnimis nad suyetoy"	1	—	Podnimis nad suyetoy!
1979	"Ety letniye dozhdi"	4	—	To li eshchyo budet...
1980	"Uletay, tucha"	9	—	To li eshchyo budet...
1980	"Moskovsky roman"	1	—	Non-album songs
1980	"Kogda ya uydu"	3	—	Non-album songs
1980	"Ukhodya, ukhodi"	3	—	Non-album songs
1980	"Stary dom"	8	—	Kak trevozhen etot put
1980	"Dezhurny angel"	2	—	Kak trevozhen etot put
1981	"Maestro"	1	—	Kak trevozhen etot put
1981	"Muzykant"	4	—	Podnimis nad suyetoy!
1981	"Leningrad"	5	—	Podnimis nad suyetoy!
1981	"Pesnya na bis"	1	—	Kak trevozhen etot put
1981	"Lestnitsa"	13	—	Kak trevozhen etot put
1981	"Beda"	3	—	Kak trevozhen etot put
1981	"Derzhi minya, solominka"	10	—	Kak trevozhen etot put
1982	"Starinnye chasy"	2	—	Kak trevozhen etot put
1982	"Vozvrashcheniye"	5	—	Non-album song
1984	"Milion roz"	—	14	Akh, kak khochetsya zhit
1985	"Robinzon"	2	—	Non-album songs
1985	"Gody moi"	3	—	Non-album songs
1986	"Balet"	2	—	...Schastya v lichnoy zhizni!
1986	"Prosti, pover"	1	—	...Schastya v lichnoy zhizni!
1986	"Balalaika"	2	—	
1986	"Sto druzey"	4	—	
1986	"Belaya panama"	2	—	Non-album song
1986	"Steklyannyye tsvety"	1	—	...Schastya v lichnoy zhizni!
1986	"Nado zhe..."	1	—	Non-album song
1987	"Dve zvezdy" (with Vladimir Kuzmin)	4	—	...Schastya v lichnoy zhizni!
1987	"Belyye tsvety"	11	—	Prishla i govoryu
1987	"Krysolov"	9	—	Non-album song
1987	"Allo! Allo!"	1	—	Pesni vmesto pisem
1987	"Koroleva"	2	—	Non-album song
1987	"Nayti menya"	10	—	Prishla i govoryu
1988	"Sberegi tebya sudba"	13	—	Pesni vmesto pisem
1988	"Ptitsa pevchaya"	3	—	Pesni vmesto pisem
1988	"Uvazhayemy avtor"	14	—	Non-album songs
1988	"Mestny kazanova"	6	—	Non-album songs
1989	"Bros sigaretu"	14	—	Alla
1989	"Ya tebya potselovala"	9	—	Alla
1990	"Priglasite damu tantsevat"	5	—	Alla
1991	"Ozero nadezhdy"	2	—	Rozhdestvenskiye vstrechi
1991	"Kristian"	16	—	Rozhdestvenskiye vstrechi
"—" denotes items which were not released in that country or failed to chart.

=== 1992–2017 ===
Year	Single	Peak chart positions				Album
Year	Single	RUS ZD	RUS TH	CIS	UKR	Album
1992	"Beglets"	4	*	*	*	Rozhdestvenskiye vstrechi
1992	"Osenny potseluy"	1	*	*	*	Non-album songs
1993	"Sygrayem v lyubov"	12	*	*	*	Non-album songs
1993	"Ne otrekayutsya lyubya"	12	*	*	*	Non-album songs
1994	"Ty khochesh, chtoby ya skazala 'Da'"	3	*	*	*	Ne delayte mne bolno, gospoda
1994	"Silnaya zhenshchina"	4	*	*	*	Ne delayte mne bolno, gospoda
1995	"Bessonnitsa"	1	*	*	*	Ne delayte mne bolno, gospoda
1995	"Ne delayte mne bolno, gospoda"	7	*	*	*	Ne delayte mne bolno, gospoda
1995	"Grabitel"	5	*	*	*	Ne delayte mne bolno, gospoda
1996	"Meri"	3	*	*	*	Ne delayte mne bolno, gospoda
1997	"Pozovi menya s soboy"	1	*	*	*	Da!
1998	"V vodu voydu"	5	*	*	*	Da!
1998	"Gde-to"	8	*	*	*	Non-album song
1998	"Mal-pomalu"	13	*	*	*	Da!
1999	"Ostorozhno, listopad"	2	*	*	*	Rechnoy tramvaychik
2000	"Nepogoda"	4	*	*	*	Rechnoy tramvaychik
2000	"Madame Broshkina"	4	*	*	*	Rechnoy tramvaychik
2001	"Svecha gorela"	17	*	*	*	Rechnoy tramvaychik
2001	"Rechnoy tramvaychik"	4	*	*	*	Rechnoy tramvaychik
2002	"Bud ili ne bud"	8	*	*	*	Rechnoy tramvaychik
2004	"Sumasshedshaya semeyka" (with Verka Serduchka)	—	—	11	4	Za dvumya zaytsami
2004	"Kafeshka" (with Maxim Galkin)	—	6	1	6	Non-album songs
2005	"Zvezda"	—	25	25	42	Non-album songs
2005	"Lyubov kak sostoyaniye" (with Maxim Galkin)	—	12	10	29	Priglasheniye na zakat
2006	"Gadalka"	—	—	179	—	Non-album song
2006	"Zdes my dolgo"	—	8	10	1	Priglasheniye na zakat
2006	"Priglasheniye na zakat"	—	20	20	9	Priglasheniye na zakat
2006	"Kholodno v gorode" (with Philipp Kirkorov)	—	6	11	1	Priglasheniye na zakat
2008	"Opyat metel" (with Kristina Orbakaitė)	—	36	28	10	Priglasheniye na zakat
2008	"Ty tam, a ya tam"	—	28	27	1	Priglasheniye na zakat
2008	"Prosti, malchishka"	—	68	93	38	Non-album songs
2008	"Gromootvody" (with Maxim Galkin)	—	12	25	39	Non-album songs
2009	"Davay druzhit" (with Nikolay Baskov)	—	83	101	85	Non-album songs
2010	"Po doroge k solntsu"	—	68	129	49	Non-album songs
2011	"Sneg"	—	45	29	35	Non-album songs
2014	"Nas byut, my letayem"	—	53	24	6	Non-album songs
2014	"Ya smogu"	—	45	35	—	Non-album songs
2015	"Voyna"	—	—	174	70	Non-album songs
2015	"Tyanet serdtse ruki"	—	82	61	—	Non-album songs
2016	"Pod odnim flagom"	—	62	59	—	Non-album songs
2016	"Ne zvoni"	—	57	32	—	Non-album songs
2017	"Schastlivyye dni"	—	—	129	—	Non-album songs
2018	"Ya letala"	—	83	100	—	Non-album songs
"—" denotes items which were not released in that country or failed to chart. "*" denotes the chart did not exist at that time.

== Bibliography ==
- Razzakov, Fyodor (2003). Алла Пугачёва: По ступеням славы [Alla Pugacheva: On the steps of glory] (in Russian). Moscow: Eksmo. ISBN 5-8153-0059-4.
