= Soviet Superstar =

Greatest hits album by Alla Pugacheva
- Released: 1984
- Recorded: 1976–1984
- Genre: Pop
- Language: Russian
- Label: Track Music

Alla Pugacheva chronology
Kak trevozhen etot put (1982)	Soviet Superstar (1984)	Akh, kak khochetsya zhit (1985)

Singles from Soviet Superstar
- 1. "Living My Life"; 2. "Harlequin / The Old Clock"

Soviet Superstar is a greatest hits album by Russian singer Alla Pugacheva released in 1984 by Track Music in Scandinavia. The album features the best songs from 1976 to 1984. The release of the album was preceded by a number of concerts by Pugacheva in Sweden and Finland, as well as an active rotation of the singer's songs on radio and TV.

In Finland, the album reached the second place in the albums chart and received a gold certification. In 1985, the second part of the album was released.

== Track listing ==
Side A
No.	Title	Writer(s)	Length
1.	"Living My Life"	Diomid Kostyurin; Alla Pugacheva	3:30
2.	"Millions of Roses"	Andrei Voznesensky; Raimonds Pauls	5:30
3.	"Come Fly with Me"	Viktor Reznikov	6:20
4.	"No Fuss!"	Ilya Reznik; Pugacheva	4:20
5.	"Please Take Me with You"	Reznik; Eduard Khanok	2:50
6.	"The Old Clock"	Reznik; Pauls	4:40

Side B
No.	Title	Writer(s)	Length
1.	"I'm Not Jealous Anymore"	Osip Mandelstam; Pugacheva	5:15
2.	"Angel on Duty"	Reznik; Pugacheva	4:35
3.	"Hold Me"	Yevgeni Shilonsky; Pugacheva	4:20
4.	"Step by Step"	Reznik; Pugacheva	3:50
5.	"Harlequin"	Boris Barkas; Emil Dimitrov	4:30
6.	"I'm Gonna My Way Now, Mama"	Oleg Milyavsky; Pugacheva	3:40

== Charts ==
Chart (1984)	Peak position
Finnish Albums (Suomen virallinen lista)	2

== Bibliography ==
- Razzakov, Fyodor (2003). Алла Пугачёва: По ступеням славы [Alla Pugacheva: On the steps of glory] (in Russian). Moscow: Eksmo. ISBN 5-8153-0059-4.
