= Arlekino i drugiye =

1979 studio album by Alla Pugacheva

Studio album by Alla Pugacheva
- Released: May 1979
- Recorded: 1975–1976
- Genre: Pop
- Length: 32:26
- Language: Russian
- Label: Melodiya

Alla Pugacheva chronology
Zerkalo dushi (1978)	Arlekino i drugiye (1979)	Podnimis nad suyetoj! (1980)

Arlekino i drugiye (Russian: Арлекино и другие; transl. Harlequin and other songs) is the second studio album by Russian Soviet singer Alla Pugacheva released in 1979 by Melodiya.

== Background ==
After release of her debut album, Pugacheva's popularity gave her a chance to enter a solo career without participating in musical ensembles. In January 1979 the premiere of the singer's concert program "The Woman who Sings" took place at the Moscow variety theater. Before that, Pugacheva's concerts did not have a specific name, and the posters said "Alla Pugacheva Sings". In addition to Moscow in 1979, Pugacheva presented a new concert program in Chelyabinsk, Volgograd, Stavropol, Pyatigorsk, Kislovodsk, Sochi, Donetsk, Kharkov, Kiev, Moscow region cities, Leningrad, Simferopol, Yalta, Novosibirsk, Kemerovo, and Kostroma. During 1979 Pugacheva visited the GDR three times, where she performed in national concerts and popular TV programs. On 5 July 1979, in Moscow, she gave a joint concert with Joe Dassin on the occasion of the opening of the Olympic hotel "Cosmos". On 25 August 1979, Pugacheva as a guest of honor performed at the gala concert of the III international festival "Intervision-79" in Sopot (Poland).

On 5 March 1979, the film "The Woman who Sings" was released. The film attracted 54.9 million viewers and took the first place in the Soviet film distribution in 1979; Pugacheva was named "Best actress of the year" by the results of a survey by the magazine Soviet Screen. After its release, the film received a lot of reviews in the Soviet film press – positive and negative, and caused a storm of controversy in society, but not so much around itself as around the singer. Anyway, in the same year, on the wave of increased popularity of the singer, the decision to release a second solo album was made.

== Composition ==
The album was released by numerous requests of fans of Alla Pugacheva's work and includes songs previously released on minions and flexible records, recorded in 1975–1976 during the singer's work in VIA Vesyolye Rebyata. The album contains songs recorded for the film "The Irony of Fate" (1975), where Pugacheva acted as a voice-over performer (the voice of Barbara Brylska, who played the role of Nadya Sheveleva).

== Promotion ==
=== "Arlekino" ===
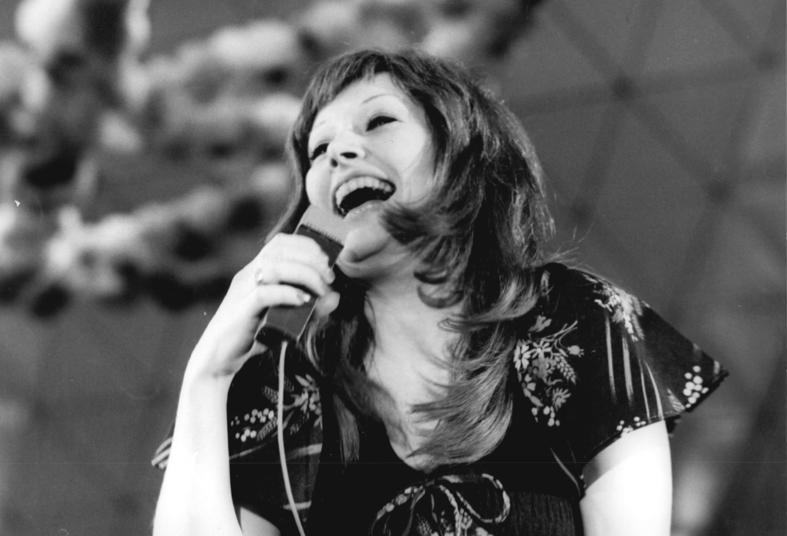
Alla Pugacheva in Berlin, 1976

The single "Arlekino" was released on 21 July 1975. This song became a turning point in the creative fate of the singer. Alla Pugacheva won the song contest "Golden Orpheus" in Bulgaria in 1975. The victory in the contest (which was shown by the Soviet Central television) brought Pugacheva not only wide all-Union fame, but also the first international success. In Bulgaria a single was released with a recording of a concert performance of the song, and later in the GDR, a recording of the song "Harlekino" was released in German. The solo career of Alla Pugacheva began with "Arlekino": before that, she worked as a vocalist of various musical groups.

In 1976, a music video for the song for the musical feature film "Ensemble of losers" was shot at the "Arbatskaya" metro station.

=== Performances ===
In 1976 Pugacheva became the first winner of the Pesnya goda festival. In the final concert she performed the song "Ochen khorosho". At the same time, in 1976, Pugacheva first took part in the new year's TV program "Little Blue Light", and not only as a performer, but also as a co-host of the program.

== Track listing ==
Side One
No.	Title	Lyrics	Music	Length
1.	"Ты снишься мне" ("Ty snishsya mne", eng. "You appear in my dreams")	Nikolay Shumakov	Alexey Mazhukov	3:44
2.	"22+28"	Vladimir Lugovoj	Vyacheslav Dobrynin	2:46
3.	"Ясные светлые глаза" ("Yasnye svetlye glaza", eng. "Clear bright eyes")	Vladimir lazarev	Robert Manukov	3:49
4.	"Посидим, поокаем" ("Posidim, pookayem", eng. "Let's Sit And Just Talk")	Ilya Reznik	Alexandr Muromtsev	3:25
5.	"Арлекино" ("Arlekino", eng. "Harlequin")	Boris Barkas	Emil Dimitrov; Pavel Slobodkin (reworking)	4:30

Side Two
No.	Title	Lyrics	Music	Length
6.	"Мне нравится" ("Mne nravitsya", eng. "The Things I Like")	Marina Tsvetaeva	Mikael Tariverdiev	1:34
7.	"У зеркала" ("U zerkala", eng. "By The Mirror")	Marina Tsvetaeva	Mikael Tariverdiev	1:36
8.	"По улице моей" ("Po ulitse moyej", eng. "In My Street")	Bella Akhmadulina	Mikael Tariverdiev	2:48
9.	"Посреди зимы" ("Posredi zimy", eng. "Amidst Winter")	Naum Olev	Pavel Slobodkin	5:58
10.	"Без тебя" ("Bez tebya", eng. "Without You")	Vladimir Kharitonov	Anatoly Dneprov	4:34
11.	"Очень хорошо" ("Ochen khorosho", eng. "Very Well"/)	David Usmanov	Alexey Mazhukov	3:21

== Personnel ==
Lead vocals

- Alla Pugacheva (track: 1–11)

Backing vocals

- Chorus of the Central television and all-Union radio of the USSR (track: 1)
- VIA "Vesyolye Rebyata" (track: 3, 5, 9, 11)
- Vocal trio "Vesna" (track: 10)

Accompaniment

- Variety and Symphony orchestra of the Central television and all-Union radio of the USSR (track: 1, 11)
- Instrumental ensemble "Melodyiya" (track: 2)
- VIA "Vesyolye Rebyata" (track: 1, 2, 3–5, 9, 11)
- Sergey Nikitin – guitar (track: 6–8)
- Variety orchestra "Sovremennik" (track: 10)

== Production ==
Arrangement

- Alexey Mazhukov (track: 1, 11)
- Alexey Zubov (track: 2)
- Valery Durandin (track: 3, 5)
- Vadim Golutvin (track: 4)
- Sergey Nikitin (track: 6–8)
- Pavel Slobodkin (track: 9)
- Anatoly Kroll (track: 10)

== Bibliography ==
- Razzakov F. (2003) [Алла Пугачёва: По ступеням славы]. Alla Pugacheva: On the steps of glory (PDF). Moscow: Eksmo. ISBN 5-8153-0059-4. Archived from the original (PDF) on 1 February 2014.
- Boris Savchenko (1992) [Дорогая Алла Борисовна...]. Dear Alla Borisovna... Moscow: Znaniye. p. 25.
