= Alla Budnitskaya =

Soviet and Russian actress

- Алла Будницкая
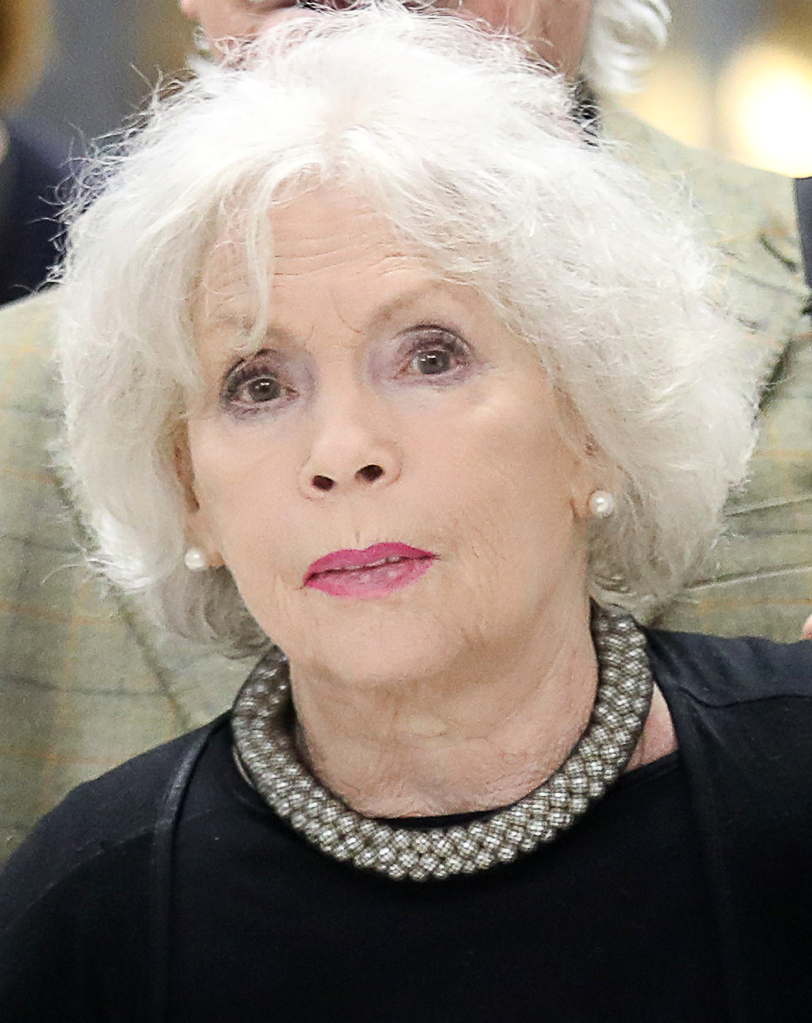
- Born: Alla Zinovievna Budnitskaya; 5 July 1937 (age 89); Moscow, Russian SFSR (now Russia)
- Occupation: Actress
- Years active: 1955-present

Alla Zinovievna Budnitskaya (Russian: Алла Зиновьевна Будницкая; born 1937, Moscow) is a Soviet and Russian actress of theater and cinema.

== Biography ==
Born July 5, 1937, in the family of the builder Zinovy Lazarevich Budnitsky.

After graduating from secondary school in 1954, she attempted to enter the Boris Shchukin Theatre Institute and VGIK, but failed to pass the qualifying rounds at either university. From 1954 she studied at the Institute of Foreign Languages, which she did not finish, because in 1957 she managed to get in VGIK. She studied with Grigory Kozintsev and graduated in 1962.

From 1964 to 2003 she was an actress of the National Film Actors' Theatre. In the cinema since 1960.

TV presenter, the author of programs on TNT, NTV, and REN TV.

== Personal life ==
He husband is Alexander Orlov, the film director. Foster daughter Daria Drozdovskaya, daughter of the tragically dead actress Mikaela Drozdovskaya (1937—1978).

== Selected filmography ==
- 1955: A Guest from Kuban (Russian: Гость с Кубани) as young collective farmer
- 1963: The Alive and the Dead (Живые и мертвые) as Masha's friend
- 1964: There Was an Old Couple (Жили-были старик со старухой) as fellow traveler
- 1969: King Stag (Король-олень) as Serendipist girl
- 1970: Sunflower (Подсолнухи) as bellhopper
- 1970: The Crown of the Russian Empire, or Once Again the Elusive Avengers (Корона Российской империи, или Снова неуловимые) as emotional lady
- 1972: Train Stop – Two Minutes (Стоянка поезда — две минуты) as Tamara Krasovskaya
- 1978: The Woman who Sings (Женщина, которая поёт) as Masha
- 1979: Nameless Star (Безымянная звезда) as Mrs. Ispas
- 1980: The Garage (Гараж) as secretary
- 1982: Station for Two (Вокзал для двоих) as Masha
- 1982: Simply Awful! (Просто ужас!) as Varvara Ivanovna
- 1988: Criminal Talent (Криминальный талант) as Ustyuzhanina
- 1989: A Bright Personality (Светлая личность) as guide
- 1993: The Secret of Queen Anne or Musketeers Thirty Years After (Тайна королевы Анны, или Мушкетёры тридцать лет спустя) as Duchess of Orleans
- 1994: La Piste du télégraphe as John's mother
