= Zhivi spokoyno, strana! =

Studio album by Alla Pugacheva
- Released: 2003
- Recorded: 1999–2003
- Genre: Pop
- Length: 1:15:16
- Label: Monolit
- Producer: Alla Pugacheva

Alla Pugacheva chronology
| Rechnoy tramvaychik (2001) | Zhivi spokoyno, strana! (2003) | Priglasheniye na zakat (2008) |

Singles from Zhivi spokoyno, strana!
- 1. "Eto lyubov" Released: 2002

Zhivi spokoyno, strana! (Russian: Живи спокойно, страна!; transl. Live calmly, country!) is a sixteenth studio album by Russian singer Alla Pugacheva released in 2003 by Monolit Records.

== Overview ==
The album includes songs from the singer's current repertoire; most of them, however, were released earlier. Some songs were released on the split album A byl li malchik? by Pugacheva and singer Lyubasha, some from the previous album Rechnoy tramvaychik, and the song "Every night and every day" is generally represented by the version of 1985, which was published on the albums Watch Out and Alla Pugacheva v Stokgolme.

The Album was released in two versions: a standard CD and a gift two-disc edition (on the second disc there were music videos for songs "Byt ili ne byt" and "Vodyanye da leshiye").

Ahead of the album's release, a split single by Alla Pugacheva and Maxim Galkin, "Eto lyubov" (2002), was released. It featuring three duet songs: "Bud ili ne bud", "Eto lyubov" and "Kholodno".

== Track listing ==
| No. | Title | Lyrics | Music | Length |
|---|---|---|---|---|
| 1. | "Ischeznet grust" | Vladislav Zabelin | Vladislav Zabelin | 3:45 |
| 2. | "Lyubov" | Alla Pugacheva | Alla Pugacheva | 4:37 |
| 3. | "Tolko ne nazad" | Oleg Popkov | Oleg Popkov | 3:36 |
| 4. | "Tysacha let" | Igor Nikolayev | Igor Krutoy | 4:23 |
| 5. | "Bud ili ne bud" (duet with Maxim Galkin) | Lyubasha | Lyubasha | 3:39 |
| 6. | "A-ada" | Lyubasha | Lyubasha | 3:15 |
| 7. | "Rechnoy tramvaychik" | Yevgeny Muravyov | Igor Krutoy | 3:23 |
| 8. | "Ne plach" | Lyubasha | Lyubasha | 3:56 |
| 9. | "Eto lyubov" (duet with Maxim Galkin) | Alla Pugacheva | Alla Pugacheva | 4:01 |
| 10. | "Zona" | Alla Pugacheva | Igor Krutoy | 3:55 |
| 11. | "Vse ushli v osen" | Lyubasha | Lyubasha | 1:59 |
| 12. | "Ya poyu" | Arkady Slavorosov | Aleksandr Barykin | 5:18 |
| 13. | "Kholodno" (duet with Maxim Galkin) | Oleg Popkov | Oleg Popkov | 3:09 |
| 14. | "Golova" | Lyubasha | Lyubasha | 3:55 |
| 15. | "Ne sgoryu" | Maria Gonchrova | Igor Kornilov | 4:15 |
| 16. | "Zakhodite gosti" | Yan Gelman | Alexandr Vengerov | 3:04 |
| 17. | "Vodyanye da leshiye" | karina Filippova | Alla Pugacheva | 3:30 |
| 18. | "Igra" | Tatyana Nazarova | Igor Krutoy | 4:50 |
| 19. | "Zhivi spokoyno, strana!" | Larisa Rubalskaya | Igor Krutoy | 2:41 |
| 20. | "Every night and every day" | Yakob Dalin | Alla Pugacheva | 3:57 |
| Total length: | | | | 75:08 |

== Sales and certifications ==
| Region | Certification | Certified units/sales |
|---|---|---|
| Russia (NFPF) | Gold | 50,000^{*} |
^{*} Sales figures based on certification alone.
