= Akh, kak khochetsya zhit =

1985 studio album by Alla Pugacheva

Studio album by Alla Pugacheva
- Released: 1985
- Recorded: 1982–1983
- Genre: Pop
- Length: 37:15
- Language: Russian
- Labels: Melodiya; Balkanton

Alla Pugacheva chronology
Kak trevozhen etot put (1982)	Akh, kak khochetsya zhit (1985)	Alla Pugacheva v Stokgolme (1985)

Akh, kak khochetsya zhit (Russian: Ах, как хочется жить; transl. Ah, How I Wish To Live) is the sixth studio album by Russian Soviet singer Alla Pugacheva released in 1985 jointly by Melodiya and Balkanton. In the USSR the album was released on cassette, the export version was released on LP.

== Overview ==
The song "Million roz", written by Andrey Voznesensky, became one of the most popular songs of the decade and firmly entered the repertoire of Alla Pugacheva. Since its premiere in the New Year's Attraction on January 2, 1983, almost no solo performance of the singer was complete without performing the song at the end of the concert, on "encore", often in a joint performance with the audience in the hall. In 1983, Alla Pugacheva with this song became the winner of the all-Union TV festival Pesnya goda.

The songs "Kanatokhodka" and "Tsygansky khor" were not recorded in the studio: they were made during the filming of the concert TV program "New year's attraction", held in the Circus on Tsvetnoy Boulevard in December 1982.

The song "Sonet" is written on sonnet 40 by William Shakespeare (translated by Samuil Marshak) for the film Love for Love. This is the second song on Shakespeare's poems in the work of Alla Pugacheva after the well-known "Sonet" performed in the film The Woman who Sings and included in the album Zerkalo dushi (1978). The song became the only example of the singer's collaboration with the composer Tikhon Khrennikov, the permanent head of the Union of composers of the USSR (that is, the actual head of all Soviet music), who rarely turned to the pop song genre. The musical film Love for Love was based on the Shakespearean comedy Much Ado About Nothing, and the main musical themes for the film were music from the ballet of the same name by Tikhon Khrennikov, created in 1976.

The song "Aysberg" was the first work of Pugacheva in collaboration with the composer Igor Nikolaev; this release was his debut.

== Track listing ==
Side One
No.	Title	Lyrics	Music	Length
1.	"Ах, как хочется жить" ("Akh, kak khochetsya zhit")	Dmitry Kostyurin	Alla Pugacheva	3:33
2.	"Жди и помни меня" ("Zhdi i pomni menya")	Ilya Reznik	Alla Pugacheva	4:36
3.	"Канатоходка" ("Kanatokhodka")	Ilya Reznik	Alla Pugacheva	5:52
4.	"Айсберг" ("Aysberg")	Lidiya Kozlova	Igor Nikolayev	4:25

Side Two
No.	Title	Lyrics	Music	Length
5.	"Миллион роз" ("Million roz")	Andrei Voznesensky	Raimonds Pauls	5:30
6.	"Старинные часы" ("Starinnye chasy")	Ilya Reznik	Raimonds Pauls	4:38
7.	"Цыганский хор" ("Tsygansky khor")	Ilya Reznik	Vladimir Shainsky	4:36
8.	"Сонет" ("Sonet")	William Shakespeare; Samuil Marshak (Russian translation)	Tikhon Khrennikov	4:05
