= Extraphone =

Russian record label

- Company type: Public
- Industry: Music & Entertainment
- Founded: 1995
- Headquarters: Moscow, Russia
- Website: extraphone.ru

Еxtraphone - trademark of the Closed Joint Stock Corporation Rays Lis', is in the field of show-business in Russia. It specializes besides edition of musical production in organisation of concert performances, presentations, concert tours, as well as presentation of publicity space.

== Awards ==
In 1996 Extraphone received a personal thank you letter from President Boris Yeltsin for organisation of the election campaign "Vote or You Will Lose".

== Memberships ==
The company is member of RFA.
