= Watch Out (Alla Pugacheva album) =

- Original cover

Studio album by Alla Pugacheva
- Released: 1985
- Recorded: 1984–1985
- Studio: KMH Studios, Stockholm
- Genre: Synth-pop; AOR
- Length: 51:21
- Label: World Record Music
- Producer: Lennart Sjöholm

Alla Pugacheva chronology
Akh, kak khochetsya zhit (1985)	Watch Out (1985)	...Schastya v lichnoy zhizni! (1986)

Alternative cover
- Soviet edition cover

Singles from Watch Out
- 1. "Lousy Party" / "Sacred Lie" Released: 1984; 2. "Superman" / "Every Night And Every Day" Released: 1985

Watch Out is the seventh studio album by Russian singer Alla Pugacheva released in Sweden in 1985 by World Record Music.

The album was re-released in the USSR in 1986 by Melodiya under the title Alla Pugacheva v Stokgolme (Russian: Алла Пугачёва в Стокгольме; transl. Alla Pugacheva in Stockholm). However, the Soviet edition included fewer songs than were on the original Swedish album. The total sales of the two editions amounted to 3,200,000 copies.

For the release of this record, the American company Ampex awarded the singer and all the other participants of the recording with a Golden Disc in March 1989.

== Track listing ==
=== Watch Out ===
Side one
No.	Title	Lyrics	Music	Length
1.	"Every Night And Every Day"	Jacob Dahlin	Alla Pugacheva	4:00
2.	"Through The Eyes Of A Child"	Ingela Forsman	Yuri Chernavsky	4:31
3.	"Superman"	Ingela Forsman	Yuri Chernavsky	4:13
4.	"Love Can Hurt"	Ingela Forsman	Lasse Holm	4:29
5.	"Cool Operator"	Ingela Forsman	Anders Glenmark	3:37
6.	"All The Time You Were Right Here"	Ingela Forsman	Torgny Söderberg	4:50

Side two
No.	Title	Lyrics	Music	Length
1.	"Watch Out"	Ingela Forsman	Lasse Holm	4:52
2.	"Sacred Lie"	Diomid Kostyurin; English lyrics by Jacob Dahlinа	Alla Pugacheva	4:57
3.	"Songbird"	Ingela Forsman	Lasse Holm	4:09
4.	"What A Lousy Party"	Thomas H. Minor	Torgny Söderberg	3:46
5.	"Capitan"	Ingela Forsman	Alla Pugacheva	3:42
6.	"Such A Miracle"	Jacob Dahlin	Lasse Holm	3:53
Total length:				51:21

=== Alla Pugacheva v Stokgolme ===
Side one
No.	Title	Lyrics	Music	Length
1.	"Dnyom i nochyu"	Jacob Dahlin	Alla Pugačëva	4:00
2.	"Glazami rebyonka"	Ingela Forsman	Yuri Chernavsky	4:31
3.	"Ljubov prichinyaet stradaniya"	Ingela Forsman	Lasse Holm	4:29
4.	"Beschuvstennaya telefonistka"	Ingela Forsman	Anders Glenmark	3:37
5.	"Vsyo vremya ty byl ryadom"	Ingela Forsman	Torgny Söderberg	4:50

Side two
No.	Title	Lyrics	Music	Length
1.	"Svjataja lož'"	Diomid Kostyurin; English lyrics by Jacob Dahlinа	Alla Pugačëva	4:57
2.	"Pevchaya ptichka"	Ingela Forsman	Lasse Holm	4:09
3.	"Neudachnaya vecherinka"	Thomas H. Minor	Torgny Söderberg	3:46
4.	"Kapitan"	Ingela Forsman	Alla Pugačëva	3:42
5.	"Takoe chudo"	Jacob Dahlin	Lasse Holm	3:53
Total length:				41:31

== Personnel ==
- Alla Pugacheva – lead vocals
- Rutger Gunnarsson – bass
- Håkan Mjörnheim (B2, B4) – lead guitar
- Lasse Wellander (A2, A5, B1) – lead guitar
- Håkan Mjörnheim (A4, B2, B3, B4) – guitar
- Lasse Wellander (A4, B2, B3, B4) – guitar
- Johan Stengård – horns
- Leif Lindvall – horns
- Magnus Johansson – horns
- Urban Wiborg – horns
- Johan Stengård (A3, A4, B3, B5) – saxophone
- Diana Nuñez – backing vocals
- Lasse Westman – backing vocals
- Liza Öhman – backing vocals
- Lotta Pedersen – backing vocals
- Lennart Sjöholm – production, arranging, engineering, mixing, backing vocals
- Åke Grahn – engineering, mixing

== Bibliography ==
- Razzakov, F. (2003) [Алла Пугачёва: По ступеням славы]. Alla Pugacheva: On the steps of glory (PDF). Moscow: Eksmo. ISBN 5-8153-0059-4. Archived from the original (PDF) on 2014-02-01.
