= The Woman who Sings =

- Directed by: Aleksandr Orlov
- Written by: Anatoly Stepanov
- Starring: Alla Pugacheva; Alla Budnitskaya
- Cinematography: Igor Gelein; Vladimir Stepanov
- Edited by: O. Rut
- Music by: Alla Pugacheva; Aleksandr Zatsepin; Leonid Garin; Nikolay Volkov
- Production company: Mosfilm
- Release date: 1978
- Running time: 79 minutes
- Country: Soviet Union
- Language: Russian

The Woman who Sings (Russian: Женщина, которая поёт, romanized: Zhenschina, kotoraya poyot) is a 1978 Soviet film by Aleksandr Orlov. It is a musical melodrama and fictionalized biography of Alla Pugacheva, where the heroine is represented by Anna Streltsova.

The All-Union premiere of the film took place on March 2, 1979. According to the results of the Soviet film distribution in 1979, the film won first place, having collected 55 million spectators, and the performer of the leading role Alla Pugacheva according to the poll of the magazine Soviet Screen was named "The Best Actress of the Year". At the same time the film itself took only 53 place in the vote for the best film of the year. "The Woman who Sings" occupies the 27th place in attendance in the history of Soviet box-office.

== Plot ==
The film follows the life of pop singer Anna Streltsova (Alla Pugacheva), who faces a critical juncture in her career. Frustrated by her lack of a defining song that could help her reach her full potential, Anna begins to question whether she should continue pursuing her singing career. Simultaneously, her personal life is unraveling—conflicts with her husband Valentin lead to their eventual divorce, leaving Anna emotionally unsettled. Yet, despite the strain, she remains steadfast in her passion for singing, refusing to abandon her dreams and steadily working her way toward success.

While relaxing with Valentin on the beach, Anna stumbles upon a poem titled "The Woman I Love," which she feels has the makings of a great song. As her career progresses, she performs in numerous concerts, steadily gaining recognition, but still lacks the one song that could define her. When she eventually meets the poem’s author, Andrei, she asks him to adapt the piece into lyrics for a song. Initially resistant, Andrei later suggests altering the title to "The Woman Who Sings." This collaboration becomes a turning point in Anna’s career, though her personal life remains tumultuous. Her divorce and the emotional fallout linger, and even as a romantic spark ignites between her and Andrei, his departure from Moscow prevents their relationship from flourishing. Anna remains resilient, channeling her emotions into her music and staying committed to her work.

Anna performs "The Woman Who Sings" at a major music competition, marking a new chapter in her career. The song’s profound emotional resonance propels her to unprecedented fame, cementing her status as the No. 1 star of the Soviet stage. The film concludes with scenes of Anna at the peak of her success, touring major cities, performing in grand venues, and captivating audiences with her powerful voice. Yet, despite her professional triumphs, she remains a lonely and introspective figure, burdened by the sacrifices she made along the way. Through it all, the film explores Anna’s struggle to reconcile her personal desires with her artistic ambition, culminating in her transformation into a celebrated, albeit solitary, icon.

== Cast ==
- Alla Pugacheva - Anna Streltsova
- Alla Budnitskaya - Masha, Anna's girlfriend
- Nikolay Volkov - Andrei, the poet
- Alexander Khochinsky - Valentin, Anna's husband
- Vadim Aleksandrov - Ivan Stepanovich Klimkin (Stepanych), administrator
- Leonid Garin - Leon, head of the ensemble
- Vladimir Shubarin - dancer
- Yuri Belov - passenger in an airplane
- Ilya Rutberg - Mikhail, Head of the Dance and Instrumental Ensemble

== Music ==
=== Soundtrack ===
Originally Aleksandr Zatsepin was to score the soundtrack. However, during the filming there was a conflict between Zatsepin and Pugacheva due to the fact that she, without warning him in advance, inserted her songs (under the pseudonym Boris Gorbonos) without his knowledge. Because of this, Zatsepin refused to be the composer, but agreed to leave his songs in the film. As a result, all background music was written by Alla Pugacheva.

Background music in the picture consists of two compositions, which later became songs in Pugacheva's repertoire. The episode with the child, as well as the conversation with Andrei and a rehearsal before the contest, is accompanied by a melody that later became the song "I Will Not Give You to Anyone" (Alla Pugacheva's music, Larisa Kulikova's lyrics, appeared in the repertoire of the singer in 1987). In the scene of the last conversation, Streltsova and her husband behind the scenes sounded vocalizing this melody.

At the last minute of the film the montage of Streltsova walking on the observation deck on the Lenin Hills, along the Victory Park in Tolyatti, a concert at the Volgar Sports Palace in Tolyatti is accompanied by a melody that later became the song "Applying all Force" (Alla Pugacheva's music, the words of Yevgeny Yevtushenko, appeared in the repertoire of the singer in 1978).

Also in the film was to sound the song "In the Grove of the Guelder-rose" to the music of Alla Pugacheva and verses of Yunna Morits, however the poet forbade the song to be used for her poems in the film. Subsequently, Pugacheva put other lyrics — a poem by Oleg Milyavsky, on original music of this song and so in Pugachev's repertoire appeared the song "Dad Bought a Car". Additionally, in the episode of the concert at the Railwaymen's Club, before the song "Come" sounded the first few measures of the song "What was Once", which was recorded by Pugacheva for the movie 31 June but did not make it into the film.

The text of the song "The Woman Who Sings" was originally written by the poet Qaysin Quli in Karachay-Balkar language, translated into Russian by Naum Grebnev and was called "The Woman I Love". Pugacheva removed two verses, changed the viewpoint from the third to the first person and amended the last line in the verses.

The song "If Long Suffering" was recorded for the movie The Cook and the Singer (1978) and sounded there in full. According to the original idea, this song should not have been in the "Woman Who Sings".

=== Songs ===
| No. | Title | Lyrics | Music | Length |
|---|---|---|---|---|
| 1. | "Pesenka pro menya" | Leonid Derbenyov | Aleksandr Zatsepin |
| 2. | "Esli dolgo muchitsa" (Fragment) | Leonid Derbenyov | Aleksandr Zatsepin |
| 3. | "Etot mir" | Leonid Derbenyov | Aleksandr Zatsepin |
| 4. | "O lyubvi ne govori" | Naum Labkovskiy | Moisei Ferkelman |
| 5. | "Priezhai" | Alla Pugacheva | Alla Pugacheva |
| 6. | "Pro estradu" | Leonid Derbenyov | Aleksandr Zatsepin |
| 7. | "Ty ne stal sudboy" | Leonid Derbenyov | Aleksandr Zatsepin |
| 8. | "Zhenschina, kotoraya poyot" | Qaysin Quli (translation Naum Grebnev) | Alla Pugacheva, Leonid Garin |
| 9. | "Sonet № 90" | William Shakespeare (translation Samuil Marshak) | Alla Pugacheva |
| 10. | "Da" | Leonid Derbenyov | Aleksandr Zatsepin |

== Reception ==
During the time of its release, the film had a mixed critical reception.
