= Zerkalo dushi =

Studio album by Alla Pugacheva
- Released: February 1978
- Recorded: 1975–1977
- Genre: Pop, art rock, blues rock, funk
- Length: 1:05:07
- Language: Russian
- Label: Melodiya

Alla Pugacheva chronology
Zerkalo dushi (1978)	Arlekino i drugiye (1979)

Professional ratings
Review scores
Source	Rating
Muzykalnaya zhizn	favourable

Zerkalo dushi (Russian: Зеркало души; transl. The Mirror Of The Soul) is the debut studio album by Russian soviet singer Alla Pugacheva released in the USSR in February 1978 (as double album). Later the album was released as two separate records.

The album includes songs mainly composed by Aleksandr Zatsepin. The album also includes three songs composed by Alla Pugacheva (under the pseudonym "Boris Gorbonos") two songs with music by Boris Rychkov and Mark Minkov.

The album was also released abroad in Bulgaria, Poland, Czechoslovakia and Spain. The album sold 10 million copies worldwide, including reissues.

== Background ==
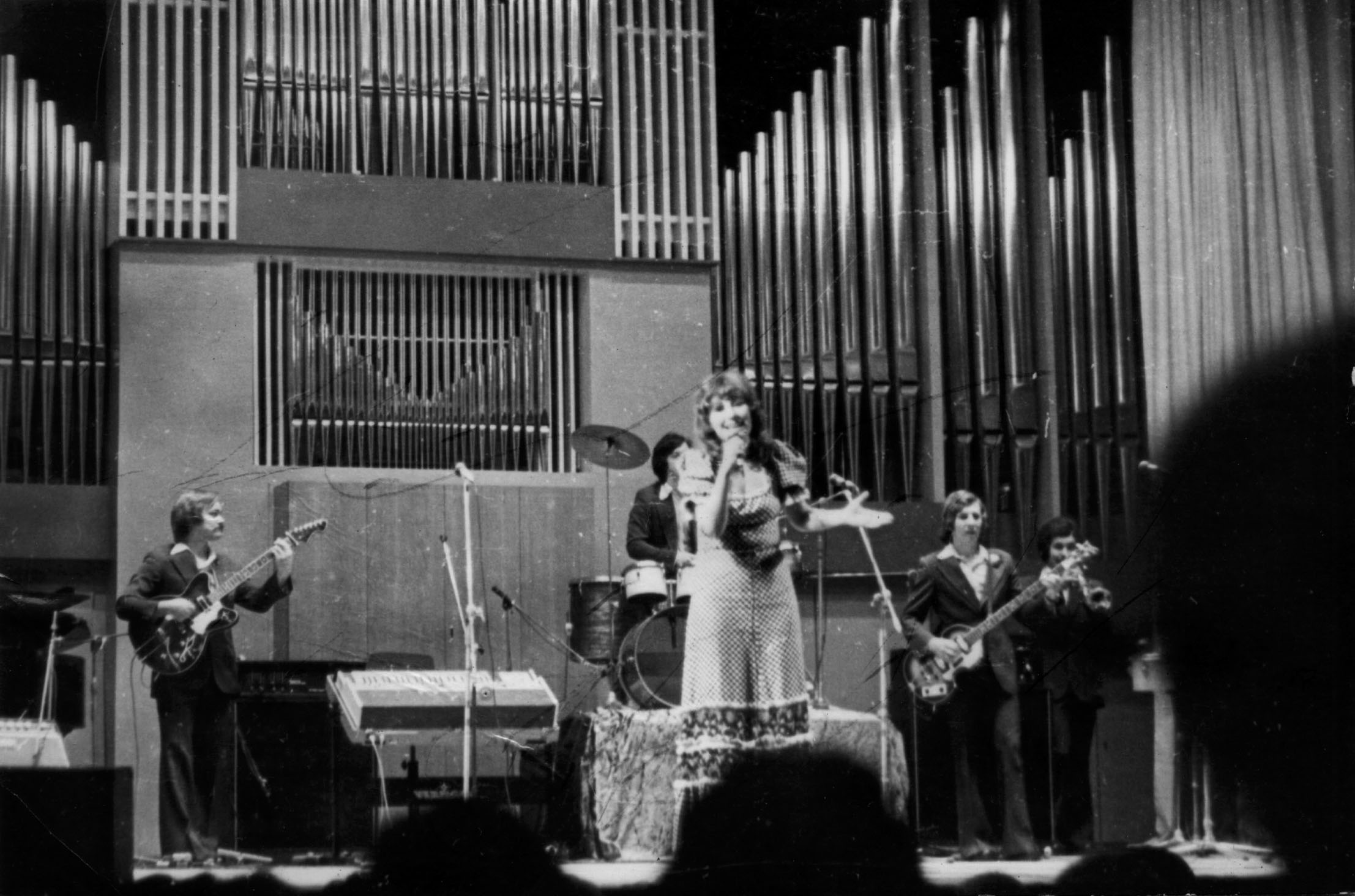
Alla Pugacheva and Vesyolye Rebyata in Yaroslavl in 1975

In 1965, Alla Pugacheva began her concert activity. In 1965 she went on the first tour in her life, it was a concert trip with mosestrada for the program "Bang-Bang, or "Satirical shots at misses", and in 1967 as part of the propaganda team of the radio station "Yunost" on a tour of the Arctic And Tyumen. After graduating from music school, she became a soloist of the Rosconcert and a concertmaster at the State School of Circus and Variety Art (GUTSEI), and then became the soloist of the VIA Novy electron at the Lipetsk regional Philharmonic. During the following years, Pugacheva worked in VIA Moskvichi in the Moscow regional Philharmonic in a jazz orchestra conducted by Oleg Lundstrom. In 1974 for her performance of the songs "Posidim, pookayem" and "Ermolova s Chistykh prudov", she was awarded the third prize at the Fifth all-Union competition of pop artists. In 1974-1976 she was a soloist of VIA Vesyolye Rebyata. In 1975 at the Golden Orpheus festival Pugacheva was awarded the Grand Prix for her performance of the song "Arlekino". This victory made her popular in the USSR and abroad. Later that year she released her first solo EP. After leaving the Vesyolye Rebyata in 1976, Pugacheva was briefly a soloist of the State variety orchestra of Armenia under the baton of Konstantin Orbelian. In 1977, having started a solo career, she was accompanied by VIA Rhythm from the Kharkov regional Philharmonic. In 1978, at the competition "Intervision Song Contest" in Sopot (Poland), the singer was awarded the Grand Prix for the performance of the song "Vsyo mogut koroli". Songs performed by her at that time were very often heard on radio and broadcast on television, but there was no solo album until 1978.

== Track listing ==
Side one
No.	Title	Lyrics	Music	Length
1.	"Бубен шамана" ("Buben shamana" (trans."Witch Doctor's Tambourine"))	Leonid Derbenyov	Aleksandr Zatsepin	6:58
2.	"Верю в тебя" ("Veryu v tebya" (trans. "I Believe In You"))	Onegin Gagigasimov	Aleksandr Zatsepin	4:52
3.	"Сонет 90" ("Sonet 90" (trans. "Sonnet 90")	William Shakespeare; Samuil Marshak (translation)	Boris Gorbonos	3:20

Side two
No.	Title	Lyrics	Music	Length
4.	"Приезжай" ("Priezhaj" (trans. "Come"))	Boris Gorbonos	Boris Gorbonos	5:41
5.	"Не отрекаются любя" ("Ne otrekayutsya lyubya" (trans. "Those Who Love Don't Renounce"))	Veronika Tushnova	Mark Minkov	4:08
6.	"Песенка про меня" ("Pesenka pro menya" (trans. "A Song About Me"))	Leonid Derbenyov	Aleksandr Zatsepin	3:33
7.	"Женщина, которая поёт" ("Zhenschina, kotoraya poyot" (trans. "The Woman Who Sings"))	Kaisyn Kuliev; Naum Grebnev (translation)	Boris Gorbonos; Leonid Garin	4:13

Side three
No.	Title	Lyrics	Music	Length
8.	"Всё могут короли" ("Vsyo mogut koroli" (trans. "King Can Do Everything"))	Leonid Derbenyov	Boris Rychkov	3:02
9.	"Куда уходит детство" ("Kuda ukhodit detstvo" (trans. "Where Childehood Goes"))	Leonid Derbenyov	Aleksandr Zatsepin	4:50
10.	"Волшебник-недоучка" ("Volshebnik-nedouchka" (trans. "A Half-Trained Wizard"))	Leonid Derbenyov	Aleksandr Zatsepin	3:19
11.	"Полно вокруг мудрецов" ("Polno vokrug mudretsov" (trans. "There Are Lots Of Wise Man Around"))	Leonid Derbenyov	Aleksandr Zatsepin	4:31

Side four
No.	Title	Lyrics	Music	Length
12.	"Мы не любим друг друга" ("My ne lyubim drug druga" (trans. "We Don't Love Each Other"))	Leonid Derbenyov	Aleksandr Zatsepin	3:33
13.	"Если долго мучиться" ("Yesli dolgo muchitsya" (trans. "If One Suffers Too Long"))	Leonid Derbenyov	Aleksandr Zatsepin	2:44
14.	"До свиданья, лето" ("Do svidanya, leto" (trans. "Goodbye, summer"))	Leonid Derbenyov	Aleksandr Zatsepin	4:34
15.	"Любовь одна виновата" ("Lyubov odna vinovata" (trans. "Love Only Is To Blame"))	Leonid Derbenyov	Aleksandr Zatsepin	3:16
16.	"Найди себе друга" ("Najdi sebe druga" (trans. "Find A Friend Foe Yourself"))	Leonid Derbenyov	Aleksandr Zatsepin	2:34

== Charts ==
=== Monthly charts ===
Chart	Date	Position
USSR (Zvukovaya Dorozhka)	June 1978	3
USSR (Zvukovaya Dorozhka)	August 1978	1
USSR (Zvukovaya Dorozhka)	September 1978	1 (Note: "Zerkalo dushi-1".)
USSR (Zvukovaya Dorozhka)	September 1978	4 (Note: "Zerkalo dushi-2".)
USSR (Zvukovaya Dorozhka)	June 1979	3
USSR (Zvukovaya Dorozhka)	June 1979	6
USSR (Zvukovaya Dorozhka)	March 1980	—

=== Year-end charts ===
Chart	Year	Position
USSR (Moskovskij Komsomolets)	1978	2 (Note: "Zerkalo dushi-1". Scored 772 points (for comparison: the 1st-place album of the group ABBA scored 815 points.)
USSR (Moskovskij Komsomolets)	1978	4 (Note: "Zerkalo dushi-1". Scored 401 points.)
USSR (Klub i hudozhestvennaya samodeyatelnost)	1978	1 (Note: Scored 3,989 points (for comparison: the 2nd-place album of the group Pesnyary scored 431 points; "Zerkalo dushi" in total collected more points than the all next 20 albums in the list.)
USSR (Moskovskij Komsomolets)	1979	2
USSR (Moskovskij Komsomolets)	1979	6

== Bibliography ==
- Razzakov, F. (2003) [Алла Пугачёва: По ступеням славы]. Alla Pugacheva: On the steps of glory (PDF). Moscow: Eksmo. ISBN 5-8153-0059-4. Archived from the original (PDF) on 2014-02-01.
- Savchenko, Boris (1992) [Дорогая Алла Борисовна...]. Dear Alla Borisovna... Moscow: Znaniye. p. 25.
