= Alla Pugacheva =

Russian singer (born 1949)

- Алла Пугачёва
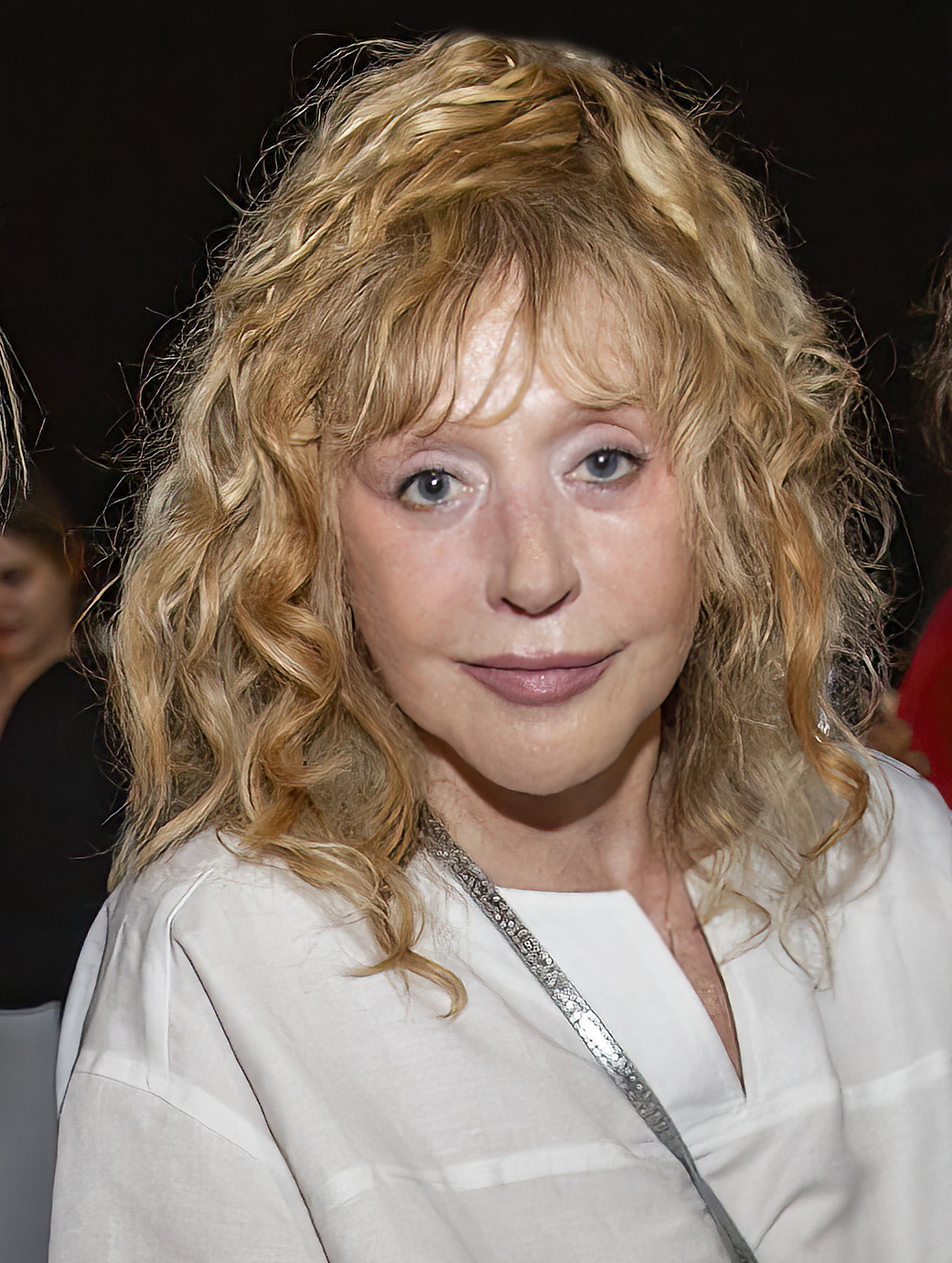
- Pugacheva in 2022
- Born: 15 April 1949 (age 77); Moscow, Soviet Union
- Other name: Boris Gorbonos
- Citizenship: Soviet Union (until 1991); Russia (from 1991); Israel
- Occupations: Singer; songwriter; actress
- Years active: 1965–present
- Notable work: Discography
- Spouses: Mykolas Orbakas (m. 1969; div. 1973) Alexander Stefanovich (m. 1976; div. 1980) Yevgeniy Boldin (m. 1985; div. 1993) Philipp Kirkorov (m. 1994; div. 2005) Maxim Galkin (m. 2011)
- Children: 3, including Kristina Orbakaitė
- Musical career
- Genres: Pop; soft rock; chanson; disco
- Instruments: Vocals; piano
- Labels: Melodiya; Balkanton; Supraphon; Polydor Records

Alla Borisovna Pugacheva (Note: In this name that follows East Slavic naming customs, the patronymic is Borisovna and the family name is Pugacheva. Sometimes Pugachova or Pugachyova) (Russian: Алла Борисовна Пугачёва, IPA: [ˈalːə bɐˈrʲisəvnɐ pʊɡɐˈtɕɵvə]; born 15 April 1949) is a Russian singer and songwriter. Her career began in 1965 and continues to this day, although she retired from performing in 2010 after the international concert tour "Dreams of Love". For her "clear mezzo-soprano and a full display of sincere emotions", she enjoys an iconic status across the former Soviet Union as the most successful Soviet performer in terms of record sales and popularity. For several decades, Pugacheva was a sex symbol, a style icon, an inspiration for Soviet women and a heroine of Russian tabloids. In the media, Pugacheva has been called "the Queen of Russian pop music". Pugacheva is one of the few Russian performers who has achieved international success, along with Anna Netrebko and t.A.T.u.

Her repertoire includes over 500 songs in Russian, English, German, French, Kazakh, Hebrew, Finnish and Ukrainian, and her discography has more than 100 records, CDs and DVDs. In addition to Russia and the former Soviet Union, Pugacheva's albums have been released in Japan, Korea, Sweden, Finland, Germany, Poland, Czechia, Slovakia, Bulgaria and Israel. In total, she has sold more than 250 million records. Her debut album, Mirror of the Soul, has sold 10 million copies. Pugacheva's other albums were also successful, including How Disturbing Is This Way, released in 1982, which sold 7 million copies.

During her career, Pugacheva has toured Eastern Europe, the Baltic states, Scandinavia, Central Asia and other countries around the world, including the United States, United Kingdom, France, Netherlands, Greece, Italy and Israel. She has performed in some of the most famous concert halls in the world, including Carnegie Hall in New York, Olympia in Paris, Friedrichstadt-Palast in Berlin, Royal Theater Carre in Amsterdam and Apollo in London.

In addition to Russia and the countries of the former USSR, Pugacheva's singles were included in the hit parade in other countries of Europe and Asia, including France, Sweden, Poland, Greece, Japan and Mongolia. The singles "Harlequin" and "А Million Scarlet Roses" are her main international hits.

In 1988, Billboard noted that Pugacheva “ranks with such great musicians of all time as Bing Crosby, Elvis Presley and Michael Jackson. In 2000, The New York Times called her "the goddess of Russian pop music, Moscow's Tina Turner with a touch of Édith Piaf".

She became a People's Artist of the USSR in 1991, a Laureate of the State Prize of the Russian Federation in 1995. In addition to state awards, Pugacheva was awarded regional and international music prizes. She has received awards in several countries around the world, including the United States, Germany, Finland, Poland, Bulgaria, Ukraine, Belarus, Azerbaijan, Armenia and the Ampex Golden Reel Award, among others. Pugacheva was recognized as the best singer of the 20th century in Eastern Europe by the ZD Awards, named a living legend and the best performer of the 1990s decade by the Ovation Award. In 2017, she was included in the list of "100 most influential Russians of the century" according to Forbes, along with Mikhail Gorbachev, Yuri Gagarin and Pavel Durov. In 2022, she was among three Russian women included in the BBC's 100 Women list. Pugacheva was inducted into the Top Hit Music Awards Hall of Fame. For several decades, Pugacheva had the largest fee among performers in Eastern Europe. Due to her many years of popularity in Eastern Europe and Central Asia, Pugacheva was compared by the media to Madonna, and she received the nickname Russian Madonna.

In addition to her career on the music stage, she starred in films and musicals, voiced films and recorded soundtracks. Pugacheva is considered a gay icon, and in 2012 she supported the punk group Pussy Riot. She was a UNICEF Goodwill Ambassador from 1998 to 2007.

== Early life and education ==
Pugacheva was born to Boris Mikhailovich Pugachyov and Zinaida Arkhipovna (née Odegova) Pugachyova in Moscow, on 15 April 1949. In 1956, she enrolled in music school No.31, and attended the Ippolitov-Ivanov music college. She went on to study at school No.496, finishing her studies there in 1964. She then studied in the choral-conducting department of the college. Pugacheva recorded her first track "Robot" in 1965, for a morning programme on Radio Yunost.

== Career ==
=== The beginning, solo career 1965–1976 ===
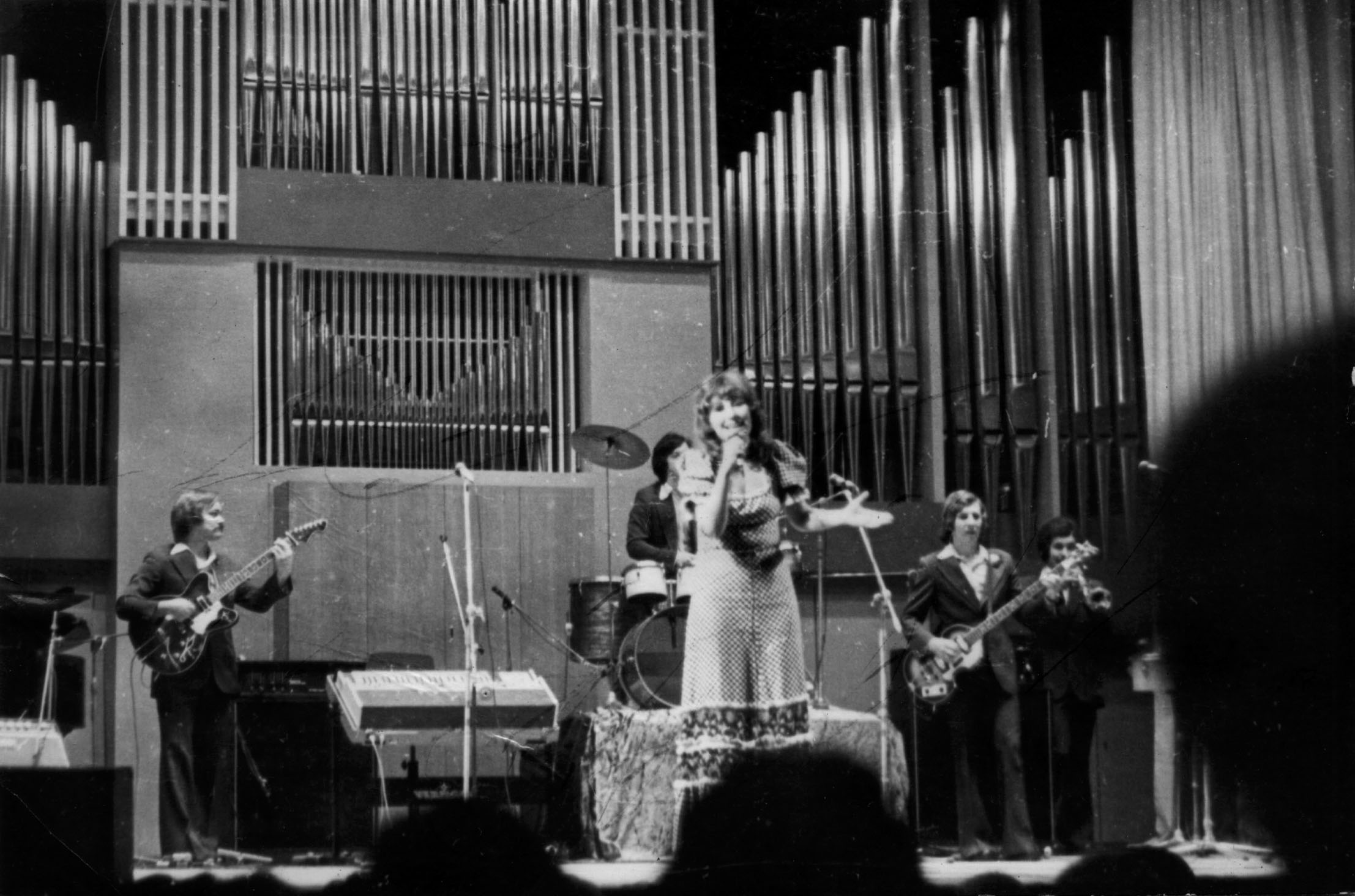
Pugacheva performing with Vesyolye Rebyata in Yaroslavl, November 1975

Pugacheva finished college in 1966 and subsequently toured with the group Yunost' (Youth) in western Siberia. The following year she began working as a piano accompanist at the State Circus Musical college. She provided the leading vocals to a number of bands, including Novy Elektron (New Electron), part of the Lipetsk State Philharmonic Society, in 1966, Moskvichi (Muscovites) in 1971, Oleg Lundstrem's band in 1972–73, and Vesyolye Rebyata (Merry Folks) in 1974–75. She recorded songs throughout that period for numerous movies.

In 1974, she came in 3rd place in the All-Union competition of musicians. In 1975, she received the Grand Prix of the Golden Orpheus international singing contest in Bulgaria, performing the song "Harlequin" by Emil Dimitrov. The Amiga label released her winning song as a single in East Germany. Subsequently, in Bulgaria, the Balkanton label released the live recording of "Harlequin" from the festival as a single. A year later, Pugacheva returned to the Golden Orpheus to perform a concert outside the competition. The Balkanton released the live tracks as Pugacheva's first album Zolotoy Orfey 76. The single "Harlequin" has sold 14 million copies. In that same year, Pugacheva recorded a number of songs for the musical drama-comedy The Irony of Fate as the singing voice of Nadja, the female protagonist.

In 1976, Pugacheva performed at the international music exhibition MIDEM in Cannes (France).

=== The Woman Who Sings, 1977–1980 ===
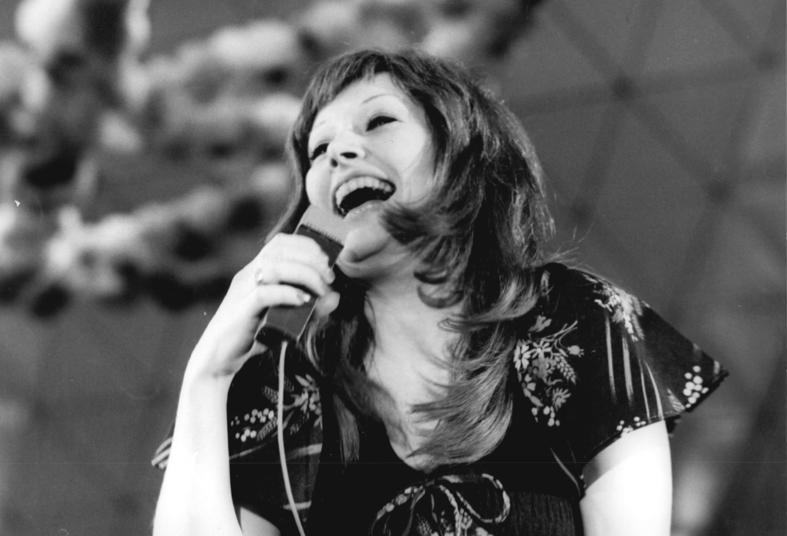
Pugacheva in East Berlin in 1976.

Pugacheva went on to work on the musical film The Woman who Sings in cooperation with the band Ritm (Rhythm) in 1977. She played the leading lady, a famous pop singer who sacrifices her personal life for her career. The soundtrack, which was co-written by Pugacheva and composed of pop songs, culminated with the dramatic title ballad "Zhenshchina, kotoraya poyot". The Soviet audience, regarding the film as autobiographical, brought the soundtrack to reach record audience of the year in 1979, as it was bought by 55 million people. The soundtrack was first released in 1977 as part of the double album Zerkalo dushi (Mirror of the Soul), which was a collection of her songs from 1975 to 1977. The Victor label released a collection album Alla Pugacheva in the same year in Japan. In 1978, performing the song "Vsyo mogut koroli" ("Kings Can Do Anything"), Pugacheva received the Amber Nightingale prize at the Sopot International Song Festival which at the time meant automatically winning the Grand Prix of the Intervision Song Contest. In 1980, the Kansan label of Finland released her above-listed works as the compilation album Huipulla (At the Top). Also, the release of Pugacheva's album took place in West Germany.

In July 1979 in Moscow, Pugacheva performed in a duet with Joe Dassin.

=== Watch Out, 1981–1984 ===
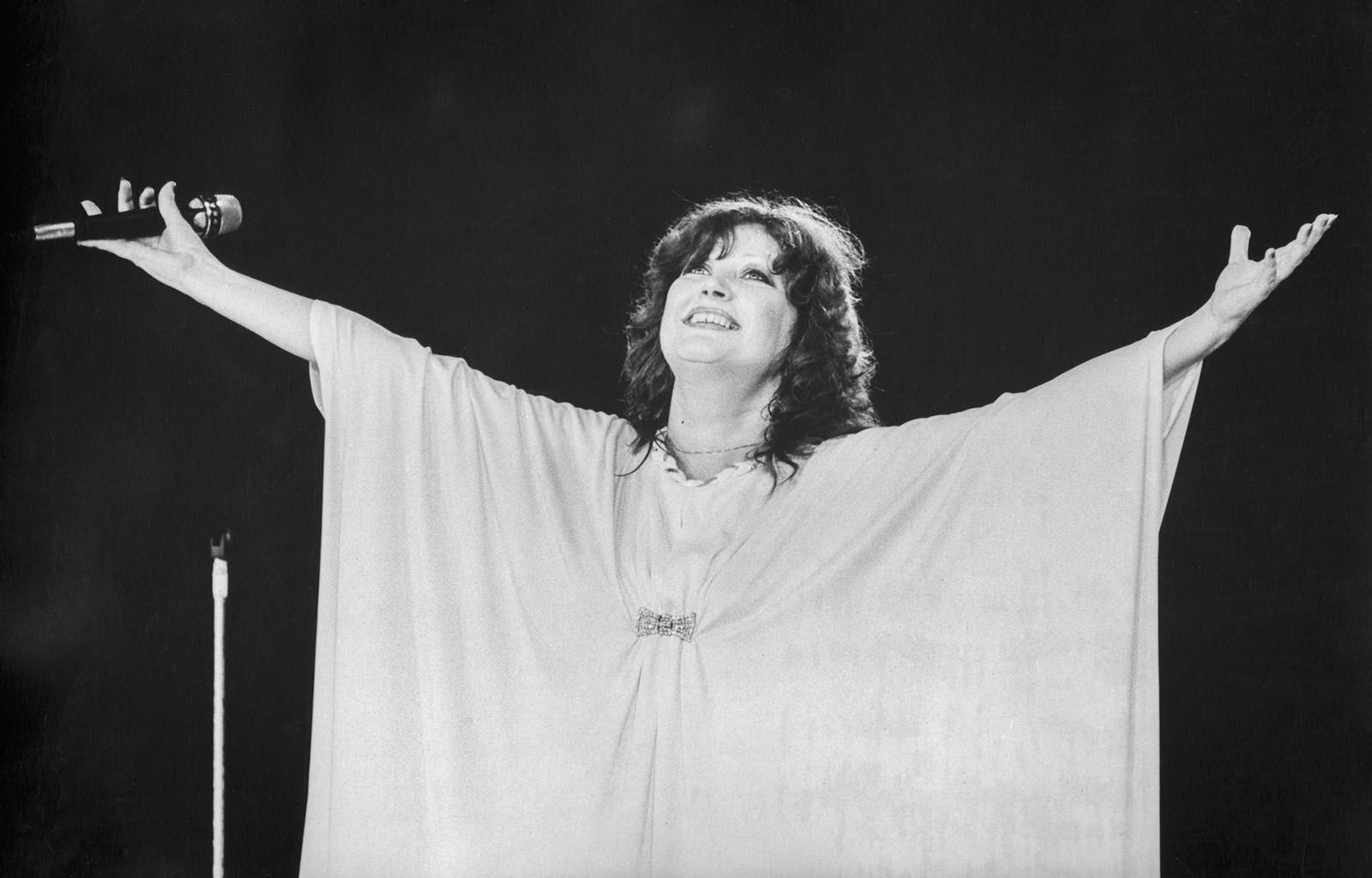
Pugacheva performing at Olympic Stadium in Moscow, 1983

During the 1980s, Pugacheva was a frequent visitor to Stockholm. She started out with multiple guest appearances on the popular Swedish radio show Galaxen (April 1980 year) conducted by Jacob Dahlin, and later frequently appeared on his TV show Jacobs Stege (Jacob's Ladder). Dahlin and Pugacheva used to perform duets, such as "Superman" where Dahlin sings as the title character. In Stockholm, Pugacheva recorded an album in English, released by the World Record Music label in Sweden as Watch Out and by the Melodiya label in the Soviet Union as Alla Pugacheva in Stockholm.

=== International success, tour in Scandinavia, 1985–1994 ===
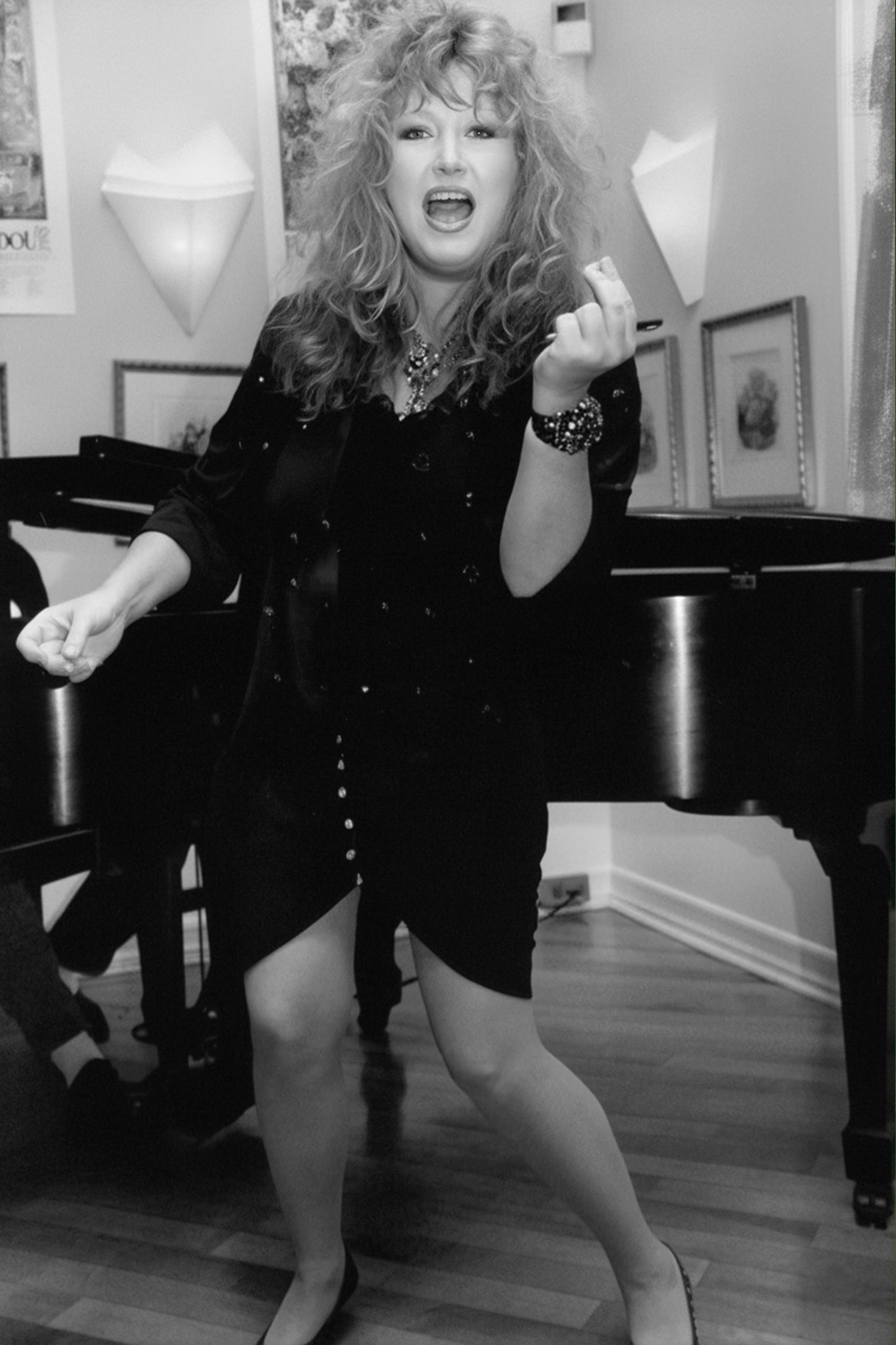
Pugacheva at Radio City Music Hall in New York City, 1988.

The period 1985–1988 became a new, so-called "youth period" in Pugacheva's work: the arrangements of most of the compositions were made in a modern style with a hard rock guitar, and the lyrics contained more social themes.

In the mid-1980s, Pugacheva toured Finland, Sweden and other Scandinavian countries, as well as the Baltic countries, Eastern Europe and Central Asia. Her performance was a success. Therefore, in 1985, in Finland, in the port of Kotka, the ceremony of launching the ferry "Alla", named in honor of Pugacheva, took place.

In 1985 to 1988, Pugacheva performed with German rocker Udo Lindenberg. The result of their collaboration was the release of the album "Songs instead of Letters", published by Polydor Records in Germany and Melodiya in the USSR. In May 1987, Pugacheva performed the song "One Voice" at a concert in Vienna with American singer Barry Manilow. At the same time, she performed with the Swedish pop group Herreys and the Norwegian pop group Bobbysock. In September 1987, Pugacheva's single "Find Me" entered ZDF-Hitparade in Germany.

In 1986, she performed in Chernobyl for the liquidators of the nuclear power plant accident.

In 1987, Pugacheva was the headliner of the Sanremo Music Festival along with Whitney Houston.

In 1989, Pugacheva performed at the Country Music Festival (Nashville, USA).

In 1990, Pugacheva participated as a guest in the World Music Awards ceremony in Monte Carlo.

In 1991, she performed at the music festival in Ariccia.

In 1994, she performed at a rock music festival in Tallinn.

=== Voice of Asia, 1995–2006 ===
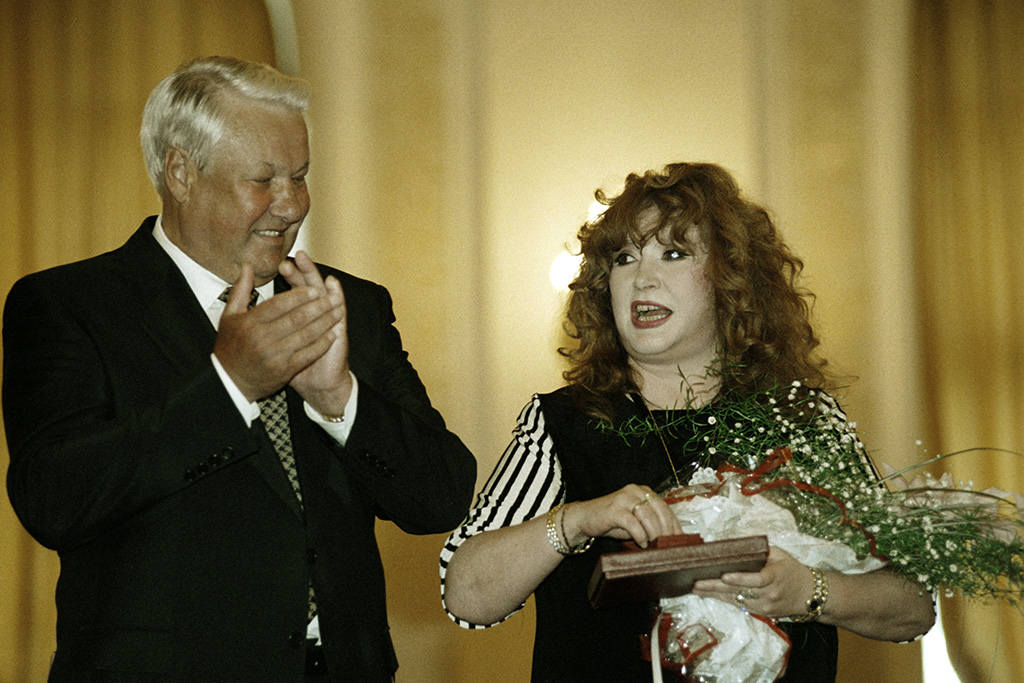
Pugacheva with Boris Yeltsin in 1995

In 1995, Pugacheva was the headliner of the Voice of Asia music festival in Almaty along with Toto Cutugno was also a headliner.

She represented Russia in the Eurovision Song Contest 1997 with the song "Primadonna", finishing in 15th place out of 25 places.

In 1997, together with the Econika Corporation, the singer launched her own brand of shoes under the Alla Pugachova brand. The shoes became the most successful non-song business project of the singer, along with the perfume "Alla", produced for many years since 1990 by the French perfume company "Sogo".

From 1998 to 2000, Pugacheva made an international tour with the "Yes" program for large halls, including stadiums, and the "Favorites" program for chamber halls, such as theaters and cultural centers. Over three years, she gave more than 150 concerts in Eastern Europe, as well as in Germany, Greece, Israel, Britain and the United States. She also released video clips for her hits from this period, such as "Autumn Leaves", "Call Me With You", "A candle was burning on the table", and received the Golden Gramophone award, awarded by Russian Radio.

In 1999, she guest starred at the historic concert of the Gay Men's Chorus of Los Angeles in Moscow at the Tchaikovsky Concert Hall.

Pugacheva had sold a quarter of a billion records by 2000; in 2003, Pugacheva released the album “Live in Peace, Country!”, and in 2008, “Invitation to Sunset,”, albums received gold disc status in Russia from IFPI; in 2023 one of her songs were used for Atomic Heart for the intro.

From 2005 to 2019, Pugacheva awarded a cash prize from personal funds in the amount of $50,000 to young talented performers from Eastern Europe, the Baltics and Central Asia, including rock musician Koop Arponen from Finland, Tina Karol from Ukraine, Marina Lucenko from Poland, Stas Shurins from Latvia, Monika Linkyte from Lithuania, Maxim Erzhan from Kazakhstan and others.

=== "Dreams of Love" and leaving the stage, 2007–2014 ===
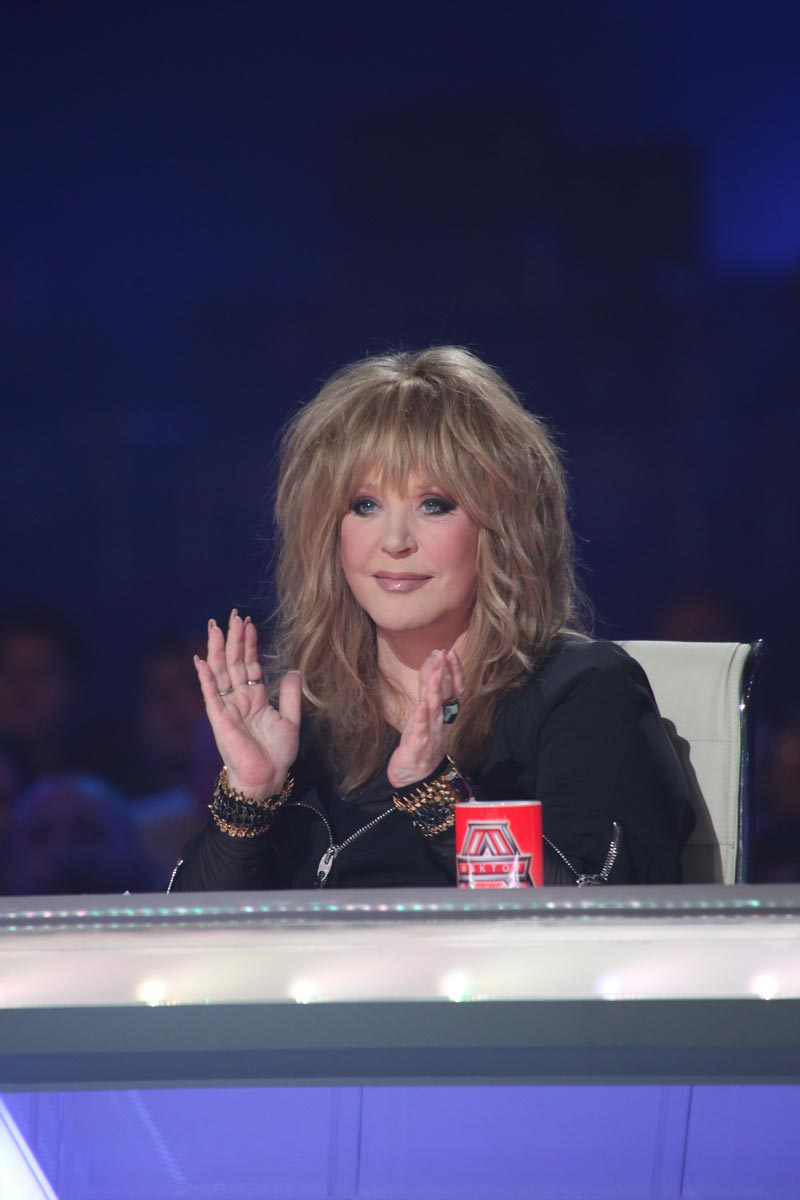
Pugacheva as the head of jury of the Faktor A show (Russian version of The X Factor), 2012

On 20 July 2007, Alla Pugacheva became the artistic director of her own FM radio station "Radio Alla" (Note: Joint venture with Prof-Media, then a subsidiary of Interros) in Moscow; she influenced the musical policy and also hosted her own programs "Hello, Alla", "Visiting Alla", "Alla is Looking for Talent". She left the station in November 2010 and the station's name was changed to "Radio Romantika". (Note: In 2015, Gazprom-Media, a Gazprom subsidiary, acquired Prof-Media. Most of Radio Romantika's stations in Russia were later reformatted as Comedy Radio, leaving the Moscow station (98.8 MHz) intact.)

From April 2009 to March 2010, Pugacheva made an international concert tour “Dreams of Love”, performing in 13 countries, including the United States, Germany, the Baltic countries, Israel, Bulgaria and others. The concert program included some hits from the 1980s, 1990s and 2000s. Pugacheva opened the concert show with the song “I Sing”. On 5 March 2009 at a press conference, Pugachova announced the end of her touring activities after the tour.

From 2011 to 2013, Pugacheva was a member of the jury of the Russian version of the British talent show The X Factor (Factor A).

In 2014, in Jūrmala a concert was held dedicated to the work of Pugacheva, at which performers from the countries of the former USSR and the Baltic states performed cover versions of her hits; among the guests were Ricky Martin, Il Volo, Alessandro Safina, Ola Svensson and others. Pugacheva herself performed at the finale of the evening.

=== The end of the singing career and subsequent artistry, 2015–present ===
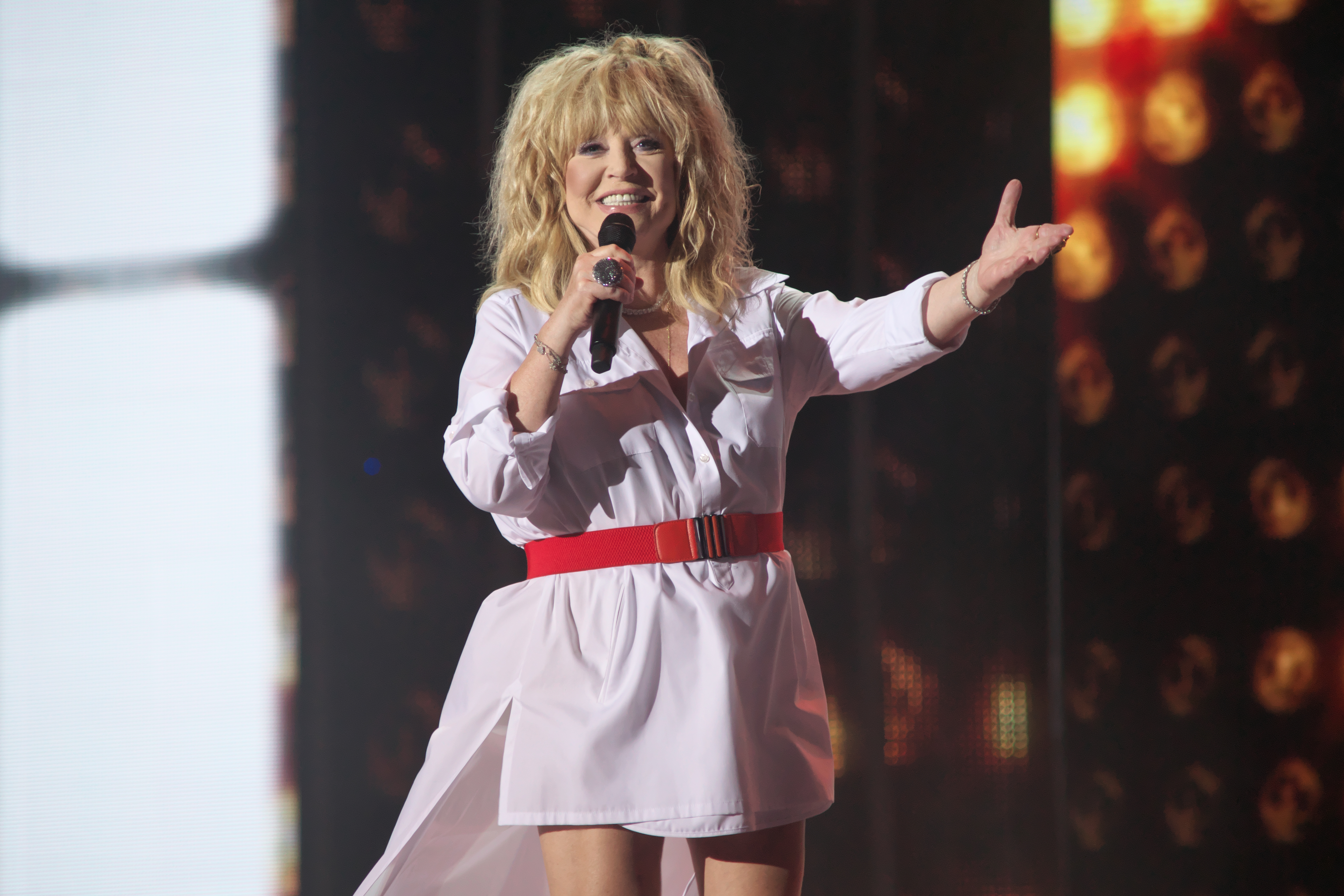
Pugacheva singing at Slavianski Bazaar in Vitebsk, Belarus, 2016

In 2015, on The Tonight Show, Jimmy Fallon, after listening to Alla Pugacheva's single Superman, noted that he liked Pugacheva's performance. In the same year, Pugacheva gave an interview to the Kazakh TV channel Khabar. The interview was conducted by Arman Davletyarov.

In 2017, she performed at a music festival in Baku.

On 17 April 2019, in Moscow, Pugacheva presented the solo concert “P.S.”.

In 2021, she recorded the soundtrack for the film Chernobyl, directed by Danila Kozlovsky.

In May 2022, Pugacheva participated in the Free Culture Forum in Tel Aviv. The forum was also attended by Russian rock musicians Andrey Makarevich and Boris Grebenshchikov. In September 2022, she would attend former Soviet leader Mikhail Gorbachev's funeral.

In 2024, she visited the Rendezvous music festival in Jurmala as a guest. Among the festival's participants were Londonbeat and Nemo.

=== Voice rating and art career appraisal ===
In 2004, Polish musicologist and cultural critic Grzegorz Piotrowski noted Pugacheva's wide vocal range from contralto to soprano — her vocal technique combines different ways of operating the voice.

Russian music critic Alexey Mazhaev, in a review of Pugacheva's album "How Disturbing Is This Way", noted a combination of different genres — folk ("Stairs"), reggae ("Hold Me, straw"), blues ("That's how it Happened, Mom"), gypsy style ("Old Song"). Mazhaev also noted that in 12 of the 16 compositions, the singer wrote the music herself, demonstrating completely different vocal techniques and acting skills.

The French newspaper France-Soir gave a positive review of Pugacheva's performance at the Olympia concert hall in Paris in 1982; also, a story about Pugacheva's performance was shown in the news on the Soviet Central Television.

Jon Pareles, having attended Pugacheva's performance at Carnegie Hall in 1988, noted the singer's versatility and vocal subtlety, while speaking about her music, he found that she was “Western-oriented in vocal styles, instruments (keyboards, electric guitars, trap drums), arrangements, song forms and rhythms. But even with their American and European trappings, the songs have an unmistakably Slavic tone, conveyed not only by the hard consonants of the Russian lyrics, but also by the shifting, theatrical moodiness and almost constant use of minor keys.

=== Сollaboration ===
During her career, Pugacheva collaborated with artists from around the world, including Jacob Dahlin, Raimonds Pauls, Gloria Gaynor, Demis Roussos, Alexander Bard, Joe Dassin, Udo Lindenberg, Barry Manilow, Herreys, Bobbysocks! and others.

She also performed in 2009 in a duet with Ukrainian singer Sofia Rotaru, performing the song “Not Gonna Get Us” from the repertoire of t.A.T.u.

=== Film work ===
In addition to her musical career, she has several film roles, which were positively received by critics and received film awards. Her most famous roles are in such films as "The Woman Who Sings" in 1978, musicals “Old Songs about the Main Thing” in 1996, 1997, 2000, and “Chasing Two Rabbits” in 2003, "Kingdom of Crooked Mirrors" in 2007, and recording the soundtrack for the film "Chernobyl" in 2021. Pugacheva was recognized as the best actress in Eastern Europe according to the magazine “Soviet Screen” in 1979.

== Influence on popular culture ==
Over the years of her creative activity, which began in the mid-1960s, Pugacheva influenced the art of performers of the 90s of the twentieth century and subsequent generations, as well as the consciousness of people in the countries of Eastern Europe, the Baltics and Central Asia. She embodied the image of a strong and free woman. Pugacheva gave freedom in art, freedom of expression to people from all countries of the former USSR. The media called Pugacheva the “Russian Madonna”.

In 1997, Pugacheva appeared on the cover of Ogoniok, and in 1999 Vogue dedicated its cover to her. In 2019, Hello and Ok dedicated their cover to her. In the 2000s, MTV called Pugacheva a pop music legend. In 2021, according to the Romir Center for Public Opinion Research, Pugacheva took 1st place in the ranking of the "Most influential Musicians in Russia". In 2024, Forbes made a dedication to Pugacheva.

Italian singer-songwriter Toto Cutugno noted that he considers Pugacheva an outstanding singer; а similar opinion was expressed by Swedish musician, member of the pop group ABBA Björn Ulvaeus.

From 1988 to 2012, Pugacheva organized the Christmas Meetings music festival. Performers from Eastern Europe and Central Asia took part in the festival, including Svetlana Loboda and Vitas. Pugacheva herself also performed at the festival. In 2011 and 2012 she also organized the Crimea music fest in Yalta, which is an international music festival. The festival was attended by performers from the United States, Ukraine, Greece, Spain, Estonia, Finland, Israel, India, Kazakhstan, Kenya, Australia and other countries, including Gloria Gaynor, Demis Roussos, Alexander Bard, Goran Bregović and others.

Cover versions of songs from Pugacheva's repertoire have been recorded by pop, rock and hip-hop artists from around the world, including Patricia Kaas ("I Like It"), Lara Fabian ("Love Like a Dream"), Muslim Magomayev ("Every night and Every Day"), Bi-2 ("Paper Kite"), Tokiko Kato ("Millions of scarlet Roses") and others. In addition, 50 Cent used a sample from the song "Shakespeare's Sonnet" from Pugacheva's repertoire in their hit "Piggy Bank".

In 2019, at the White Nights festival in Saint Petersburg, a tribute to Alla Pugacheva's 50-year career took place. The festival was attended by Chris Norman, Bonnie Tyler, Level 42 and others.

In 2022, Latvian singer Laima Vaikule noted that Pugacheva was and remains the main Russian star. In previous years, similar opinions were expressed by other performers from Eastern Europe and Central Asia, including the Ukrainian singer Vera Brezhneva, Kazakh group A-Studio, Tajik singer Manizha, Russian singer Valery Leontiev and others.

In the film "Empire V", released in 2023, the image of the goddess Ishtar was copied from Pugacheva, who was one of the main pop icons in show business in Russia and Eastern Europe for several decades.

== Legacy ==
In 1985, in Finland, in the port of Kotka, a ceremony was held to launch the ferry Alla, named after Pugacheva.

In 2003, a lifetime monument to the singer was installed in Moscow in the courtyard of a house on Zemlyanoy Val Street, 52 (later stolen).

In 2009, Pugacheva's name plate was laid on the Square of Stars of the Slavic Bazaar festival in Vitebsk.

In 2014, designers Vasily Barbier and Sergei Amelkov produced 13 dolls copying various stage images of Pugacheva. In addition to Pugacheva, the designers made dolls in the image of Madonna and Whitney Houston.

In 2019, her personal exhibition took place at the Boris Yeltsin Presidential Center in Yekaterinburg.

In 2023, the premiere of the play “Iceberg” took place in Cannes, France. The play was staged by Estonian director Rene Kirspuu. The play tells the story of a teacher who has gone crazy because of Pugacheva's emigration to Israel and imagines herself to be a prima donna. Actress Yulia Aug, who embodied the image of “Diva,” noted that for her Pugacheva is the greatest artist; she is a code that is embedded in the DNA of the majority of Eastern Europeans, and no one can cancel her status as a legend, despite all the events that are currently happening in Russia and the world.

Famous artists, poets, musicians, performers from Eastern Europe and Central Asia dedicated paintings, poems, songs and performances to Pugacheva, including Nikas Safronov, Evgeny Yevtushenko, Dmitry Bykov, Kirill Serebrennikov, Serebro and Svetlana Loboda.

== Personal life ==
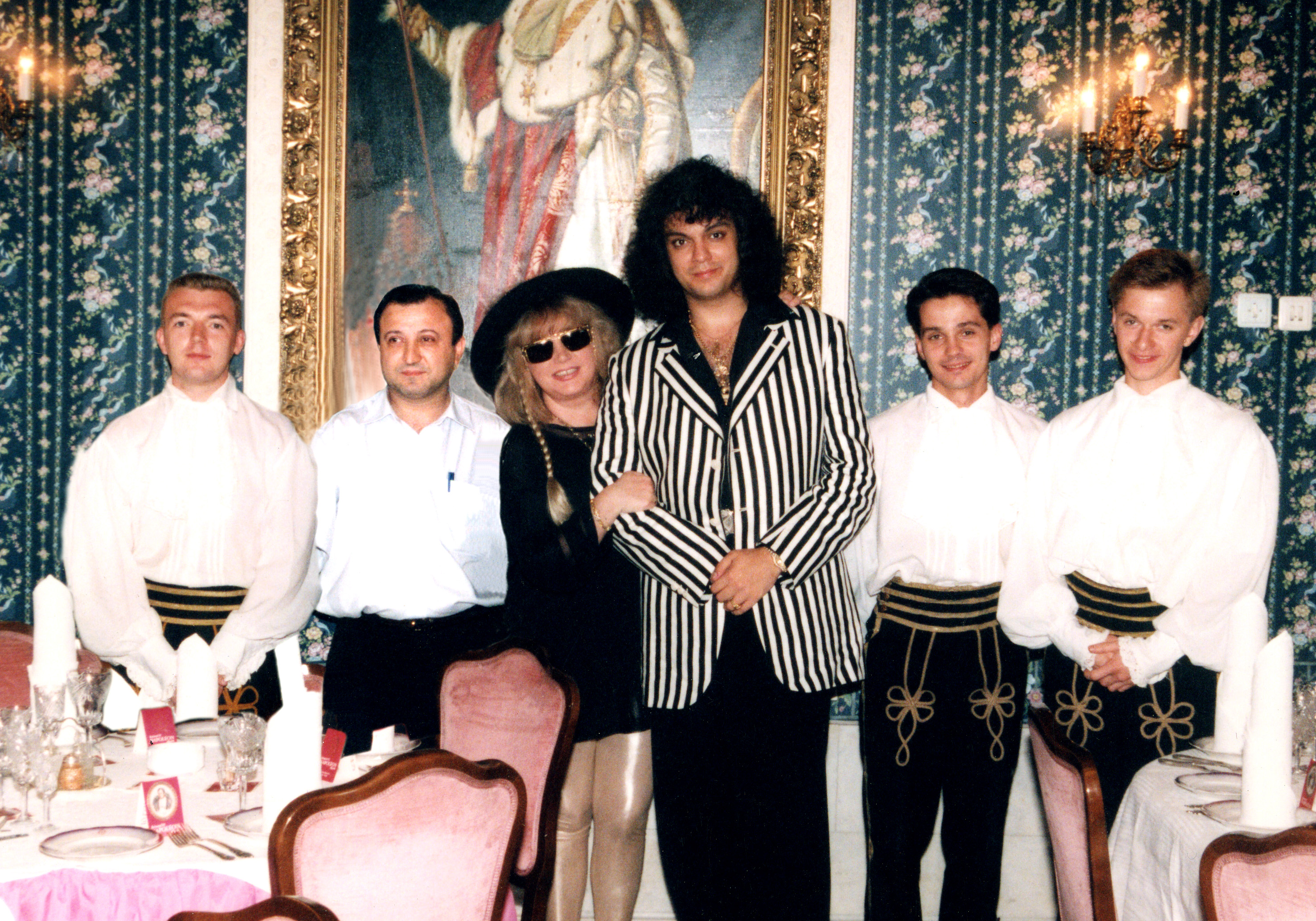
Pugacheva with her fourth husband Philipp Kirkorov in Kyiv, April 1994

In 1969, she married Lithuanian circus performer Mykolas Orbakas, and on 25 May 1971 she gave birth to a daughter, Kristina Orbakaitė, who is also a popular singer. Pugacheva divorced Orbakas after four years of marriage in 1973.

She married film director Alexander Stefanovich (1945–2021) in 1976 and starred in several of his movies. The union was dissolved in 1980.

In 1985, Pugacheva married producer Yevgeniy Boldin, with whom she had numerous professional collaborations. She had a working and romantic relationship with a young musician and singer, Vladimir Kuzmin during this period. In 1993, she divorced Yevgeniy Boldin stating that their professional lives interfered too much with their personal life.

In 1994, she married a pop singer, Philipp Kirkorov. Their divorce was announced in November 2005.

On 23 December 2011, Pugacheva married singer and comedian Maxim Galkin. The couple has twins delivered by a surrogate mother.

In 2025, Pugacheva stated that she considered only her first and fifth marriages to be genuine. According to her, Alexander Stefanovich married her in order to obtain a Moscow residence permit, Evgeny Boldin did so because their relationship outside of marriage was considered a “bad example” by the authorities, and her union with Philip Kirkorov was entered into in order to further his career.

== Political and social activities ==
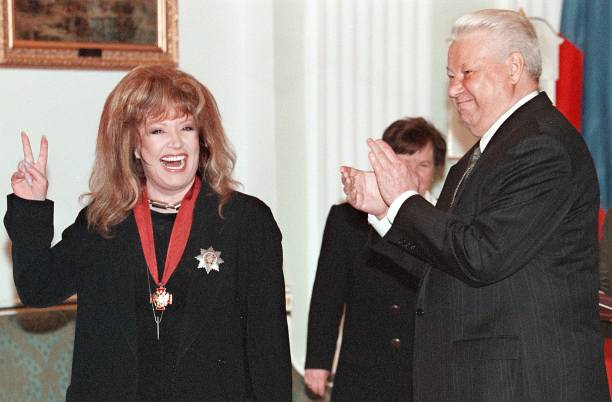
President Boris Yeltsin awards the Order "For Merit to the Fatherland", 2nd class, to Pugacheva, 15 April 1999

From 1963 to 1977, starting when she was fourteen, Pugacheva was a member of the Komsomol.

On the day of the 1991 Soviet coup d'état attempt, while in Odesa in the company of Mikhail Zhvanetsky, she expressed confidence that there would be no turning back, that their time had passed.

In June 1996, Pugacheva actively participated in the pre-election tour of Boris Yeltsin's presidential campaign "Vote or lose." Later, she did not hide that she had taken much money for her performances at concerts as part of this election campaign. On 14 June 1996, two days before the vote, an interview with Leonid Parfyonov was aired in the Hero of the Day program on the NTV channel, in which Pugacheva called on all Russians to vote for Yeltsin.

In 1998, Pugacheva supported Valery Zubov as candidate for the governorship of the Krasnoyarsk Krai.

From 1998 to 2007, Pugacheva was a UNICEF Goodwill Ambassador.

In December 2005, Pugacheva became a member of the Civic Chamber under the president of the Russian Federation, where she worked on social development issues until 2008.

For the 2007 Russian legislative election, Pugacheva starred in a United Russia campaign video.

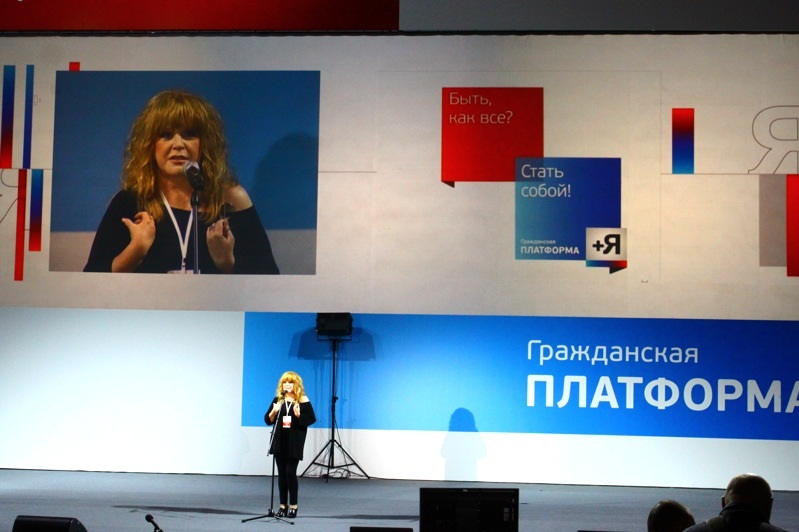
Speech at the congress of the Civic Platform party (2012)

Since September 2011, Pugacheva has openly supported politician Mikhail Prokhorov. She declared her readiness to join his party, then joined his Public Council; together with Andrey Makarevich, she sang the song "Samy vysoky" (The Tallest) about him, and also took part in various press conferences of Prokhorov and congresses of the public council of the Civic Platform party. On 14 September, she took part in the party congress. However, after the removal of its leader, the day after the congress at a meeting of supporters of Mikhail Prokhorov, she left the party, blaming Vladislav Surkov for what happened.

In 2012, Pugacheva supported the punk group Pussy Riot.

Alla is considered to be a gay icon in Russia by Russian LGBT community.

Pugacheva took second place in the ranking of "100 Most Influential Women of Russia" (Ogoniok, 2012) and 4th in the ranking of "The Smartest Women of Russia" (Russian Public Opinion Research Center, 2012).

=== Russo-Ukrainian War ===
In March 2014, Pugacheva signed a petition against the persecution of Andrey Makarevich, who protested against the annexation of Crimea and war in Donbas.

In March 2022, Pugacheva and Galkin, whose mother is Jewish, left Russia for Israel following the 2022 Russian invasion of Ukraine. In August 2022, Pugacheva returned to Russia hoping to clean up "the mess in people's heads". In September 2022, after her husband had been declared a "foreign agent", she spoke out publicly condemning the war and senseless death of countless Russian men. She also asked the Ministry of Justice to declare her a foreign agent, too.

Прошу зачислить меня в ряды иноагентов моей любимой страны, ибо я солидарна со своим мужем, честным, порядочным и искренним человеком, настоящим и неподкупным патриотом России, желающим Родине процветания, мирной жизни, свободы слова и прекращения гибели наших ребят за иллюзорные цели, делающие нашу страну изгоем и утяжеляющие жизнь наших граждан.
I ask to enlist me in the list of foreign agents of my beloved country, because I'm in solidary with my husband, an honest, decent and sincere person, a true and incorruptible patriot of Russia which wishes the Motherland prosperity, peaceful life, freedom of speech and an end of the deaths of our men for the illusory goals that make our country an outcast and make life difficult for our citizens.

— Alla Pugacheva on War in Ukraine, September 18, 2022

Russian authorities began investigating Pugacheva for "discrediting" the Russian military under Russian 2022 war censorship laws. In October 2022, Pugacheva revealed that she had left Russia again for Israel. She has received Israeli citizenship. In November 2023, Pugacheva returned to Russia for a few days before leaving again for Latvia. As of 2024, Pugacheva resided in Cyprus.

The British pop group Pet Shop Boys supported Pugacheva. The band members said they admired her courage and honesty. German rock musician Udo Lindenberg and Ukrainian singer Svetlana Loboda also expressed words of support for Pugacheva.

In September 2025 in her interview to Katerina Gordeeva Pugacheva stated: "Telling your Motherland that it is wrong is patriotism".

== Honours and awards ==
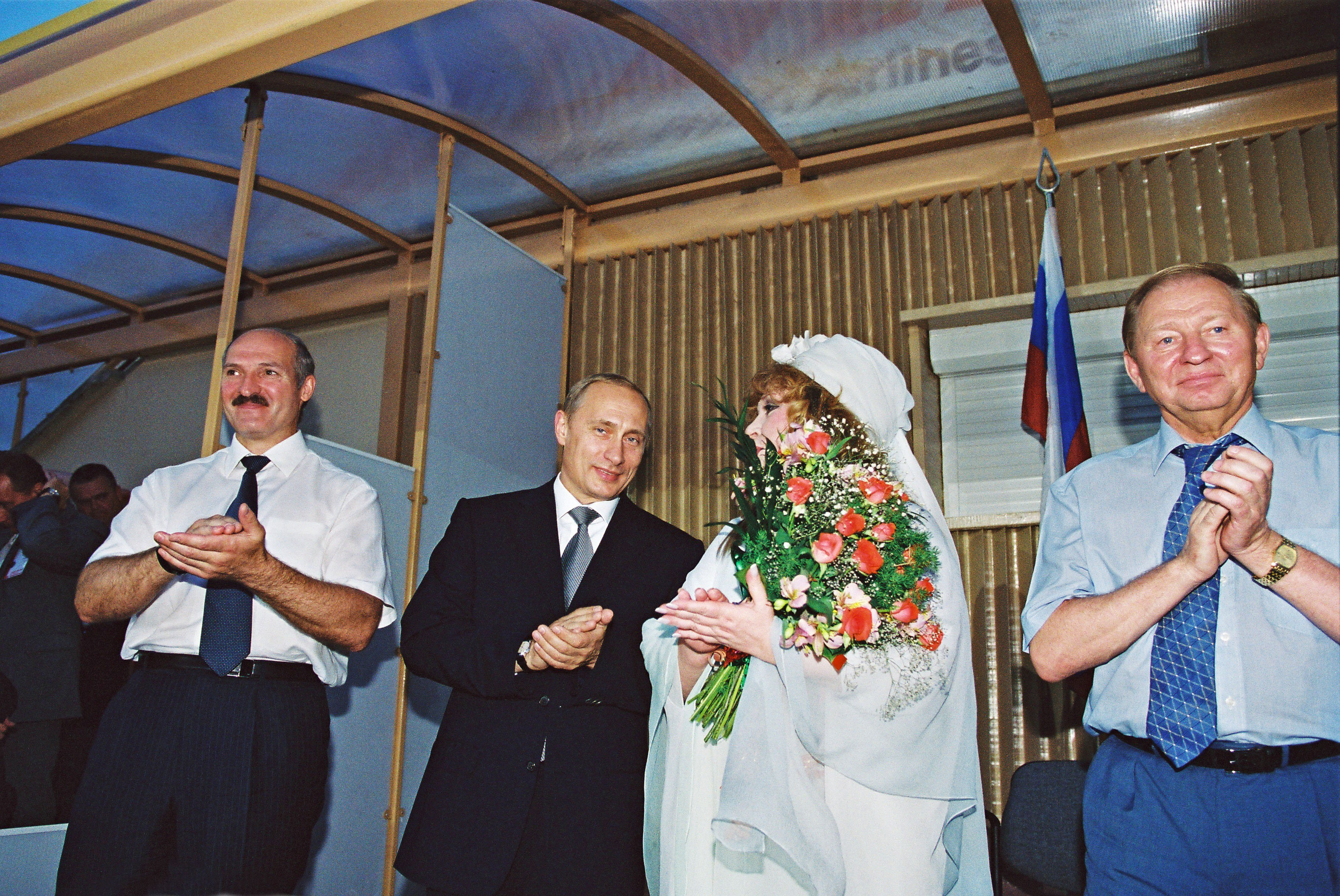
Pugacheva with Belarusian president Alexander Lukashenko, Russian president Vladimir Putin, and Ukrainian president Leonid Kuchma in Slavianski Bazaar in Vitebsk, 25 July 2001

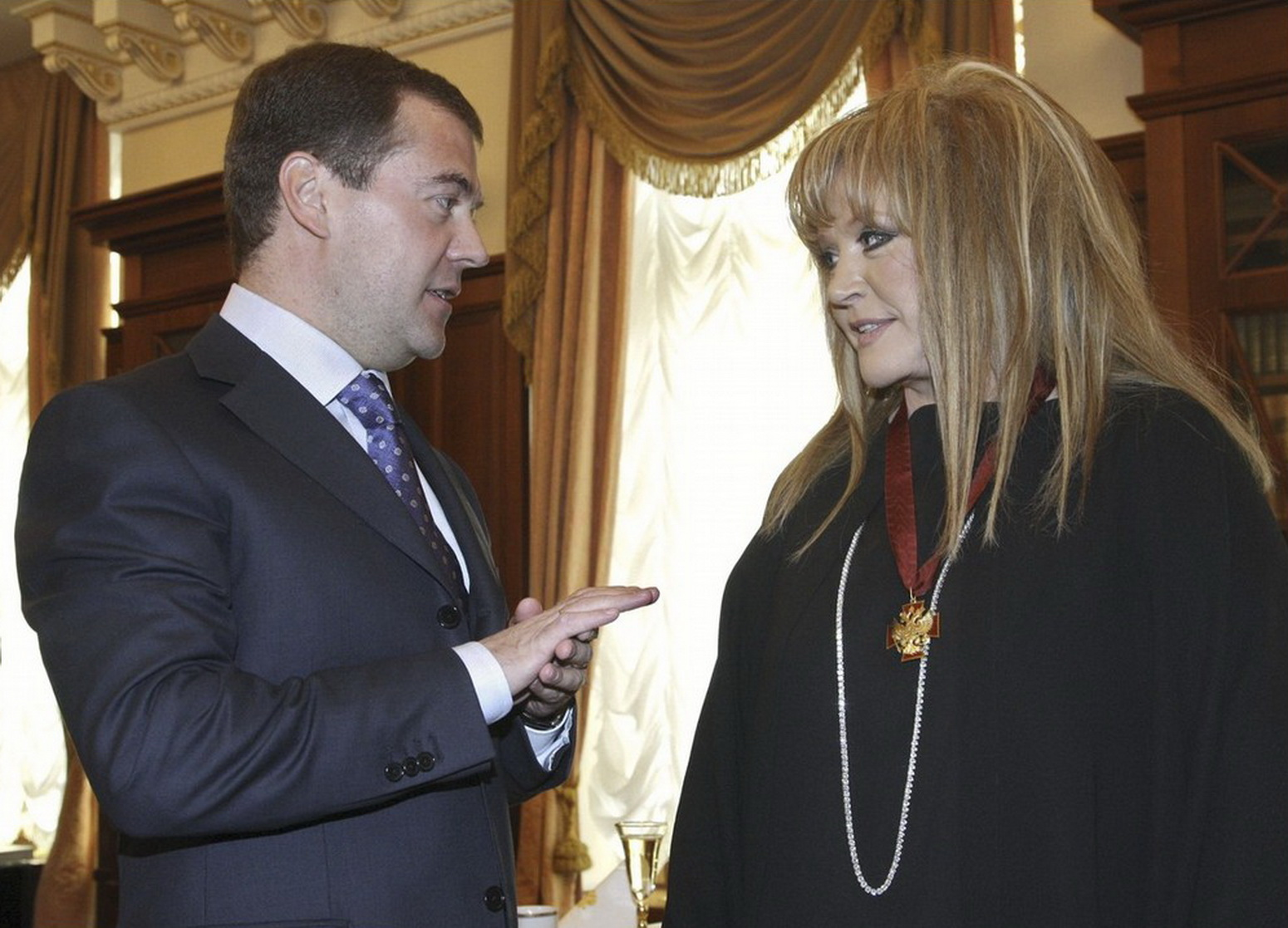
Pugacheva with Russian president Dmitry Medvedev, 15 April 2009

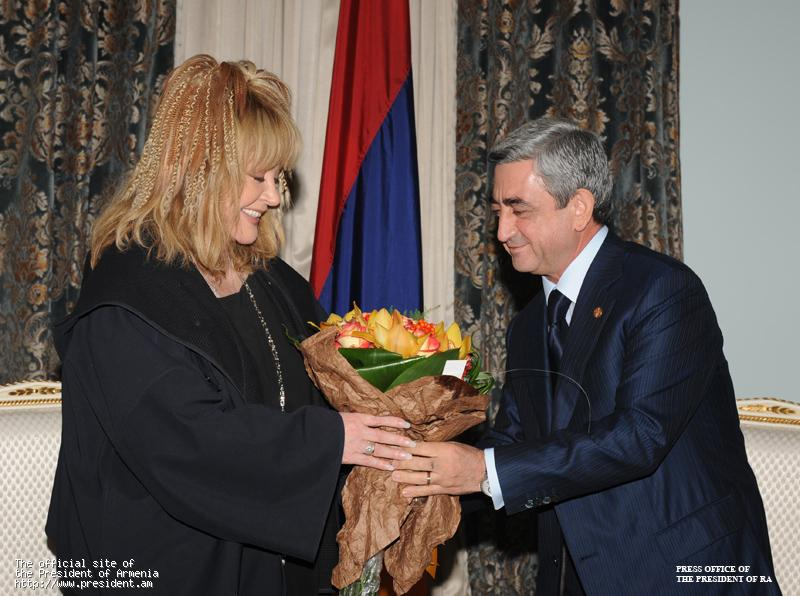
Pugacheva with Armenian president Serzh Sargsyan, 26 September 2009

Pugacheva's most notable title is "People's Artist of the USSR", the highest honor that could be bestowed to a musical artist in the state, awarded to her in 1991. While the lesser titles of "Accomplished Artist of the Russian SFSR", and "People's Artist of the Russian SFSR" had been already awarded to her in 1980 and 1985 respectively, the government was hesitant to award her its highest honor, reportedly largely because of statements and actions on her part that were inconsistent with the Party's agenda. Pugacheva is listed in the Russian Encyclopedia (2005) as well as in encyclopedias in other countries of the world, including the United States

In 1999, Russian president Boris Yeltsin awarded Pugacheva the Order of Merit for the Fatherland, 2nd class.

The Russian Assembly of Nobility awarded Pugacheva the title of Countess in 1994.

In 1995, she received the Klavdiya Shulzhenko Prize for her contribution to pop music.

In 2017, Pugacheva was included in the list of the "100 most influential Russians of the century" according to Forbes.

She was honored as one of the BBC 100 Women in December 2022.

Orders

- Order "For Merit to the Fatherland", 2nd class (15 April 1999)
- Order "For Merit to the Fatherland", 3rd class (15 April 2009)
- Order "For Merit to the Fatherland", 4th class (17 April 2014)
- Order of the Friendship of Peoples (Belarus, 23 September 2019)
- Order of St. Mesrop Mashtots (Armenia, 26 September 2009)
- Dostlug Order (Azerbaijan, 4 September 2009)

Titles

- People's Artist of the USSR (20 December 1991)
- People's Artist of the RSFSR (1985)
- Honored Artist of the RSFSR (1980)
- Honorary citizen of the city of Makhachkala (2006)

Awards

- State Prize of the Russian Federation (7 June 1995) – For outstanding contribution to the development of literature and art

=== Musical prizes ===
- Grand Prix of the Golden Orpheus International Vocal Competition (Bulgaria, 1975)
- Grand Prix "Amber Nightingale" at the XVIII International Song Festival "Intervision" in Sopot (Poland, 1978)
- The Golden Microphone award from Dynacord, part of Bosch as the best singer of the year in Europe (Germany, 1981)
- The Golden disc of the Track Music label for the album "Soviet Superstar. The Greatest Hits of 1976-1984" (Finland, 1984)
- Ampex Golden Reel Award for the album "Watch Out" (USA, 1989)
- Distant Accord FIDOF Award for contribution to the music Industry (USA, 1989)
- According to the ZD Awards, she was recognized as the best singer of the 20th century (Eastern Europe, 1999)
- Ovation Award in the category "Best Singer of the Decade" (2001)
- TV Triumph Award in the category Best Actress of the Year for her role in the musical film “Chasing Two Rabbits” (Ukraine, 2003)
- The prize of the Slavic Bazaar festival Through Art – to Peace and Understanding (Belarus, 2006)
- Platinum disc of the Melodiya label for multimillion copies of records sold in Russia and Eastern Europe (albums "Mirror of the Soul", "How Disturbing Is This Way", "Alla Pugacheva in Stockholm" and singles "Harlekino", "Million Roses", "Maestro") (2009)
- International professional music award “God of Aether” in the Record category, as a singer whose songs have been heard on radio and television in Eastern Europe for more than 20 years. In addition to Pugacheva, the award winners include Michael Jackson, Green Day, In-Grid, Valery Leontiev (2009)
- Inducted into the Top Hit Music Awards Hall of Fame (Eastern Europe, 2013)
- Robe of a professor at the State Musical Pedagogical Institute named after Mikhail Ippolitov-Ivanov. The award ceremony took place in the Great Hall of the Moscow Conservatory (2019)

Awards
Ovation
Preceded by	Living Legend Award; 1994; Alla Pugacheva	Succeeded by 1995 Joseph Kobzon

== Discography ==
=== Famous songs ===
- «Арлекино» (Harlequin)
- «Женщина, которая поёт» (The woman who sings)
- «Всё могут короли» (Kings can do anything)
- «Миллион алых роз» (Millions of scarlet Roses)
- «До свидания, лето» (Goodbye, summer)
- «Сонет Шекспира» (Shakespeare's Sonnet)
- «Балет» (Ballet)
- «Этот мир» (This world)
- «А знаешь, все ещё будет» (You know, it's still going to be)
- «Две звезды» (Two stars)
- «Я тебя поцеловала» (I kissed you)
- «Бумажный змей» (The Paper Kite)
- «Осенний поцелуй» (Autumn Kiss)
- «Песенка про себя (Также как все)» (A song about myself (Just like everyone else))
- «На Тихорецкую состав отправится» (The train will go to Tikhoretskaya)
- «100 друзей» (100 friends)
- «Айсберг» (Iceberg)
- «Паромщик» (The ferryman)
- «Волшебник-недоучка» (The half-educated Wizard)
- «Старинные часы» (Vintage clock)
- «Маэстро» (Maestro)
- «Цыганский хор» (Gypsy Choir)
- «Белая дверь» (The white door)
- «Надо же» (Wow)
- «Найти меня» (Find Me)
- «Алло» (Hello)
- «Superman»
- «Every night and every day»
- «Moscow Rock»
- «Любовь, похожая на сон» (Love, like a dream)
- «Я тебя никому не отдам» (I won't give you up to anyone)
- «Осенние листья» (Autumn leaves)
- «Позови меня с собой» (Call me with)
- «Свеча горела на столе» (A candle was burning on the table)
- «В воду войду» (I'll go into the water)
- «Осторожно листопад» (Careful leaf fall)
- «Речной трамвайчик» (River tram)
- «Голубка» (Dove)
- «Мадам Брошкина» (Madame Broshkina)
- «Тысяча лет» (A thousand years)
- «Будь или не будь» (Be it or not be it)
- «Я пою» (I'm singing)
- «Опять метель» (Another snowstorm)
- «Нас бьют, мы летаем» (They beat us, we fly)
- «Я летала» (I flew)

=== Original solo albums ===
Year (P)	Number	Original title	Title in English	Format	Label, country
1976		Золотой Орфей 76	Golden Orpheus 76	Live LP	Balkanton, Bulgaria
1977	C60 09799–2	Зеркало души	The Mirror of the Soul^{*}	Double LP	Melodiya, USSR
1979	C60 11975–6	Арлекино и другие	Harlequin and Other Songs^{*}	LP	Melodiya, USSR
1980	C60 14429–0	Поднимись над суетой	Be Beyond a Fuss of Life^{*}	LP	Melodiya, USSR
1980	C60 14935–6	То ли ещё будет	Something's Still to Come^{*}	LP	Melodiya, USSR
1982	C60 17663–6	Как тревожен этот путь	How Disturbing Is This Way^{*}	Double	Melodiya, USSR
1985	C90 21357–8	Ах, как хочется жить	Ah, How I Want to Live	LP	Melodiya, USSR
1985	WRM LP01	Watch Out	Watch Out	LP	World Record Music, Sweden
1986	C60 24717–8	...счастья в личной жизни!	...and Happiness in Private Life^{*}	LP	Melodiya, USSR
1986	C60 25059–0	Пришла и говорю	I'm Here Talking to You^{*}	LP	Melodiya, USSR
1990	SUCD 60 00122	Алла	Alla	CD	Melodiya, USSR
1991	10191-40191	Рождественские встречи 1990	Christmas meetings 1990	2LP	Russian disc, USSR
1992	STEREO R60 00887	Рождественские встречи 1991	Christmas meetings 1991	2LP	Russian disc, Russia
1995	SZCD0475	Не делайте мне больно, господа!	Don't Hurt Me, Gentlemen	CD	Soyuz, Russia
1998	Ex 98073	Да!	Yes!	CD	Extraphone, Russia
2001	АБП 0037	Речной трамвайчик	River Tram	CD	Alla, Russia
2002	АБП 0038	А был ли мальчик	Was There a Boy?	CD	Alla, Russia
2003	АБП 0055, МТ 702909–288–1	Живи спокойно, страна!	Live Peacefully, My Country!	CD	Alla & Monolit, Russia
2008	АБП 0055, МТ 702909–288–1	Приглашение на закат	Invitation to a Sunset	CD	Alla

^{*} Official English title.

=== Other albums ===
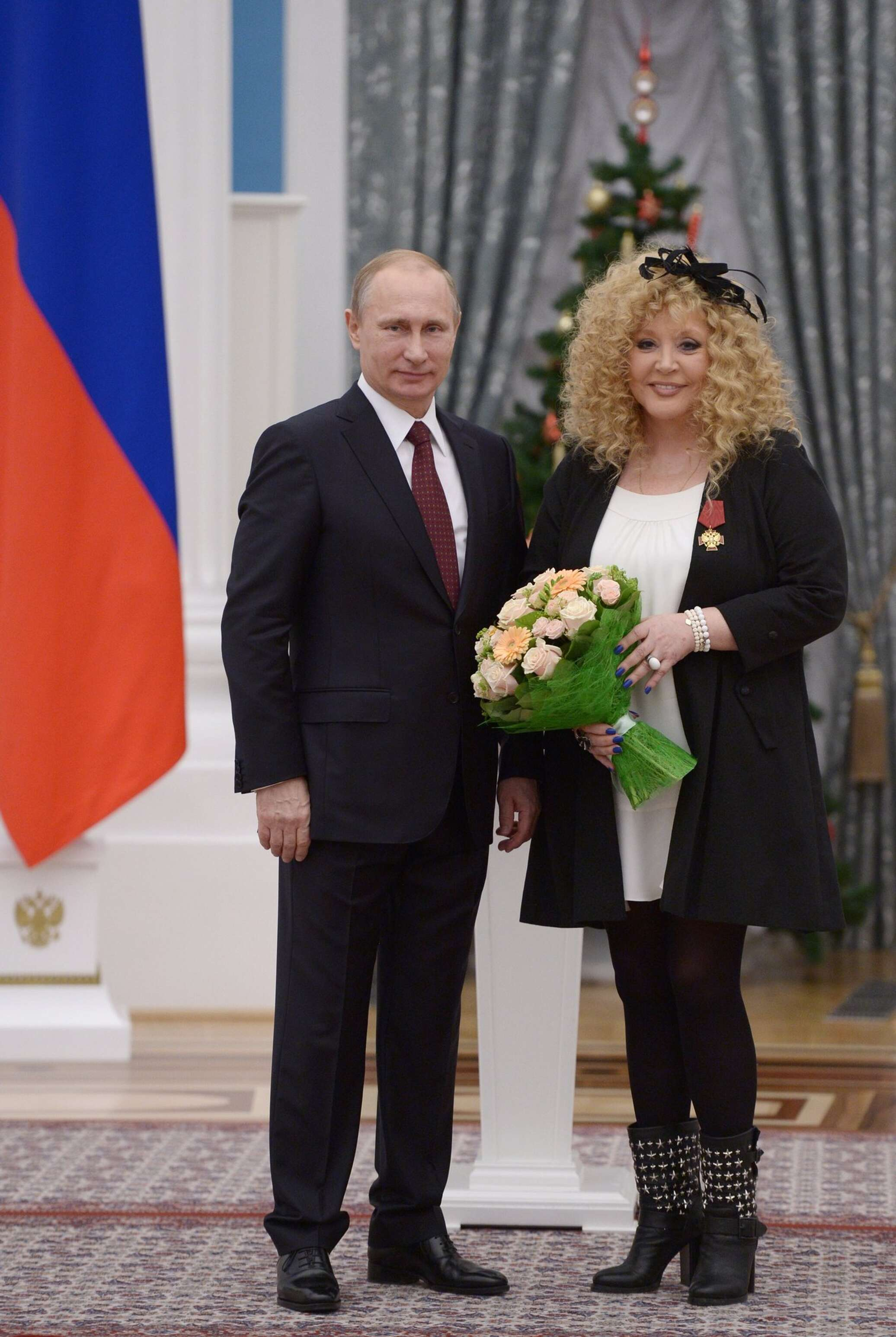
President Vladimir Putin awards the Order "For Merit to the Fatherland", 4th class to Pugacheva, 22 December 2014

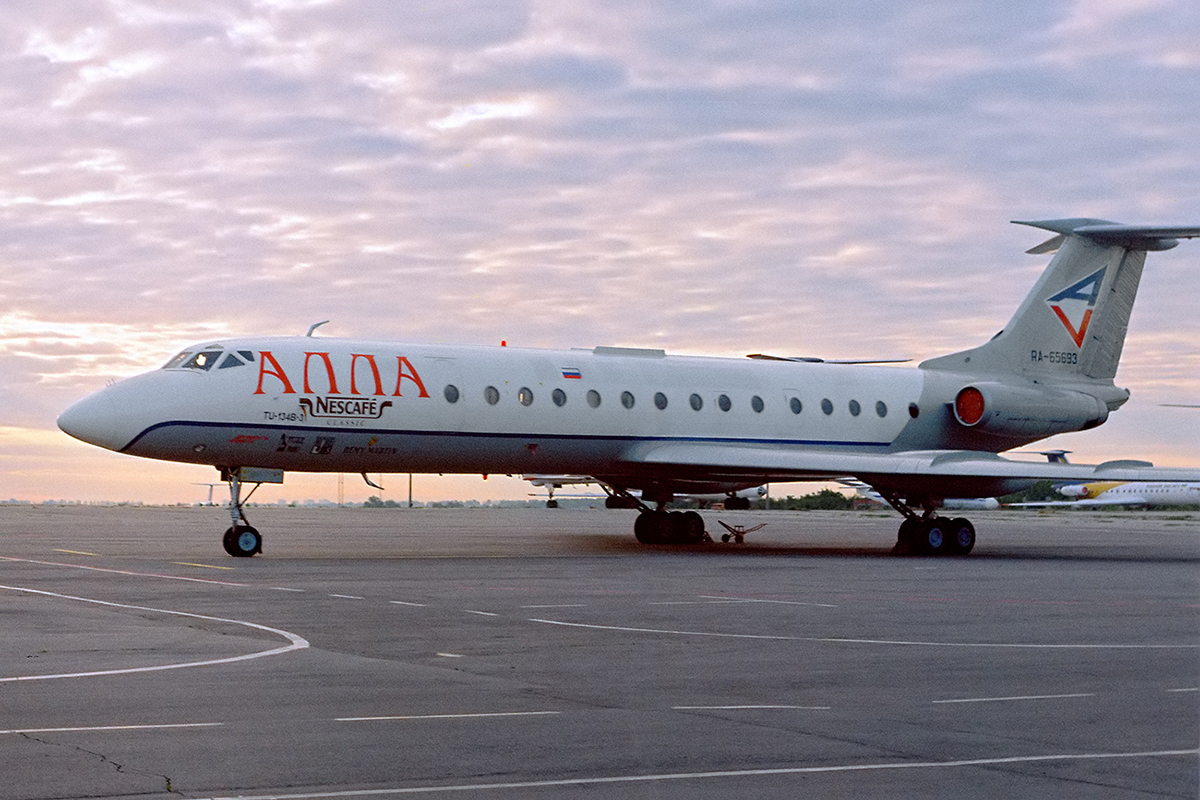
Airvita Tupolev Tu-134 at Kharkiv Airport in 1998. The aircraft was operated for Alla Pugacheva

- 1978 Alla Pugacheva (released in Japan) – compilation
- 1978 Ala Pugachova. Ogledalo na dushata (released in Bulgaria) – compilation
- 1979 Alla Pugacheva i Iosif Kobzon – split
- 1980 Diskoteka A – instrumental remixes
- 1980 Alla Pugatšova. Huipulla (Alla Pugacheva. At the Top; Kansan, Finland)
- 1980 Alla Pugačevova. Zrcadlo duše (Czech version of Zerkalo dushi)
- 1981 Alla Pugačova (Czech version of To li eshche budet...)
- 1981 Alla Pugatšova. Tähtikesä (Alla Pugacheva. Starry summer; Kansan, Finland)
- 1982 U nas v gostjakh maestro (Our Guest is the Maestro) – live / split
- 1982 Parad Planet – split
- 1983 Million Roz (released in Japan) – compilation
- 1983 Alla Pugačova. Dávná píseň (a Czech compilation)
- 1984 Alla Pugacheva – Soviet Superstar. Greatest Hits 1976–84 (World Record Music, Sweden) – compilation
- 1985 Alla Pugacheva – Soviet Superstar vol.2 (released by the World Record Music in Finland) – compilation
- 1988 Pesni vmesto pisem (Songs Instead Of Letters) – split with Udo Lindenberg
- 1989 Paromshik – (Ferryman) (Finnish release of Rechnoy paromshchik)
- 1991 Alla (Ritonis, Riga)
- 1994 Veryu v tebya (I Believe in You) – compilation
- 1995 Put' zvezdy (The Path of a Star) – compilation
- 1996 A 13 CD compilation of songs previously released only on LP and MC
- 1996 Poët Alla Pugacheva (Alla Pugacheva Sings; songs by Aleksandr Zazepin) – compilation
- 1997 Dve zvezdy (Two Stars; with Vladimir Kuzmin) – compilation / split
- 1998 Syurpriz ot Ally Pugachevy (Surprise from Alla Pugacheva) – tribute

=== CD singles ===
- 1997 Primadonna (Eurovision 1997)
- 2000 Bely sneg (White Snow)
- 2000 Madam Broshkina
- 2002 Eto lyubov (It's Love)

There is an unknown number of single and EP releases published all over the world.

== Other media ==
=== Films and TV appearances ===
- 1978 Teatr Ally Pugachevoy, Estonian Television
- 1978 The Woman who Sings, Mosfilm
- 1981 Lyubovyu za lyubov' (Love For Love) Mosfilm
- 1984 Vstrechi s Alloy Pugachevoy (Meetings with Alla Pugacheva), Soviet Central Television
- 1985 Prishla i govoryu (I Came and I'm Speaking), Mosfilm
- 1985 Sezon chudes (Season of Miracles), Odesa Film Studio
- 1989–2002 Rozhdestvenskie vstrechi (Christmas Meetings), Soviet Central Television, Ostankino, Public Russian Television, All-Russia State Television and Radio Broadcasting Company
- 1995 Zhdi i pomni menya (Wait for Me, Remember Me), Public Russian Television
- 1997 Laat de Leeuw (Late de Leeuw), VARA
- 2003 Za dvumya zaytsami (Chasing Two Rabbits)

=== Documentary film ===
Documentaries about Pugacheva's biography were shown on television in different European countries, including:

- "At Alla's" (Finland, 1979)
- "How does a Soviet superstar live?" (Sweden, SVT2, 1983)
- "Rock around the Kremlin" (France, Zaradoc Films, 1985)
- "Alla Pugacheva. Postcard from Tallinn" (Estonia, ETV+, 2019)

=== Video games ===
- 2023 - Atomic Heart, featuring remixes of "A Starry Summer", "Million of Scarlet Roses", "Arlekino"

== See also ==
- Russian pop music
- Honorific nicknames in popular music
- Russian emigration during the Russian invasion of Ukraine

== Notes ==
Encyclopædia Britannica repeats a claim on its features website that Pugacheva has sold around 250 million records. Other internet sources claim figures from 100 million to 250 million records. The Track Music, Ampex and Melodiya labels have confirmed the music recording certification of Pugacheva's albums and singles published during the USSR period. Of the albums published after 1991, official certification information is available only about the album “Live in Peace, Country!” from 2003 and "Invitation to Sunset" from 2008.

Awards and achievements
Preceded by Philipp Kirkorov with "Kolybelnaya dlya vulkana"	Russia in the Eurovision Song Contest; 1997	Succeeded by Alsou with "Solo"
