= Krisia Todorova =

Bulgarian singer (born 2004)

Krisia Todorova Крисия Тодорова
- Krisia Todorova, in 2026

Background information
- Born: Krisia Marinova Todorova; 1 June 2004 (age 22); Varna, Bulgaria
- Origin: Razgrad, Bulgaria
- Genres: Pop; rock
- Occupations: Singer, composer, songwriter
- Instrument: Vocals
- Years active: 2013–present
- Label: Seven-Eight Production

Krisia Marinova Todorova (Bulgarian: Крисия Маринова Тодорова, born 1 June 2004) is a Bulgarian singer, composer and songwriter.

Along with the Hassan and Ibrahim Ignatov twins, she represented Bulgaria at the Junior Eurovision Song Contest 2014 in Malta with a song she made "Planet of the Children". They scored in second place, while receiving the most points from the press votes.

The following year she released "Discover", the Junior Eurovision Song Contest 2015 official song, in Arena Armeec, Sofia., "Planet of the Children" and "I'd like to draw a dream" at the "New Wave Junior" 2015 festival, in Sochi, Russian Federation.

in 2015, Todorova and the Seven-Eight Production Company received the NASO Grand Prize for their contribution to the social development of Bulgaria.

== Early and personal life ==
Born in Varna on 1 June 2004, Todorova now lives in Razgrad. She is the daughter of Marin Todorov and Angelina Todorova. She has two sisters, Tiffany Todorova (born 2000) and Marina Todorova (2009).

She started studying music when she was six years old in a variety of music schools in Bulgaria, and is currently studying music at the "Centre for work with Children" in Razgrad with vocal teacher Svilena Decheva, where she sings and plays the piano. She studied at "Vasil Levski" Primary School in 7200 Razgrad, and since 15 September 2018 she is a student of the National School of Music "Lyubomir Pipkov" in Sofia.

Her hobbies include drawing and dancing – especially classical ballet. Her favourite subject at school is Mathematics, Man And Society and the English language. Her favourite singers are Ariana Grande, Lili Ivanova, Lara Fabian, Mariana Popova, Celine Dion, Christina Aguilera and Beyoncé.

== Career ==
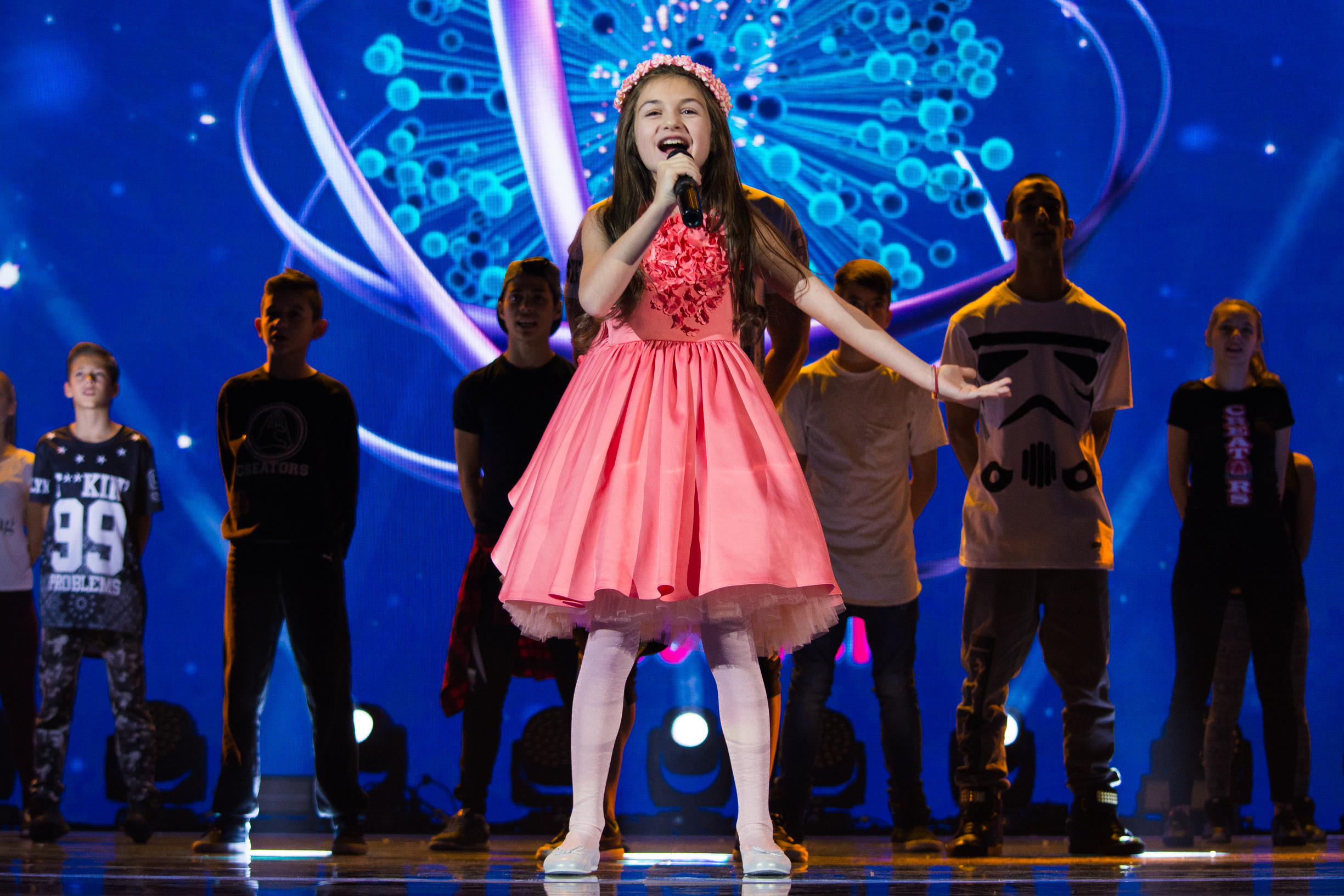
Todorova at the Junior Eurovision Song Contest 2015

Todorova has received seven awards from different national and international music competitions held in Bulgaria, but 2014 was her major breakthrough year. She gained national popularity with her participation in Slavi's Show on bTV, and later became part of the TV show – Zapoznaĭ se s malkite (Meet the Kids). Todorova first appeared on the show on 30 December 2013, performing "Listen" by Beyoncé. In March 2014, Todorova was chosen to sing the national anthem of Bulgaria, Mila Rodino and Moya Strana, Moya Bălgaria at the Vasil Levski National Stadium in Sofia, live in front of 42,000 people, for the opening of the UEFA Europa League Round of 16 match between Bulgarian side Ludogorets Razgrad and Spanish club Valencia.

In November 2014, Todorova along with twins Hasan and Ibrahim, represented Bulgaria at the Junior Eurovision Song Contest 2014 in Malta with the song "Planet of the Children". They finished in second place with a total of 147 points, just twelve points behind winner Italy. Todorova was subsequently received by President Rosen Plevneliev and was given an honorary distinction.

Todorova has appeared also in concerts with different Bulgarian orchestras. The orchestral part of "Planet of the Children" was recorded with the Pleven Philharmonic Orchestra under the baton of Yordan Dafov. In 2015 she was guest soloist with the Razgrad Philharmonic in the Fortissimo in Class programme under the baton of Maxim Eshkenazy, and one year later she also took part in the Fortissimo in Class programme in Ruse, in a concert conducted by Nayden Todorov.

In December 2014, Krisia performed again "The Planet of the Children" at the European Parliament. In March 2016, Fab Chart Music Awards in London nominated Todorova for the "Best Female Artist." Todorova has modeled for Junona Fashion House. From the year 2015, with the help of the music and her popularity, Krisia Todorova is in Bulgaria, one of the "spiritual leaders" of the country. From the year 2018, Krisia Todorova is an expert panel member of the EURO-PANEL.

== Discography ==
Date	Title	Covered from	Platform	Language	Ref.
30 December 2013	Listen; Santa Claus Is Coming to Town (in Bulgarian); За тебе бях I was for you	Beyoncé; Generic; Lili Ivanova	Audition: Slavi's Show	English; Bulgarian; Bulgarian	
14 January 2014	И ти не можеш да ме спреш And you can't stop me	Divna	Slavi's Show	Bulgarian	
16 January 2014	Hurt	Christina Aguilera	Slavi's Show	English	
23 January 2014; 21 May 2016	Я кажи ми облаче ле бяло Tell Me Little White Cloud (with Cvetelina Grakhich)		Slavi's Show; London	Bulgarian	
24 January 2014	Искам те пак I want you again	Cvetelina Grakhich	Slavi's Show	Bulgarian	
30 January 2014	Lane Moe	Željko Joksimović	Slavi's Show	Serbian	
31 January 2014	My Heart Will Go On	Celine Dion	Slavi's Show	English	
6 February 2014	Oh! Darling	Beatles	Slavi's Show	English	
13 February 2014	Wrecking Ball	Miley Cyrus	Slavi's Show	English	
14 February 2014	I Want to Know What Love Is	Foreigner	Slavi's Show	English	
20 February 2014	Светът е за двама The World is for Two (with Orlin Goranov)	Orlin Goranov	Slavi's Show	Bulgarian	
21 February 2014	Една българска роза One Bulgarian Rose	Pasha Hristova	Slavi's Show	Bulgarian	
28 February 2014	Nothing Else Matters	Metallica	Slavi's Show	English	
9 March 2014	Listen	Beyoncé	Concert "Krisia and Friends," Razgrad	English	
9 March 2014	Mercy	Duffy	Concert "Krisia and Friends"	English	
13 March 2014 21 May 2016	Моя страна, моя България; Moya Strana, Moya Bălgaria (also with Ignatov Brothers)	Emil Dimitrov	UEFA Europa League at Vasil Levski National Stadium; The Voice – Bulgaria; Wembley Arena	Bulgarian	
14 March 2014	Can You Feel the Love Tonight	Elton John	Slavi's Show	English	
23 March 2014	Ain't No Sunshine	Bill Withers	Concert "Simona and Friends," in Svishtov	English	
6 April 2014	Simply the Best	Tina Turner (Also Bonnie Tyler)	Concert "Gergana and Friends," Stara Zagora	English	
6 April 2014	One Way Or Another (with Tereza Todorova, Gergana Todorova and Simona Ivanova)	Blondie	Concert "Gergana and Friends," Stara Zagora	English	
6 April 2014	Proud Mary (with Iva Tsvetanova and Desislava)		Concert "Gergana and Friends," Stara Zagora	English	
11 April 2014	When You Believe	Leon Jackson (Also Whitney Houston and Mariah Carey)	Slavi's Show	English	
25 April 2014	Beyond the Sea	Bobby Darin	Slavi's Show	English	
30 May 2014	Since You've Been Gone	Rainbow	Slavi's Show	English	
27 June 2014	Трябва да знам I Need to Know	Magi Djanavarova	Slavi's Show	Bulgarian	
11 July 2014	Mamma Mia	ABBA	Slavi's Show	English	
5 September 2014	You Are the Voice	John Farnham	Slavi's Show	English	
19 September 2014	Вървя; Varvya; I'm going	Mariana Popova	Slavi's Show	Bulgarian	
10 October 2014	You Gotta Be	Des'ree	Slavi's Show	English	
October–November 2014 4 June 2016	Планетата на децата Planet of the Children (with Ignatov Brothers)	Original	Junior Eurovision Song Contest 2014 – Malta; Original music video Palacio Vistalegre, Madrid; Multiple	Bulgarian	
7 November 2014	When I'm Not With You	Angelika Vee	Slavi's Show	English	
28 November 2014	Amazing Grace	Various	Slavi's Show	English	
12 December 2014	All of Me	John Legend	Slavi's Show	English	
23 January 2015	Vivo Per Lei (with Boris Soltariyski)	Andrea Bocelli	Slavi's Show	Italian	
6 February 2015	All About That Bass	Meghan Trainor	Slavi's Show	English	
3 March 2015	Something's Got a Hold on Me	Christina Aguilera (Also Etta James)	Slavi's Show	English	
20 March 2015	Man in the Mirror	Michael Jackson and Keke Palmer	Slavi's Show	English	
3 April 2015	I Wanna Dance with Somebody	Whitney Houston	Slavi's Show	English	
17 April 2015	Dust in the Wind	Kansas	Slavi's Show	English	
25 April 2015	Why (with Ku Ku Band and Slavi Trifonov)	Antique / Elena Paparizou	Arena Armeec	English/Bulgarian	
1 May 2015	Beautiful, Beautiful	Francesca Battistelli	Slavi's Show	English	
8 May 2015	I Love Rock and Roll	Joan Jett and the Blackhearts (Also Britney Spears)	Slavi's Show	English	
22 May 2015	Happy	Pharrell Williams	Slavi's Show	English	
5 June 2015	Зная как I Know How		Slavi's Show	Bulgarian	
19 June 2015	Dream a Little Dream	Ozzie Nelson (Also Doris Day and Dean Martin)	Slavi's Show	English	
3 July 2015	Soy Mi Mejor Momento; I Am My Best Moment	Martina Stoessel (Also Violetta Zironi)	Slavi's Show	Spanish	
17 July 2015	Undo	Sanna Nielsen	Slavi's Show	English	
11 September 2015	Be Alright	Justin Bieber/Selena Gomez	Slavi's Show	English	
25 September 2015	Sweet Child o' Mine	Guns N' Roses	Slavi's Show	English	
9 October 2015	"#discover"	Original	Junior Eurovision Song Contest 2015 – Bulgaria; Slavi's Show	English	
23 October 2015	Flashlight	Jessie J	Slavi's Show	English	
6 November 2015	Shape of My Heart	Sting/The Police	Slavi's Show	English	
20 November 2015	Ti Si; You Are	Slavi Trifonov	Slavi's Show	Bulgarian	
17 November 2015; 4 December 2015	Not the only one	Original	Junior Eurovision Song Contest 2015 – Bulgaria; Slavi's Show	English	
18 December 2015	Summertime	Ella Fitzgerald	Slavi's Show	English	
31 December 2015	Ti Si; You Are; Wings (with Tereza Todorova)	Little Mix; Slavi Trifonov	Slavi's Show	English	
15 January 2016	The Voice Within	Christina Aguilera	Slavi's Show	English	
29 January 2016	I Knew You Were Trouble	Taylor Swift	Slavi's Show	English	
12 February 2016	Eternal Flame	The Bangles	Slavi's Show	English	
26 February 2016	Who Loves You	Alannah Myles	Slavi's Show	English	
11 March 2016	Mamma Knows Best	Jessie J	Slavi's Show	English	
1 April 2016	Recovery	James Arthur	Slavi's Show charity concert	English	
4 June 2016	Birth (with Boris Soltariyski)	Slavi Trifonov & Ku-Ku Band (as part of Kanaleto)	Palacio Vistalegre, Madrid	Bulgarian	
4 June 2016	Razdane		Palacio Vistalegre, Madrid	Bulgarian	
16 September 2016	Брала мома ружа цвете Brala Moma Ruja Cvete; Maiden picking hollyhock flower	Bulgarian folk song	Slavi's Show	Bulgarian	
23 September 2016	Visoko (Be Above It)	FSB	Slavi's Show	Bulgarian	
30 September 2016	Can't Stop the Feeling!	Justin Timberlake	Slavi's Show	English	
14 October 2016	Ze tebe biah I was for you	Lili Ivanova	Slavi's Show	Bulgarian	
28 October 2016	Radioactive	Imagine Dragons	Slavi's Show	English	
November 2016	At Last	Etta James (Also Glenn Miller)	Slavi's Show	English	
21 December 2016	Let it go	Idina Menzel (from Frozen OST)	National Palace of Culture, Sofia	Bulgarian	
30 December 2016	I Believe in Miracles (with Slavi Trifonov & Ku-Ku Band; Evgeni Dimitrov; Georgi Milchev; Hasan and Ibrahim)	Original	Music video	Bulgarian	
27 January 2017	Mary, Did You Know?	Mark Lowry/Pentatonix (Also Cee Lo Green)	Slavi's Show	English	
17 February 2017	I Have Nothing	Whitney Houston	Slavi's Show	English	
3 March 2017	Where is Bulgaria		Slavi's Show	Bulgarian	
10 March 2017	Girlfriend	Avril Lavigne	Slavi's Show	English	
24 March 2017	Sorry Seems To Be The Hardest Word	Elton John	Slavi's Show	English	
7 April 2017	Black Velvet	Alannah Myles	Slavi's Show	English	
28 April 2017	Colors of the Wind	Judy Kuhn (also Vanessa Williams)	Slavi's Show	English	
18 May 2017	Zvezda; Star		Slavi's Show	Bulgarian	
2 June 2017	Scared to Be Lonely	Martin Garrix/Dua Lipa	Slavi's Show	English	
16, 17 and 18 June 2017	Pesen za Bylgarija ("Song of Bulgaria") (with Slavi Trifonov, Ku-Ku Band, Evgeni Dimitrov)	Krisia Todorova, Evgeni Dimitrov	Arena Armeec	Bulgarian	
23 June 2017	One Last Time	Ariana Grande	Slavi's Show	English	
7 July 2017	And I Am Here	Mihaela Fileva	Slavi's Show	Bulgarian	
21 July 2017	Attention	Charlie Puth	Slavi's Show	English	
29 September 2017	Only Hope	Mandy Moore	Slavi's Show	English	
20 October 2017	Thelo na me nioseis	Nikos Vertis	Slavi's Show	Greek	
3 November 2017	We'll Embrace Again	FSB (band)	Slavi's Show	Bulgarian	
31 May 2018	I Believe in Miracles	Original	Jubilee Concert "10 years Bambini" DT Plovdiv, Bulgaria	Bulgarian	
5 August 2018	Can't Stop the Feeling!	Justin Timberlake	Concert "MUSICAL IMPULS"" Burgas, Bulgaria	English	
2019	Vitamin	Original	YouTube	Bulgarian	

Awards and achievements
Preceded by Ivan Ivanov with Supergeroy	Bulgaria in the Junior Eurovision Song Contest (with Hasan & Ibrahim); 2014	Succeeded by Gabriela Yordanova and Ivan Stoyanov with "color of hope"
