= Hasan & Ibrahim =

Bulgarian twin pianists

Hassan and Ibrahim Ignatov
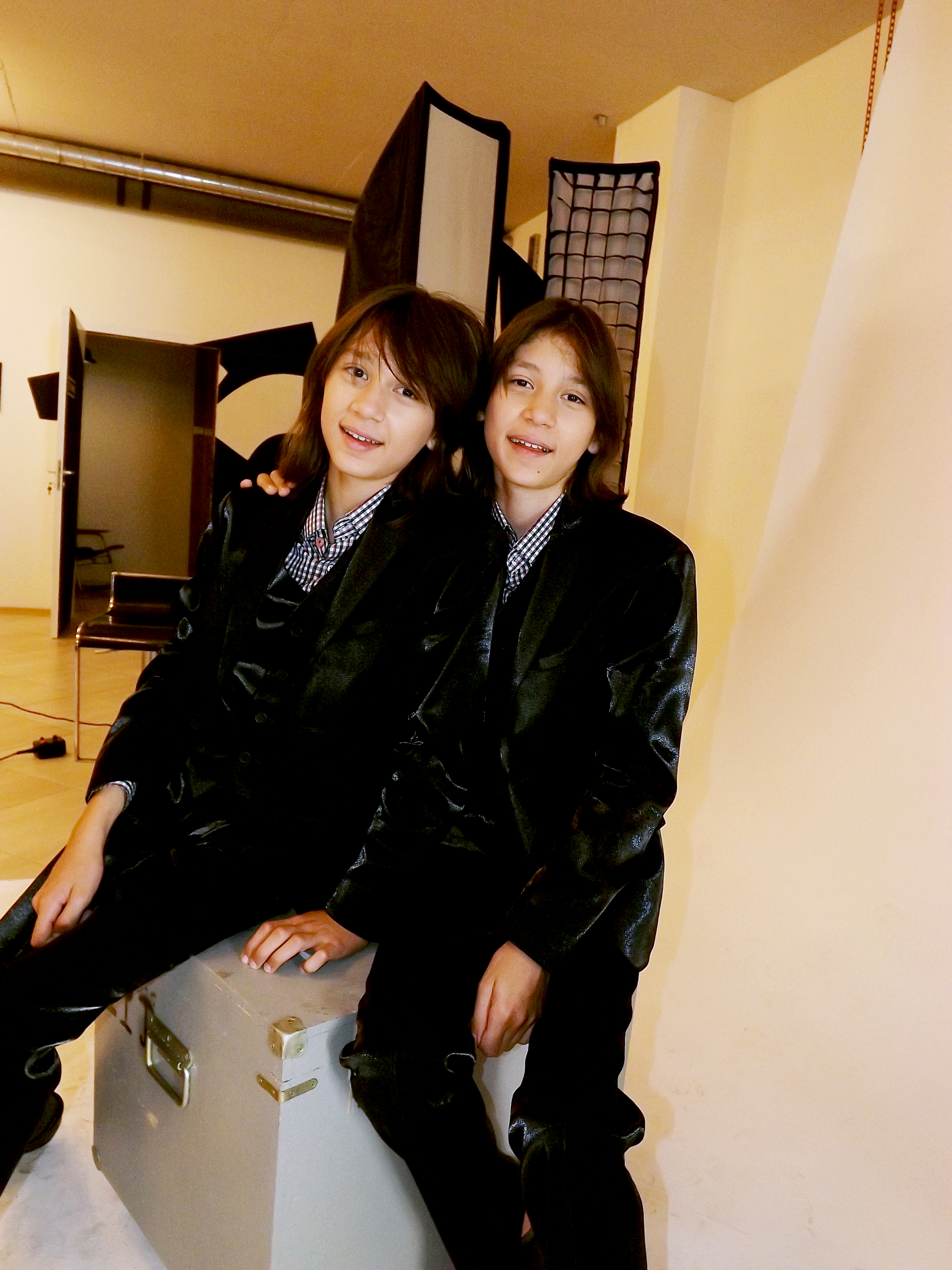
- Hassan and Ibrahim Ignatov - Photo Session 2015

Background information
- Born: Hassan Ignatov; Ibrahim Ignatov; 15 December 2003 (age 22); Shumen, Bulgaria
- Genre: Classic
- Occupations: Pianists, composers, arrangers
- Years active: 2014—present
- Label: KVZ Music
- Website: hassan-ibrahim-ignatov.com

Hassan and Ibrahim Ignatovi (Bulgarian: Хасан Игнатов и Ибрахим Игнатов, born 15 December 2003) are Bulgarian twin pianists and composers. Along with Krisia Todorova, they represented Bulgaria in the Junior Eurovision Song Contest 2014 in Malta with the song "Planet of the Children". Like Todorova, Hassan and Ibrahim also participated in Slavi's Show on bTV. They released their first collection of their own compositions at the age of 11.

Hassan and Ibrahim are holders of the Badge of Honor of Bulgarian President Rosen Plevneliev, also the Worthy Bulgarian award. Furthermore, they are holders of the Golden Badge and are Honorary Citizens of their hometown Shumen.

== Early life ==
Twin brothers Hassan and Ibrahim Ignatov were born on 15 December 2003 in Shumen, Bulgaria, to a family of musicians. Their father is Denis Ignatov of Bulgarian descent and their mother is Sebile Kyazimova of Turkish descent. They have two older twin sisters, Merlin and Nermin Ignatova, born 1997. At the age of five they both received their first musical guidance from their father and began studying piano professionally in September 2011 with music teacher Marinela Marinova. From 2015, they studied with the piano pedagogue Maria Gineva from the Varna Music School. Later, in 2018, they were in the piano class of Prof. Birgitta Wollenweber at the Hochschule für Musik "Hanns Eisler" in Berlin, Germany.

Currently they study at the Conservatorium Maastricht, in the Netherlands under Prof. Jeroen Riemsdijk and Prof. Joop Celis.

== Career ==
Hassan and Ibrahim Ignatov have received over 70 awards from different competitions for pianists from several domestic and overseas competitions, rich concert activity, special guests at TV shows, both in Bulgaria and abroad - Carnegie Hall, USA, UK, Poland, Malta, France, Bulgaria, Turkey, North Macedonia, Austria, Germany, the Netherlands, Russia, UAE and others. The Ignatov brothers have also won national and international competitions individually as well, including the International Fryderyk Chopin Piano Competition for Children and Youth in Szafarnia, International Piano Competition for Young Pianists "Carl Maria von Weber", Franz Schubert International Music Competition, Franz Liszt International Piano Competition, Dimitar Nenov National Competition, International Competition for German and Austrian Music, Pancho Vladigerov International Competition, Young Virtuosos Competition, VIVAPIANO International Piano Competition, Andrei Stoyanov International Competition for Young Pianists, Svetoslav Obretenov National Competition for Singers and Instrumentalists, Pera Piano International Competition, Ohrid Pearls Competition, and the International Rotary Music Competition among others.

At the age of eight they were part of the Dimitar Berbatov foundation. At the age of nine they participated in the Varna Summer International Music Festival of 2013. At the age of 10 they participated in the award ceremony for "Successful Children of Bulgaria" of the Dimitar Berbatov Foundation on Slavi's Show where they were noticed and further selected to participate in Junior Eurovision 2014 to represent Bulgaria along with Krisia Todorova. In the summer Hassan and Ibrahim took a master class of Maria Prinz. In September of that same year they performed their first concert with a symphonic orchestra with the Shumen Symphony Orchestra.

== Junior Eurovision Song Contest ==
On 25 July 2014 Slavi Trifonov announced on Slavi's Show that Bulgarian National Television had selected Krisia along with Hassan and Ibrahim Ignatov to represent Bulgaria in the Junior Eurovision Song Contest 2014. They had to perform a song with Krisia in Bulgarian, which the team of Slavi's Show successfully composed two months later. The song is called "Planet of the Children". The music was recorded by the Pleven Philharmonic Orchestra and Evgeni Dimitrov, while the lyrics were written by Krisia and Ivaylo Valchev.

On 9 November 2014 a team of 10 people – parents of the twins, vocal pedagogue Svilena Decheva, Evgeni Dimitrov, and reporters from two television stations – went to Valletta. Krisia, Hassan, and Ibrahim took 2nd place in the contest with 147 points.

== After Eurovision ==
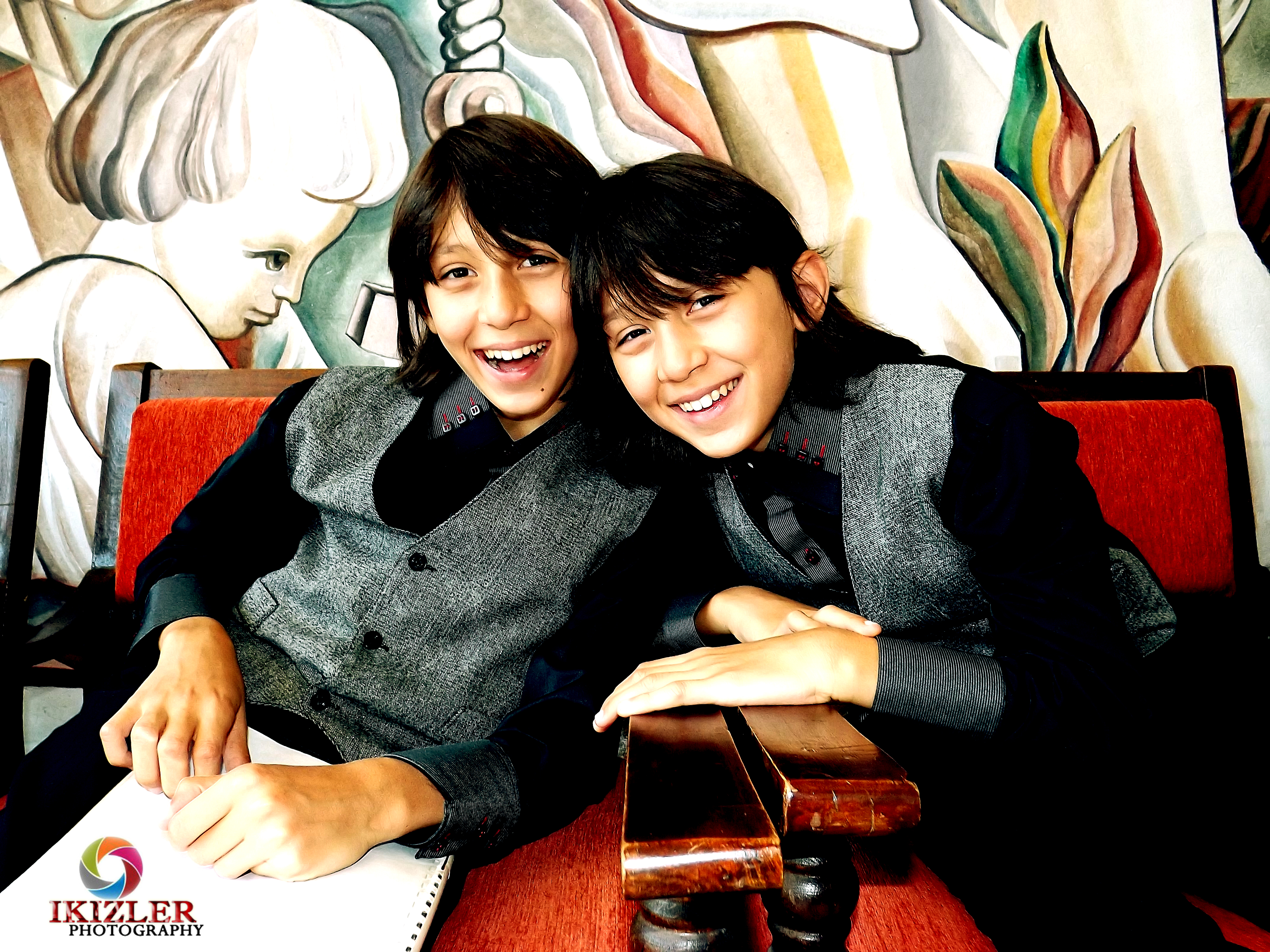

After their second-place finish in Junior Eurovision 2014, Krisia Todorova and Hassan and Ibrahim were invited by President of Bulgaria Rosen Plevneliev to participate in the Bulgarian Christmas concert, which is traditionally performed in the National Theatre at Christmas time. They visited the National Assembly, where deputies in the hall gave them a standing ovation, and Parliament Speaker Tsetska Tsacheva congratulated them for their Eurovision success. They were also welcomed as heroes in their hometown of Shumen by the mayor.

Their career followed by giving concerts in Moscow, New York, Vienna, Sofia, Dobrich, Dimitrovgrad, Pleven, Varna, Plovdiv, Sliven, Pazardzhik, and Razgrad.

Krisia, Hassan, and Ibrahim were defined by BNT as "Event of 2014.", and in the first days of the New Year 2015, they understand that they have brought "Junior Eurovision" 2015 to Bulgaria after Italy's refusal.

They won first place and "Grand Prix" for piano duo at the "Heirs of Orpheus International Music Competition". They also received two first prizes as solo artists and a second prize for piano duo from the "American Protégé Music Contest" among 640 participants internationally. Later the twins participated in the opening ceremony of "Dobri Voynikov Youth Choral Festival". They won first prize at the "VIVAPIANO International Piano Competition" in 2015. They received the award for "Worthy Bulgarian" from 24 Chasa and an Honorary Diploma for Talented Creative Development from the Ministry of Culture on 24 May, the Day of Bulgarian Education and Culture and Slavonic Literature. In the USA, Hassan and Ibrahim performed in Bulgarian schools in New York and the Consulate General of Bulgaria in New York At a ceremony in the Golden Sands resort they received honorary diploma of NASO (National Alliance for Social Responsibility) for outstanding achievements in the arts and culture and contribution to social and European development of Bulgaria.

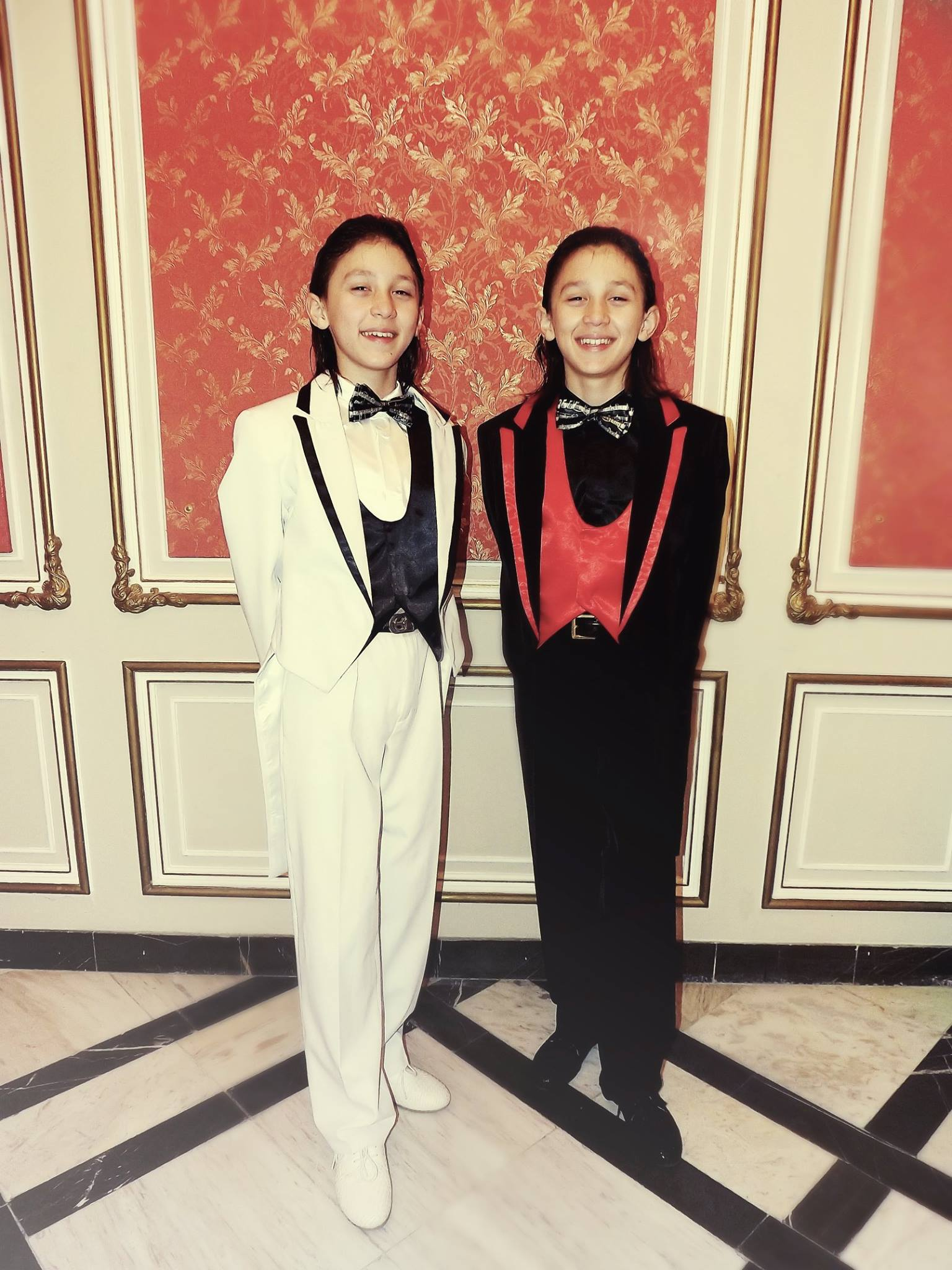
Concert with the Varna Philharmonic Orchestra in 2015

On 25 September 2015 Hassan and Ibrahim, together with Krisiya participated at the mega-concert of Slavi Trifonov and the Ku-Ku Band, which held in the National Stadium Vasil Levski in Sofia in front of 70 000 people. In JESC 2015 Krisiya, Hassan and Ibrahim participated in the opening ceremony as the runner ups of the last edition of the contest, and on the final night they performed a new version of "Planet of the Children".

In 2016 Hassan was the second prize winner in the International Chopin Piano Competition. The twins were invited by the artistic and executive director of the "Young Artist World Piano Festival" in Minneapolis, Minnesota. At the end of 2016, they released a new song with Slavi Trifonov and Krisia "I Believe in Miracles".

In 2017, they won the Special Prize for Composition from the "Music and Earth" International Competition.

Hassan won first and Ibrahim - second prize in the second age group of the "International Competition for Pianists and Violinists Pancho Vladigerov", and the Special Prize for Best Performance of the Work by Pancho Vladigerov. They also participated in the 3 in-a-row concerts "Ima takav narod" by Slavi Trifonov and Ku-Ku Band. In the summer of the same year, they are invited to participate in the Varna Summer Music Festival. In the autumn they become laureates and winners of the "International Competition Hopes, Talents, Masters" and the "International Piano Competition Liszt - Bartok - Kodaly" in Sofia. The duo continued their concerts actively until the end of the year, and also participated in the jubilee concert of the pianist and academician Nikolay Stoykov.

In the beginning 2018 they were special guests in the promotion of the Faculty of Pharmacy at the Medical University of Varna. Hassan and Ibrahim Ignatov started the competition season with first prize places and Grand Prix in several competitions, such as the "Musical Pearls Competition" in Varna, "International Competition Music and Earth" in Sofia, "XIII International Competition for Young Performers of Classical Musical Instruments" in Pernik, " International Competition The Voice of the Time" in Veliko Tarnovo, and the "International Youth Festival Slavic Ring" in Varna. In the summer of 2018, the young pianists were invited once again by Slavi Trifonov to participate in the concert-spectacle in London at the O2 Arena. On 13 July 2018, they were guests at the Bulgarian National Radio.

In August 2018, they emigrated from Bulgaria to Berlin, Germany, as they were accepted as "Young Students" (Jungstudenten) at the Hochschule für Musik "Hanns Eisler". They were in the piano class of Prof. Birgitta Wollenweber. After a very short time since the beginning of their education in Germany, they started giving numerous concerts in Berlin.

In April 2019, they published their 2nd collection with own compositions.

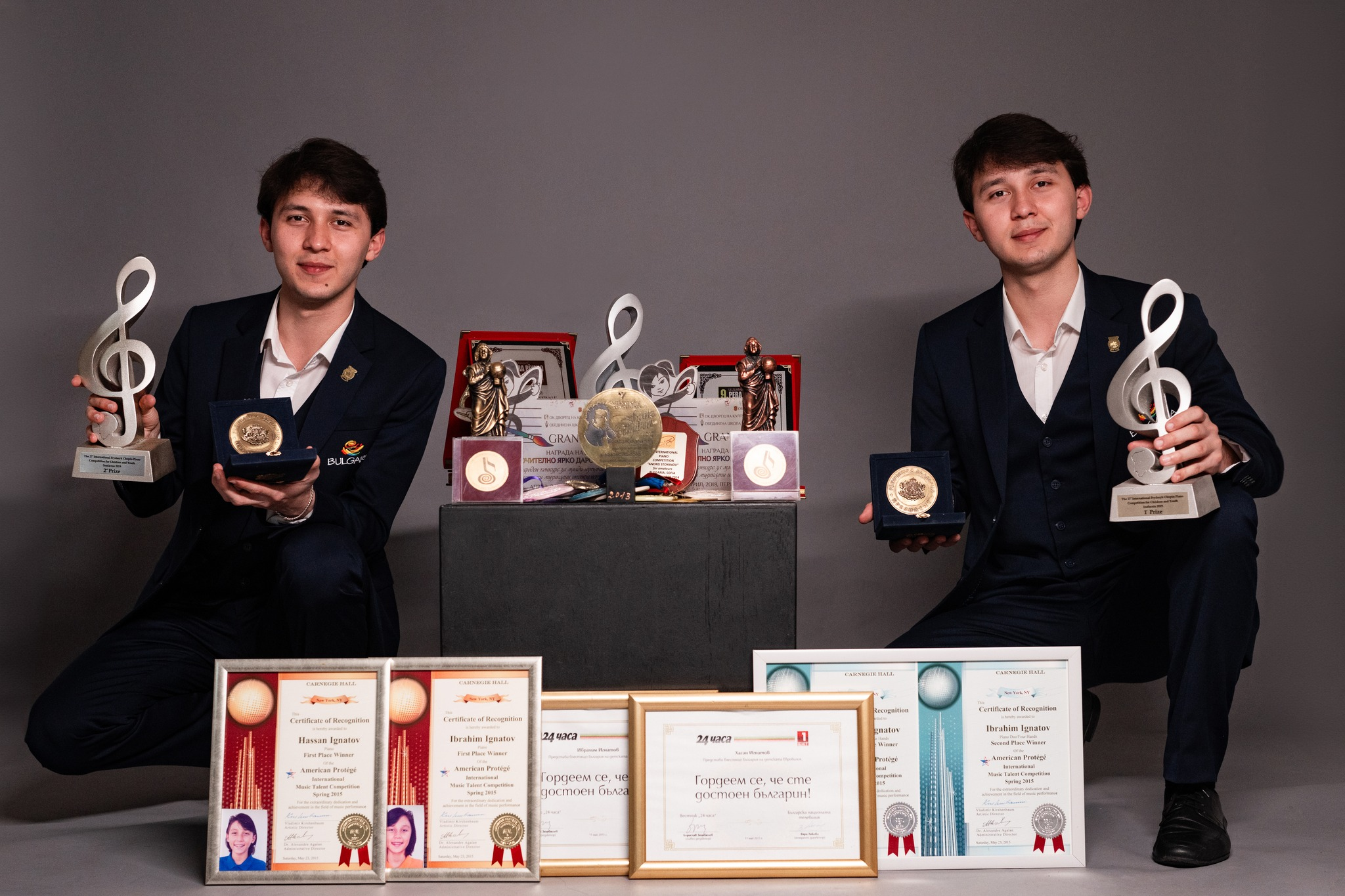
Photo session with awards (2024)

In the end of April 2019, they participated in the "First International Piano Competition for Young Pianists 'Carl Maria von Weber' " in Dresden, Germany. Hassan won the 2nd prize in the III Group (to 15 years old) and Ibrahim – the 1st prize in the IV Group, despite the fact that he was only 15 years old and competing with pianists up to 22 years old. Very soon after that, in May, they won the 1st and the 2nd prize in the III Group in the "International Fryderyk Chopin Piano Competition for Children and Youth" in Szafarnia, Poland – 2019. Also, the special award of the "Chopin Stichting Foundation in the Netherlands" in the form of a recital during the "Chopin Festival Groningen 2019" (October 26–27) was given to Hassan and Ibrahim Ignatov.

In June, during the "19th Munich Piano Podium for Young People 2019", they won in total 11 special awards:

- Piano Fischer Prize (both of them)
- Prize Virtuoso 2019 (both of them)
- Prize of the Friends of Artistic Museum Events, Trier (both of them)
- Chance Festival Prize (both of them)
- Yuri Grachew Prize, New York; (both of them)
- Junior Jury Award (Ibrahim Ignatov)

After a short summer break, the twins returned with new repertoire focused on Fryderyk Chopin. They started the new academic year with concerts in Groningen and Sofia. They were invited as special guests in Slavi Trifonov's Show "The grown-up children of the Show" on Christmas Eve 2019 – 7/8 TV. In the beginning of 2020, Hassan and Ibrahim were invited to participate as online jury members of Eurovision 2020 at Eurojury, Eurovoix's leading Eurovision TV show. On 8th of October 2020, they performed a concert with the Sliven Philharmonic Orchestra. After a couple of days, they participated at the opening of "Miss Shumen 2020".

In September 2021, they both won first prizes and the Grand Prix in the "24th International Music Competition "Hopes, Talents, Masters" " in Dobrich, Bulgaria. In October Hassan and Ibrahim Ignatov were invited to represent Bulgaria in EXPO2020 in Dubai, UAE in 2021.

On 10th of February 2022, they performed Beethoven's 5th Piano Concerto "Emperor" and Rachmaninoff's 2nd Piano Concerto with the Burgas State Opera's Orchestra. After a week, they were soloists of Sinfonietta Shumen.

Since September 2022, Hassan and Ibrahim are piano students at the Conservatorium Maastricht. In November, they performed as special guests at the "Evening of the Virtues 2022", organized by the "Foundation "For Our Children" ".

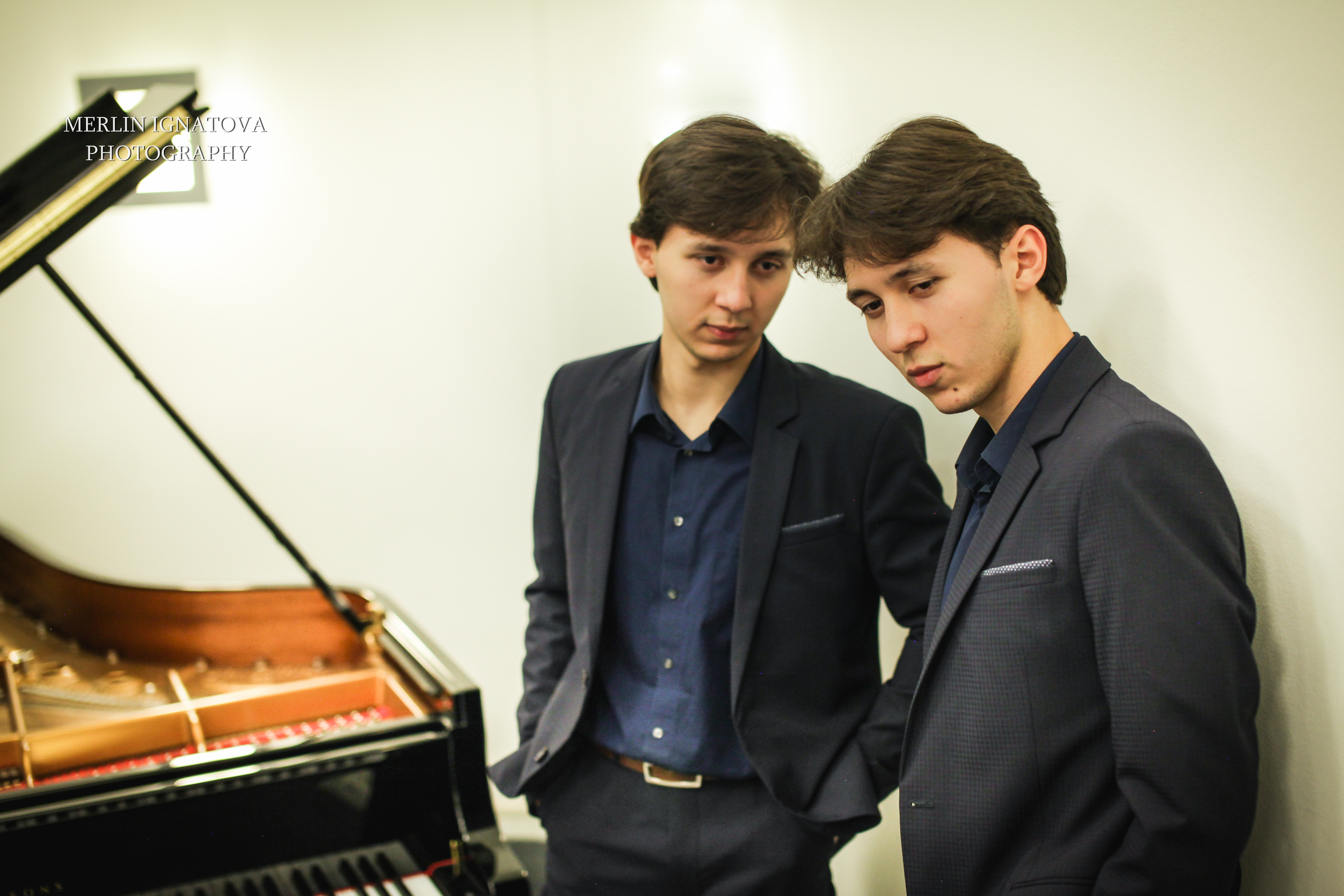
Hassan and Ibrahim in 2023

In March 2023, they gave series of concerts in Eindhoven, Sittard and Maastricht. They continued in April with their first individual concert tour "In the Name of the Music" in Bulgaria in the cities Sliven, Yambol, Burgas, Varna, Dobrich, Nova Zagora and Shumen.

They were among the invited guests in the festival "Les Pianos Folies 2023" in May. They performed at the Prom 2023 of the assistant pharmacists in Bulgaria. After a year, fulfilled with concerts, Hassan and Ibrahim Ignatov finished their first academic year with excellence.

In November 2023, they participated in the "International Piano Competition "Les Etoiles du Piano" " and were among the Top 10 pianists from 350 participants. They continued with their second concert tour "Klavirtuozno" in Bulgaria (in one year) with a completely different repertoire – in Yambol, Sliven, Shumen and Pleven.

Hassan and Ibrahim Ignatov published their 3rd collection with own compositions, especially composed for symphonic orchestra.

The twins made their debut as "Jonge Helden" as guests in Podium Klassiek, Amsterdam. (2024)

Awards and achievements
| Preceded by Ivan Ivanov with Supergeroy | Bulgaria in the Junior Eurovision Song Contest (with Krisia Todorova); 2014 | Succeeded by Gabriela Yordanova and Ivan Stoyanov with "Color of Hope" |
