= Bulgaria in the Junior Eurovision Song Contest 2015 =

- Junior Eurovision Song Contest 2015
- Country: Bulgaria
- Selection process: Artist: National selection Song: Internal selection
- Selection date: Artist: 8 September 2015; Song: 18 October 2015

Competing entry
- Song: "Colour of Hope"
- Artist: Gabriela Yordanova & Ivan Stoyanov

Placement
- Final result: 9th, 62 points

Participation chronology

Bulgaria was represented at the Junior Eurovision Song Contest 2015, as the host country, after Italy who had won the Junior Eurovision Song Contest 2014, declined the invitation from the European Broadcasting Union (EBU) to host the contest. The event took place at the Arena Armeec on 21 November 2015. National broadcasters Bulgarian National Television (BNT) and bTV jointly organised the national selection process, in order to decide who would represent them on home soil.

Submissions for the national selection shows opened in July 2015, for singers aged between 10 and 15. A professional jury of members from the music industry, selected the best entries to proceed forward to a non-televised auditions event that took place in August 2015. Twenty-four artists were chosen to participate in one of four semi-finals, which were broadcast live between 31 August to 3 September 2015. Jury members selected two artists from each of the four semi-finals, whilst the remaining artist from each semi-final was determined by a public televote.

The twelve chosen artists from the semi-finals, advanced into the grand final which was scheduled to take place on 8 September 2015. The winning participant was selected by a 50/50 combination of both telephone vote and the votes of jury members made up of music professionals. Gabriela Yordanova represented Bulgaria in the Junior Eurovision Song Contest 2015. The song that she performed at the Junior Eurovision Song Contest is "Colour of Hope" and she was accompanied by the runner-up of the election, Ivan Stoyanov.

Bulgaria finished 9th in the final with 62 points.

== Host country selection ==
Arena Armeec, in Sofia. Venue for the 2015 Junior Eurovision.

Following Italy's win at the Junior Eurovision Song Contest 2014, the European Broadcasting Union had given the Italian broadcaster RAI the first refusal to host the 2015 contest. However, on 15 January 2015, RAI declined the right to host the contest. The Executive Supervisor for the Junior Eurovision Song Contest, Vladislav Yakovlev, praised the Italian broadcaster RAI for their time looking into the possibilities of hosting, even though they made their début appearance in 2014, and further explained how the EBU were in a lucky position to have received bids from two countries.

The EBU announced later that day that they had received bids from two countries to host the contest; those countries being Bulgaria and Malta, who finished in second and fourth places respectively in 2014. Bulgarian broadcaster BNT confirmed on 15 January they had submitted a bid to host the 2015 contest. The national broadcaster for Malta, Public Broadcasting Services (PBS), stated prior to the 2014 contest that they would host again if they won.

On 26 January 2015, it was announced that Bulgaria had been chosen to host the 2015 edition, which took place on the 21 November 2015. It was the first time that the nation organised any Eurovision event. In March 2015, it was confirmed that Sofia would be the host city, with the Arena Armeec being the host venue.

== Before Junior Eurovision ==
=== National selection ===
In a joint organised event, Bulgarian broadcasters BNT and bTV, opened submissions between 3 and 23 July for singers aged between 10 and 15 to send their audio or video recordings to the Slavi Show team. After the deadline, a professional jury of music experts selected the best ones to proceed to the audition heats round. The selected singers were invited to perform live, in a series of audition heats, in front of a different jury made up of music experts and representatives from the three organisations to select the acts going forward to a live shows. The process to select the representative began on 17 August 2015 during the "Slavi's Show" on bTV, the programme in which Krisia, Hasan & Ibrahim were discovered. The selection procedure included internal audition heats, semi-finals and a national final which were broadcast during prime time. Over 90 kids participated in the auditions, where the judging panel consisting Slavi Trifonov and Evgeni Dimitrov, who were behind last year's entry "Planet of the Children", and Georgi Milchev and Filip Stanev judged the singers. A total of 24 stars were selected from the auditions to compete at the live semi-finals. From this stage of the show there were also hosts - Petya Dikova and Boris Soltariyski. The format was also changed from the auditions - the jury, now in a new lineup (Slavi Trifonov and Evgeni Dimitrov were joined by Orlin Pavlov, sent as representative from BNT), would select 8 finalists out of 12, with the audience in charge of voting through SMS to decide who would be the other 4 finalists. During the final the voting system was changed again - the winning participant who would represent Bulgaria on home soil, would be selected by a 50/50 combination of both telephone vote and the votes of jury members made up of music professionals. The song that the winning artist would perform at the Junior Eurovision Song Contest was chosen internally by the national broadcaster and announced at a later date.

==== Heats ====
Advanced to the semi-finals

Heat 1: 17 August 2015
Eleonora Ivanova	Elisabeta Tasheva
Eliya Todorova	Gabriela Yordanova
Ivan Stoyanov	Ivana Baldarkova
Kristian Pavlov	Liliya Stoyanova
Mariya Bakardzhieva	Maya Stoycheva
Mila Angelova	Nikol Kaneva
Nora Karaslavov	Rosen Petrov
Yuliana Mur	Zara Uzunova

Heat 2: 18 August 2015
Anna Drumeva	Dilyan & Kostadin Dyankov
Gabriela Ivanova	Georgi Todorov
Kristalena Stoyanova	Kristiana Kirilova
Lora Gerdzhikova	Mariya Bozhinova
Mariya Dimova	Patrisiya Simeonova
Simona Ivanova	Stanimira Ruseva
Svetlana Radoslavova	Teodor Palazov
Valentina Kuncheva	Viktoriya Glavcheva
Viktoriya Maneva	

Heat 3: 19 August 2015
Aleksana Stamova	Aleksandar Tanev
Aleksandrina Mehandzhiyska	Alisa Krasteva
Dimitrina Germanova	Eleonora Dimitrova
Elinor Palazova	Ivanina Balkova
Ivo-Konstantin Nachev	Katrin Tsolova
Pavel Pintev	Petya Georgieva
Preslava Petrova	Teodora Lilova
Teodora Todorova	Valentina Nikova
Yana Krasteva	Yana Sabanova

Heat 4: 24 August 2015
Borislava Tsekova	Daliya Isam Al-Atar
Evgeniya Stoyanova	Gabriela Gaydadzhieva
Hristina Grebcheva	Kristina Pashkova
Lyubomira Busheva	Moyra Yankova
Nikol Palascheva	Petar Bechev
Radko Petkov	Raya Krumova
Simona Krasteva	Stefani Aleksieva
Vesela Asenova	VIVA
Zhasmin Stoyanova	

Heat 5: 25 August 2015
Elena Bancheva	Gergana Todorova
Ivona Georgieva	Mariam Mavrova
Mariya-Magdalena Yordanova	Monika Petrova
Niya Yaneva	Pavel Mateev
Petya Kostova	Stilyana Stoynova
Valentina Demireva	Vesela Paunova

Heat 6: 26 August 2015
Aleksandra Zlateva	Andrea Nacheva
Andzhela Naku	Daniela Stoyanova
Dara Ekimova	Filip Filchev
Gabriela Tsvetkova	Gabriela Zhivkova
Ivana Vasileva	Kalina Popova
Preslava Tsankova	Valentin Kalenov & Nikoleta Sachkova
Viktoriya Anastasova	Viktoriya Tsankova

==== Semi-final 1 ====
The first semi-final took place on 31 August. Eleonora Ivanova, Pavel Mateev and Ivan Stoyanov advanced to the final. The semi-final was hosted by Petya Dikova and Boris Soltariyski. Six children each performed a three-minute pop song together with the 'Ku-Ku Band' - the resident band of "Slavi's show". The public was able to choose their favourite of the six to go to the final, by voting online and by SMS. The jury chose another two artists, making a total of three from each show and 12 finalists overall.

Key legend

Jury qualifier
Televote qualifier

Draw	Artist	Song (Original artist)	Result
1	Eleonora Ivanova	"Wrecking Ball" (Miley Cyrus)	Advanced
2	Aleksandrina Mehandzhiyska	"The Edge of Glory" (Lady Gaga)	Eliminated
3	Pavel Mateev	"Nikoi" (Grafa)	Advanced
4	Preslava Petrova	"One Night Only" (Jennifer Hudson)	Eliminated
5	Yuliana Mur	"Nashe lyato" (Lili Ivanova)	Eliminated
6	Ivan Stoyanov	"Mercy" (Duffy)	Advanced

==== Semi-final 2 ====
The second semi-final took place on 1 September. Lora Gerdzhikova, Simona Ivanova and Filip Filchev advanced to the final. The semi-final was hosted by Petya Dikova and Boris Soltariyski. Six children each performed a three-minute pop song together with the 'Ku-Ku Band' - the resident band of "Slavi's show". The public was able to choose their favourite of the six to go to the final, by voting online and by SMS. The jury chose another two artists, making a total of three from each show and 12 finalists overall.

Draw	Artist	Song (Original artist)	Result
1	Alisa Krasteva	"Price Tag" (Jessie J)	Eliminated
2	Lora Gerdzhikova	"Impossible" (Shontelle)	Advanced
3	Teodor Palazov	"New York, New York" (Liza Minnelli)	Eliminated
4	Kristiana Kirilova	"Dusha" (Diana Express)	Eliminated
5	Simona Ivanova	"Je Veux" (Zaz)	Advanced
6	Filip Filchev	"Easy" (Commodores)	Advanced

===== Semi-final 3 =====
The third semi-final took place on 2 September. Andrea Nacheva, Gabriela Yordanova and Dilyan & Kostadin Dyankov advanced to the final. The semi-final was hosted by Petya Dikova and Boris Soltariyski. Six children each performed a three-minute pop song together with the 'Ku-Ku Band' - the resident band of "Slavi's show". The public was able to choose their favourite of the six to go to the final, by voting online and by SMS. The jury chose another two artists, making a total of three from each show and 12 finalists overall.

Draw	Artist	Song (Original artist)	Result
1	Andrea Nacheva	"Nobody's Wife" (Anouk)	Advanced
2	Dimitrina Germanova	"Az iskam" (Revolyutsiya Z)	Eliminated
3	Nikol Kaneva	"Proud Mary" (Creedence Clearwater Revival)	Eliminated
4	Gabriela Yordanova	"Something's Got a Hold on Me" (Etta James)	Advanced
5	Borislava Tsekova	"Lale li si, zyumbyul li si" (Bulgarian folk song)	Eliminated
6	Dilyan & Kostadin Dyankov	"Give In to Me" (Michael Jackson)	Advanced

===== Semi-final 4 =====
The fourth and last semi-final took place on 3 September. Radko Petkov, Mariam Mavrova and Gergana Todorova advanced to the final. The semi-final was hosted by Petya Dikova and Boris Soltariyski. Six children each performed a three-minute pop song together with the 'Ku-Ku Band' - the resident band of "Slavi's show". The public was able to choose their favourite of the six to go to the final, by voting online and by SMS. The jury chose another two artists, making a total of three from each show and 12 finalists overall.

Draw	Artist	Song (Original artist)	Result
1	Radko Petkov	"Lane Moje" (Željko Joksimović)	Advanced
2	Nora Karaslavov	"I'll Be Your Shelter" (Taylor Dayne)	Eliminated
3	Petya Georgieva	"Vse taka" (Nevena Tsoneva)	Eliminated
4	Rosen Petrov	"Listen to Your Heart" (Roxette)	Eliminated
5	Mariam Mavrova	"Feeling Good" (Cy Grant)	Advanced
6	Gergana Todorova	"My Kind of Love" (Emeli Sandé)	Advanced

===== Final =====
The live final took place on the 8 September 2015. The results were determined by a 50/50 combination of both televote and the jury made up of music professionals.

Draw	Artist	Song (original artist)	Jury	Televote	Total	Place
1	Dilyan & Kostadin Dyankov	"I Don't Want to Miss a Thing" (Aerosmith)	1	2	3	12
2	Mariam Mavrova	"Think" (Aretha Franklin)	6	7	13	6
3	Pavel Mateev	"Vincero pedero" (Mario Frangoulis)	2	4	6	10
4	Simona Ivanova	"Heroes" (Måns Zelmerlöw)	8	8	16	5
5	Gergana Todorova	"Molitva" (Marija Šerifović)	10	9	19	4
6	Lora Gerdzhikova	"Slyap den" (Signal)	3	1	4	11
7	Ivan Stoyanov	"Zhestokaya lyubov" (Philipp Kirkorov)	12	10	22	2
8	Andrea Nacheva	"We Are the Champions" (Queen)	7	3	10	9
9	Filip Filchev	"I Feel Good" (James Brown)	4	6	10	7
10	Radko Petkov	"The Hardest Thing" (Toše Proeski)	9	12	21	3
11	Eleonora Ivanova	"Halo" (Beyoncé)	5	5	10	8
12	Gabriela Yordanova	"Osadeni dushi" (Lili Ivanova)	11	11	22	1

=== Song selection ===
On 16 October 2015, the title of the Bulgarian song was revealed. The song would be called "Colour of Hope" (Tsvetut na nadezhdata). It was officially presented on 18 October 2015 during the show "The day starts on Sunday with Georgi Lyubenov" on BNT. It was also revealed that Gabriela would be accompanied by the runner-up of the national selection, Ivan Stoyanov.

== Artist and song information ==
=== Gabriela Yordanova ===
Gabriela Yordanova (Bulgarian: Габриела Йорданова; born 5 November 2002 in Ruse, Bulgaria) is a Bulgarian singer. She began singing aged three and a half years old at the Vocal Group “Sluntse”(Sun). At the age of four she took part in her first International Competition for young performers, “RechniNoti”(River Notes), where she won first prize - from there she has gone on to have much success.

Yordanova has been on stage for eight years, taking part in many competitions in Bulgaria and abroad in places such as Kazakhstan, Russia, Hungary, Romania, Belarus, Italy. Since the age of eight she has been singing at “Milka Stoeva” Burgas with vocal pedagogy teacher Marieta Seklemova. Composer Plamen Mirchev-Mirona has been her vocal pedagogy teacher for the last 18 months.

Yordanova has performed with many Bulgarian pop music stars including Neli Rangelova, Orlin Goranov, Kamelia Todorova, Kamelia Voce, Ani Varbanova, and Petia Buiuklieva to name but a few. In 2014 she shared the stage with Lili Ivanova, the Prima of Bulgarian Pop Music at the Bulgarian concert which was part of the “Slavyanski Bazar” (Slavic Bazar) Festival. She has also performed with the Big Band of the Bulgarian National Radio as well as the Rousse Jazz Syndicate and group “Acapella”.

On 8 September 2015, Gabriela Yordanova was voted the winner of the Bulgarian national selection, receiving a total of 22 points from a 50/50 combination of both telephone and jury votes. Yordanova represented Bulgaria at the Junior Eurovision Song Contest 2015 on home soil with the song "Colour of Hope", finishing in ninth place with 62 points.

=== Ivan Stoyanov ===
Ivan Stoyanov (Bulgarian: Иван Стоянов) is a child singer from Burgas. He was part of the Bulgarian national selection for the Junior Eurovision Song Contest 2015, where he finished second behind Gabriela. Ivan took the opportunity to accompany her during the contest, where he and Gabi came ninth with 62 points.

=== Colour of Hope ===
(Bulgaria) "Colour of Hope"

Junior Eurovision Song Contest 2015 entry
- Country: Bulgaria
- Artists: Gabriela Yordanova & Ivan Stoyanov
- Languages: Bulgarian
- Composers: Slavi Trifonov, Georgi Milchev, Evgueny Dimitrov
- Lyricists: Ivaylo Valchev, Gabriela Yordanova

Finals performance
- Final result: 9th
- Final points: 62

Entry chronology
- ◄ "Planet of the Children" (2014)
- "Valsheben den" (2016) ►

"Colour of Hope" is a song by Bulgarian child singers Gabriela Yordanova and Ivan Stoyanov. It represented Bulgaria on home soil during the Junior Eurovision Song Contest 2015, coming 9th out of 17 entries with 62 points. It is composed and written by the same team, which created Bulgaria's previous Junior Eurovision entry, performed by Krisia with Hasan & Ibrahim.

== At Junior Eurovision ==
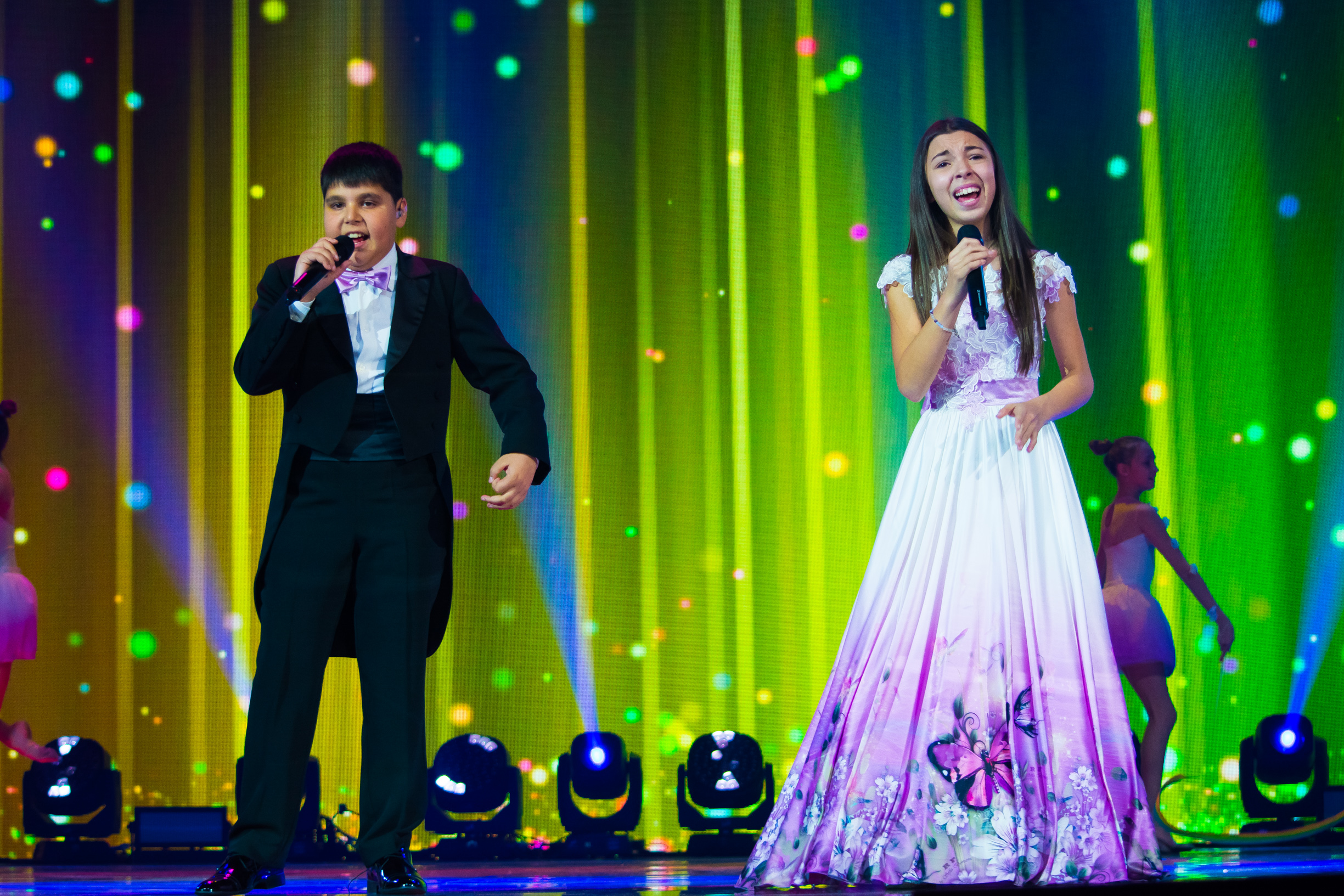
Gabriela Yordanova & Ivan Stoyanov performing at the stage of JESC 2015

At the running order draw which took place on 15 November 2015, host country Bulgaria were drawn to perform thirteenth on 21 November 2015, following Ukraine and preceding San Marino.

=== Final ===
Flanked by rainbows, the song starts with a focus on Gabi, who performs the first verse on the edge of the catwalk. Behind her, four rhythmic gymnasts perform intricate tricks with ribbons and balls. During the second verse, Ivan takes to the stage, and the final chorus ends the song with the two talented young performers harmonizing together.

=== Voting ===
The voting during the final consisted of 50 percent public televoting and 50 percent from a jury deliberation. The jury consisted of five music industry professionals who were citizens of the country they represent, with their names published before the contest to ensure transparency. This jury was asked to judge each contestant based on: vocal capacity; the stage performance; the song's composition and originality; and the overall impression by the act. In addition, no member of a national jury could be related in any way to any of the competing acts in such a way that they cannot vote impartially and independently. The individual rankings of each jury member were released one month after the final.

Following the release of the full split voting by the EBU after the conclusion of the competition, it was revealed that Bulgaria had placed fifth with the public televote and sixteenth (second-to-last) with the jury vote. In the public vote, Bulgaria scored 77 points, while with the jury vote, Bulgaria scored 14 points.

Below is a breakdown of points awarded to Bulgaria and awarded by Bulgaria in the final and the breakdown of the jury voting and televoting conducted during the final.

Points awarded to Bulgaria
Score	Country
12 points (Note: All countries received one set of 12 points to ensure no country finished with nul points.)	Ireland
10 points	
8 points	Italy; Malta
7 points	
6 points	Macedonia; Montenegro
5 points	Netherlands
4 points	
3 points	Ukraine
2 points	
1 point	Georgia; Slovenia

Points awarded by Bulgaria
Score	Country
12 points	Malta
10 points	Armenia
8 points	Slovenia
7 points	Russia
6 points	Albania
5 points	Serbia
4 points	Netherlands
3 points	Belarus
2 points	Ireland
1 point	Macedonia

==== Detailed voting results ====
The following members comprised the Bulgarian jury:

- Atanas Stoyanov
- Ivo Todorov
- Gergana Turijska
- Tedy Katzarova
- Haygashot Agasyan

Detailed voting results from Bulgaria
Draw	Country	A. Stoyanov	I. Todorov	G. Turijska	T. Katzarova	H. Agasyan	Average Jury Points	Televoting Points	Points Awarded
01	Serbia	8	5	10	4	5	7	2	5
02	Georgia		6		5		2		
03	Slovenia	10	10	8	7	8	10	7	8
04	Italy	1				2			
05	Netherlands	5	2	2	8		5	3	4
06	Australia	7		1		1			
07	Ireland	2	1					4	2
08	Russia	3	4		2	7	4	12	7
09	Macedonia	4	3	4	1	3	3	1	1
10	Belarus							5	3
11	Armenia		8	7	6	12	8	10	10
12	Ukraine	6		3					
13	Bulgaria								
14	San Marino			6	3		1		
15	Malta	12	12	12	12	10	12	8	12
16	Albania		7	5	10	6	6	6	6
17	Montenegro					4			
