= 7/8 =

7/8 may refer to:

- July 8 (month-day date notation)
- 7 August (day-month date notation)
- the Fraction seven eighths or 0.875 in decimal
- the 7/8 time signature; see Septuple meter
- 7/8 TV (Bulgarian TV channel)
