= Panayot Panayotov =

Panayot Panayotov may refer to:

- Panayot Panayotov (footballer) (1930–1996), Bulgarian footballer
- Panayot Panayotov (singer) (born 1951), Bulgarian pop singer
