= Emil Dimitrov =

Bulgarian singer and musician (1940–2005)

Emil Dimitrov Емил Димитров
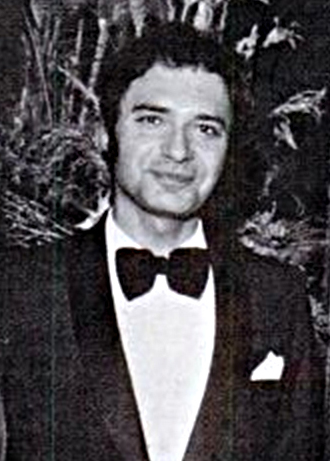
- Dimitrov in 1970

Background information
- Born: 23 December 1940; Pleven, Kingdom of Bulgaria
- Died: 30 March 2005 (aged 64) Sofia, Bulgaria
- Genres: Pop; Chanson
- Occupation: singer
- Instruments: Accordion; Piano
- Years active: 1960–1999
- Labels: Balkanton, Electrecord (Romania); EMI Pathé-Marconi (France); Riva Saund; Milena Records; Riviera (France); Accord (USSR); Veriton (Poland); Melodiya (USSR); Grafonola (Türkiye); Odeon (Mexico); Ariola (Germany); Polskie Nagrania Muza (Poland)
- Spouse(s): Greta Gancheva (married 1967–1968); Marieta Dimitrova (married 1968–1991, 2000)

Emil Dimitrov Dimitrov (Bulgarian: Емил Димитров Димитров; 23 December 1940 – 30 March 2005) was a Bulgarian singer, musician and composer. He is considered to be a legend of Bulgarian pop music, and one of the greatest Bulgarian singers of all time. He was popular for his songs "Ако си дал" ('If You Have Given'), "Моя страна, моя България" ('My Country, My Bulgaria'), "Нашият сигнал" ('Our Signal'), "Само един живот" ('Only One Lifetime'), "Джулия" ('Julia'), "Арлекино" ('Arlequine'), "Писмо до мама" ('Letter to My Mother') and others. Dimitrov was an extremely prolific artist, with 400 songs in his repertoire, and 280 of them being of his own composition; he released 30 albums in his lifetime.

He was born the son of the Bulgarian illusionist Fakira Miti and his French assistant. He went to study at the National Academy for Theatre and Film Arts in Sofia.

His career began in 1962, with the premier of his song Arlekino; it won third place at the Sopot International Song Festival that year, and turned him into a star overnight.

In 1970 he was signed to the French record company EMI Pathé-Marconi, which released his first French-language single "L'amour c'est toi". His song Monica (known in Bulgarian as "Моя страна, моя България" ('My country, my Bulgaria') sold out with a circulation of over 500,000 copies in Germany and 100,000 copies in Belgium, although, it was initially banned by Bulgarian communist censors for "bourgeois influence". In the modern day, it is considered to be an unofficial national hymn in Bulgaria.

He was married twice, and his son Emil was born from his second marriage in 1970.

According to the American magazine Billboard Emil Dimitrov sold over 40 million copies of his albums in Eastern Europe and the USSR.

He died on 30 March 2005, at 64 years of age.

== Discography ==
Bulgarian Evergreens

1. Моя страна, моя България (My country, my Bulgaria) – Emil Dimitrov; Director: Stilian Ivanov

Само един живот не е достатъчен (Only one life is not enough)

1. Ако си дал... (If you have given something...) – Emil Dimitrov
2. Писмо до мама (A letter to my mother) – Emil Dimitrov
3. Само тази нощ (Only tonight) – Lili Ivanova
4. Само един живот (Only one life) – Yordanka Hristova
5. Сбогом, Мария (Good-Bye Maria) – Panayot Panayotov
