= Viktor Kalev =

Bulgarian comedy actor and singer (born 1969)

Viktor Kalev (Bulgarian: Виктор Калев) (born 20 October 1969) is a Bulgarian comedy actor and singer born in Zlatograd. He was in the TV show Kanaleto, and then in Slavi's Show.

== See also ==
- Kanaleto
- Slavi's Show
