= Bulgaria in the Junior Eurovision Song Contest =

- Junior Eurovision Song Contest
- Participating broadcaster: Bulgarian National Television (BNT)

Participation summary
- Appearances: 7
- First appearance: 2007
- Last appearance: 2021
- Highest placement: 2nd: 2014
- Host: 2015
- Participation history: 2007; 2008; 2009; 2010; 2011; 2012; 2013; 2014; 2015; 2016; 2017 – 2020; 2021; 2022 – 2025
- For the most recent participation see Bulgaria in the Junior Eurovision Song Contest 2021

Bulgaria has been represented at the Junior Eurovision Song Contest since 2007. The Bulgarian participating broadcaster in the contest is Bulgarian National Television (BNT). The first entry at the 2007 contest was "Bonbolandiya" by Bon-Bon, which finished in 7th place out of 17 participating entries, achieving a score of 86 points. There has been four absences from the competition, those being in 2009, 2010, 2012 and 2013.

BNT's return to the contest in 2014 proved to be successful, when Krisia, Hasan and Ibrahim represented them with the song "Planet of the Children", achieving 147 points and finishing in second place out of 16 participating countries, it compared to Eurovision Song Contest 2017 when the country finished in 2nd place and gained the country's best ever result in a Eurovision competition until Dara's victory in the Eurovision Song Contest 2026. They hosted the contest at Arena Armeec in 2015. On 11 June 2016, Lidia Ganeva won the national selection "Decata na Bulgaria sa super", earning the right to represent Bulgaria at the Junior Eurovision Song Contest 2016, in Valletta, Malta. Ganeva performed the internally selected song "Magical Day (Valsheben den)" at the contest. She received 161 points and therefore finished in 9th place out of 17 participating countries.

Bulgaria withdrew from the contest in 2017, returning to the contest in 2021, where Denislava and Martin achieved 16th place out of 19 participating entries with the song "Voice of Love", before withdrawing again in 2022.

== History ==
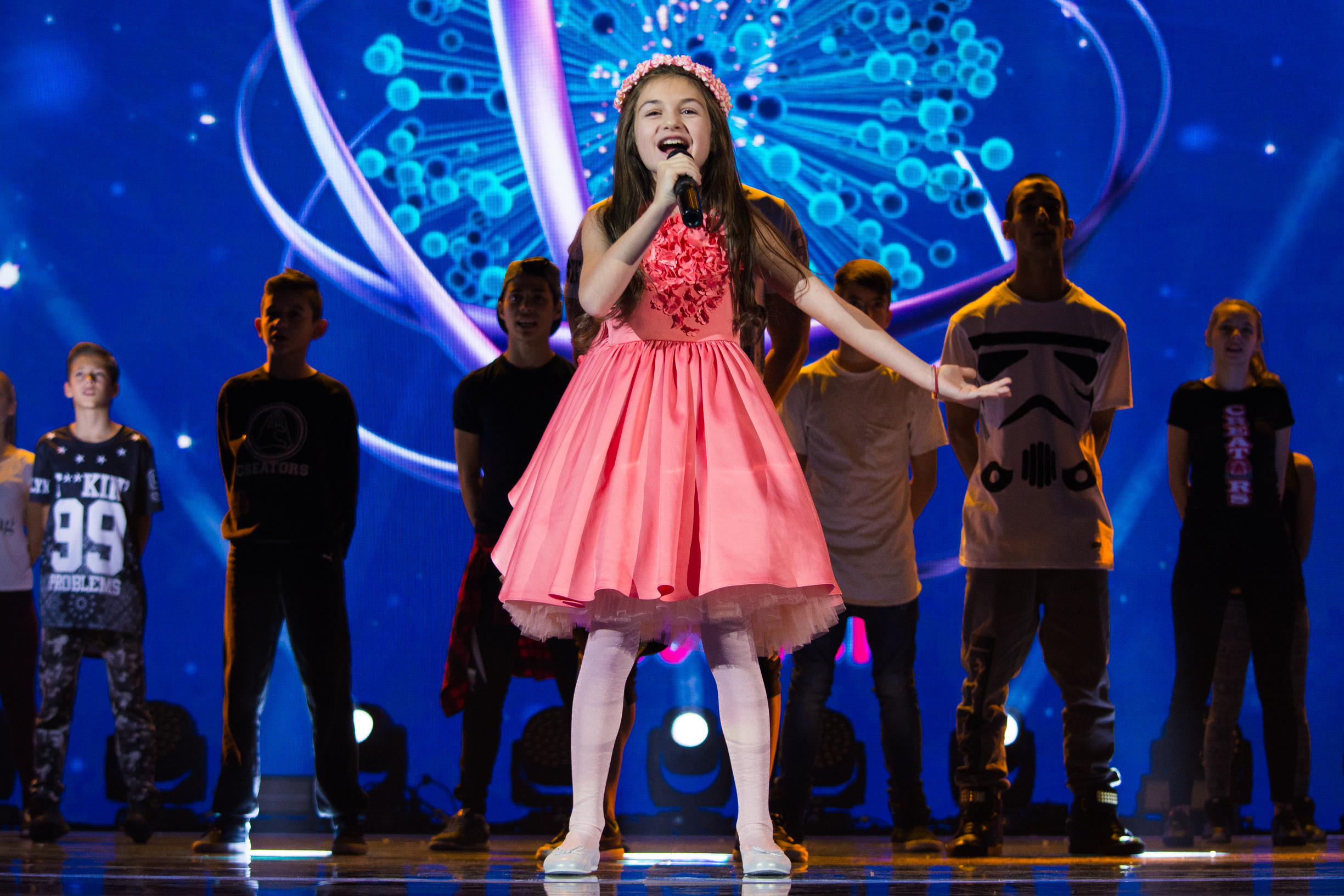
Krisia Todorova during the opening act of the Junior Eurovision Song Contest 2015 in Sofia

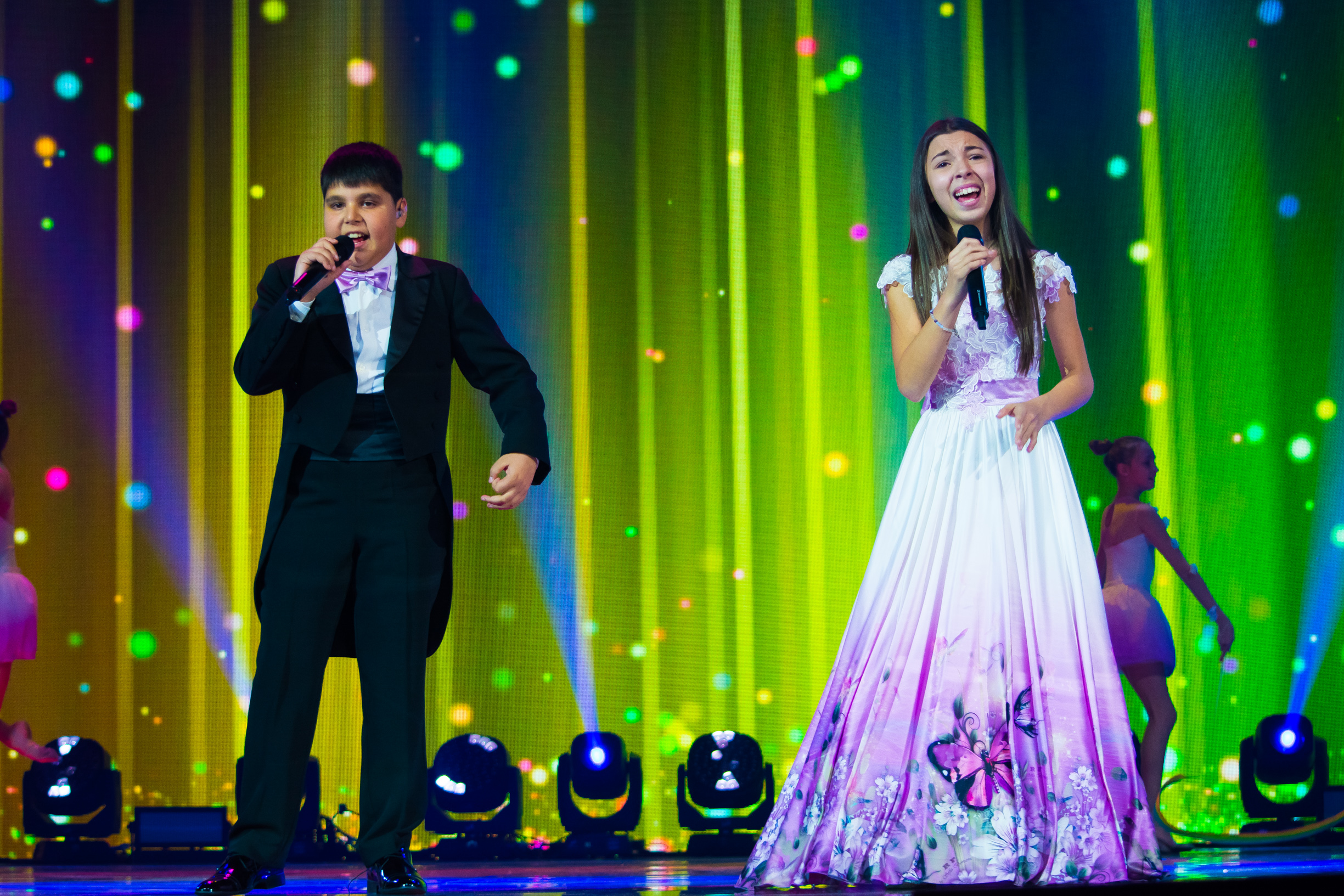
Gabriela Yordanova and Ivan Stoyanov at the Junior Eurovision Song Contest 2015

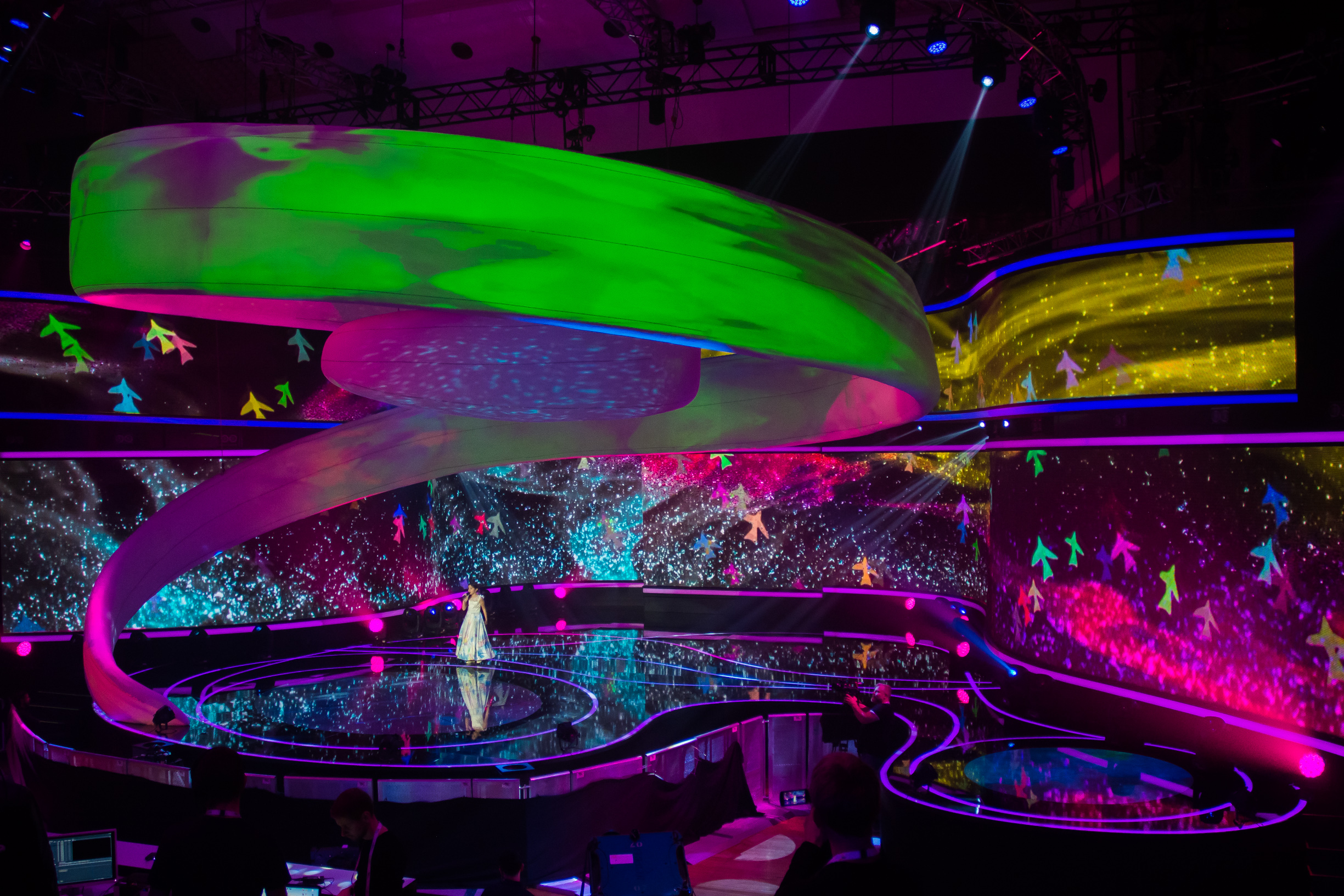
Lidia Ganeva at the Junior Eurovision Song Contest 2016 in Valletta

Bulgaria has entered the Junior Eurovision Song Contest six times, first entering in 2007. Bulgaria's first entry was Bon-Bon with "Bonbolandiya", which finished 7th at the 2007 contest in Rotterdam. Their second entry was Krestiana Kresteva with "Edna mechta", which finished 15th and last at the 2008 contest, receiving only 15 points. The Bulgarian broadcaster BNT withdrew from the 2009 contest, and Bulgaria did not compete in the contest in Kyiv or at the 2010 edition in Minsk. Bulgaria returned for the 2011 contest in Yerevan, then they took a break from the 2012 and the 2013 contests.

Bulgaria returned for the 2014 edition in Malta, earning their then-best result in a Eurovision competition when Krisia, Hasan and Ibrahim placed second performing "Planet of the Children". Their success helped reinvigorate public interest in the contest. According to Google Trends, Junior Eurovision was the eighth fastest trending event in Bulgaria for 2014, ahead of the Australian Open 2014 and New Year's 2014.

On 26 January 2015, it was announced that Bulgaria would host the 2015 edition at the Arena Armeec in Sofia on 21 November. The 2015 junior contest has been credited by some for providing BNT with the financial support they needed to return to the adult Eurovision in 2016, for their first Eurovision since 2013 - perhaps not coincidentally, their entrant in Stockholm was the Junior Eurovision's 2015 host, Poli Genova. In June 2016 BNT selected their artist for the Junior Eurovision Song Contest 2016 in Valletta, Lidia Ganeva. After initially confirming their participation for the 2017 contest in Georgia, Bulgaria withdrew their application due to restructuring within the broadcaster and did not appear on the final list of countries released by the EBU on 9 August 2017. On 28 April 2021, Bulgaria announced they would not return in 2021. However, on 2 September 2021, Bulgaria was confirmed to be returning to the contest after last participating in 2016. Bulgaria once again withdrew from the 2022 edition for unknown reasons, although they had originally confirmed participation.

== Participation overview ==
Table key
2	Second place
◁	Last place

Year	Artist	Song	Language	Place	Points
2007	Bon-Bon	"Bonbolandiya" (Бонболандия)	Bulgarian	7	86
2008	Krestiana Kresteva	"Edna mechta" (Една мечта)	Bulgarian	15 ◁	15
2011	Ivan Ivanov	"Superhero"	Bulgarian	8	60
2014	Krisia, Hasan and Ibrahim	"Planet of the Children"	Bulgarian	2	147
2015	Gabriela Yordanova and Ivan Stoyanov	"Colour of Hope"	Bulgarian	9	62
2016	Lidia Ganeva	"Magical Day (Valsheben den)" (Вълшебен ден)	Bulgarian, English	9	161
2021	Denislava and Martin	"Voice of Love"	Bulgarian, English	16	77

== Trivia ==
=== Selection process ===
Year	Selection process
2007	Konkurs za bulgarska detska pesen na Evroviziya 2007 with 10 participants
2008	Konkurs za bulgarska detska pesen na Evroviziya 2008 with 10 participants
2011	Konkurs za bulgarska detska pesen na Evroviziya 2011 with 21 participants (10 in the final)
2014	Internal selection
2015	Detska Evroviziya 2015 – Natsionalna selektsiya with 94 participants (12 in the final) (Artist); Internal selection (Song)
2016	Detsata na Bulgaria sa super with 15 participants (5 in the final) (Artist); Internal selection (Song)
2021	Internal selection

== Awards ==
=== Winners of the press vote ===
Year	Song	Artist	Place	Points	Host city	Ref.
2014	"Planet of the Children"	Krisia, Hasan and Ibrahim	2	147	(Malta) Marsa	

== Commentators and spokespersons ==
The contests are broadcast online worldwide through the official Junior Eurovision Song Contest website junioreurovision.tv and YouTube. In 2015, the online broadcasts featured commentary in English by junioreurovision.tv editor Luke Fisher and 2011 Bulgarian Junior Eurovision Song Contest entrant Ivan Ivanov. The Bulgarian broadcaster, BNT, sent their own commentator to each contest in order to provide commentary in the Bulgarian language. Spokespersons were also chosen by the national broadcaster in order to announce the awarding points from Bulgaria. The table below list the details of each commentator and spokesperson since 2007.

Year	Commentator	Spokesperson
2007	Elena Rosberg and Georgi Kushvaliev	Lyubomir Hadjiyski
2008	Elena Rosberg and Georgi Kushvaliev	Marina Baltadzi
2009–2010	No broadcast	Did not participate
2011	Elena Rosberg and Georgi Kushvaliev	Samuil Sarandev-Sancho
2012–2013	No broadcast	Did not participate
2014	Elena Rosberg and Georgi Kushvaliev	Ina Angelova
2015	Elena Rosberg and Georgi Kushvaliev	Vladimir Petkov
2016	Elena Rosberg and Georgi Kushvaliev	Milen Pavlov
2017–2020	No broadcast	Did not participate
2021	Elena Rosberg and Petko Kralev	Arianne
2022–2026	No broadcast	Did not participate

== Hostings ==
Year	Location	Venue	Presenters
2015	Sofia	Arena Armeec	Poli Genova

== See also ==
- Bulgaria in the Eurovision Song Contest – Senior version of the Junior Eurovision Song Contest.
