= Kanaleto (Bulgarian show) =

Bulgarian television comedy (1995-2004)

Kanaleto was a Bulgarian television comedy that was broadcast on Bulgarian National Television.

== History ==
The first episode of Kanaleto launched on 1 April 1995. The show aired weekly and covered politics and public life. The actors who played in the show were from the show Ku-Ku - they include Kamen Vodenicharov, Viktor Kalev, Marta Vachkova, Slavi Trifonov, Ivaylo Bojitchkov, Toncho Tokmakchiev and other actors. In 1996 were organized the first major tour in the Bulgarian show business - "Каналето под небето"("Kanaleto under the sky") and produces a video after its completion. In Plovdiv gather over 37 000 people on Plovdiv's stadium at the concert.

Kamen Vodenicharov, Slavi Trifonov and Lyuben Dilov Jr. have different views on the future of the show. Eventually Slavi Trifonov and Lyuben Dilov Jr. They go on their own way. Kamen Vodenicharov, Viktor Kalev, Marta Vachkova and Toncho Tokmakchiev remain to work in the show. In the coming years the budget for the show is significantly limited. The show is stopped in 2004. Successor of the Kanaleto is Шоуто на Канала(The Show of the Channel) launched in 2007.

== Discography ==
Also the show makes music songs.

- Roma TV (1995)
- Zhalta knizhka (1996)
- Ragay chushki v boba (1995)
- Ala nyamash men (1996)
- Strasti (2000)
