= Arlekino =

1975 song by Alla Pugacheva

Single by Alla Pugacheva

from the album Arlekino i drugiye
- Language: Russian
- B-side: "Posidim pookayem"; "Ty snishsya mne"
- Released: 21 June 1975
- Recorded: 1975
- Genre: Pop
- Length: 4:30
- Label: Melodiya
- Composer: Emil Dimitrov
- Lyricist: Boris Barkas

Music video
- "Arlekino" on YouTube

"Arlekino" (Russian: Арлекино; English: Harlequin) is a song by Russian singer Alla Pugacheva. The song was co-authored by Bulgarian composer Emil Dimitrov and Russian poet Boris Barkas. In 1975, the song was recorded in the studio and released on the singer's first solo extended play Arlekino. It simultaneously became a staple at live performances. For this song, Alla Pugacheva was awarded the Grand Prix of the 1975 Golden Orpheus international song contest in Bulgaria.

The single became an international hit in Eastern Europe, the Baltics and Central Asia. It was most popular in Bulgaria and Germany. Total sales of the single in the former USSR and the world amounted to 14 million copies.

In 2023, a remix of the song created by Geoffplaysguitar became the soundtrack to the game Atomic Heart.

== Background ==
Initially, it was planned that another artist would represent the Soviet Union on Golden Orpheus international song contest, but in the end this honor fell to Alla Pugacheva, the soloist of Vesyolye Rebyata. According to the terms of the contest, it was necessary to perform three songs, including one song in Bulgarian. "Arlekino" came to Pugacheva from Emil Dimitrov himself; as it turned out, it was a song from his repertoire, with which he won the contest in Sopot in 1964. Pugacheva liked the melody, and the Russian text was written by Boris Barkas.

Pugacheva came up with the image of a sad clown for performances and the famous laugh that sounds between verses. She later assessed the song as an ideal combination of text, music and arrangement, which gave her the freedom of creative approach to creating an image, facial expressions, gestures for performance.

== Golden Orpheus performances ==
On 3 June 1975, the Golden Orpheus competition began in Bulgaria. Pugacheva successfully reached the final, where she performed the song "Ty snishsya mne", followed by "Arlekino", and the audience asked her to perform an encore. On 7 June, the final evening took place, when all the winners performed their songs. With the prepared number of Pugacheva, when she was supposed to appear on a huge hand, there was a hitch, because the British singer Carl Wayne decided to perform his song for an encore, and at that time a hand with Pugacheva fell on the stage. As a result, Pugacheva stayed on stage until the end of the song and sang the final phrase for Wayne. Pugacheva herself performed "Arlekino" that evening as an encore.

The contest was broadcast throughout Bulgaria, it was also watched by eight-year-old Philipp Kirkorov, the future singer and husband of Pugacheva. In the Soviet Union, however, the competition was shown only a month later due to the negative reaction of the chairman of Gosteleradio Sergey Lapin.

== Release ==
This EP was released on 21 June 1975 in the Soviet Union. It was her first solo EP (with studio recordings); before this, she appeared only on compilations. Alongside the lead single "Arlekino", there were two B-sides: "Posidim, pookayem" and "Ty snishsya mne". Although all songs saw popularity in the USSR, they were released only on her second studio album Arlekino i drugiye in 1979.

After Pugacheva's win in the 1975 Golden Orpheus international song contest, Balkanton released a series of live recordings from the contest. All songs in Russian.

Sales of the single amounted to a record 14 million copies.

== German version ==
"Harlekino"

Single by Alla Pugacheva
- B-side: "Auch ohne Dich werde ich leben"
- Released: 1976
- Recorded: April 1976
- Genre: Pop
- Length: 4:30
- Label: Amiga
- Composer: Emil Dimitrov
- Lyricists: Wolfgang Brandenstein; Arndt Bause

Alla Pugacheva singles chronology
"Arlekino" (1975)	"Harlekino" (1976)	"Do svidanya, leto" (1976)

This single was recorded by Pugacheva during her tour in the GDR in April 1976 and released in Germany (GDR) by Amiga in 1976. According to the official discography of the singer, it is her third single. The recording of the song "Harlekino" in German was due to the song's high popularity in East Germany.

In addition to being released as a single, the German version of the song "Harlekino" was released on two compilations "Amiga Box 3-76" and "Die grossen Erfolge '76".

== Track listing ==
7" single (USSR)

Side one
No.	Title	Lyrics	Music	Length
1.	"Арлекино" ("Arlekino")	Boris Barkas	Emil Dimitrov; Pavel Slobodkin (reworking)	4:30
Total length:				4:30

Side two
No.	Title	Lyrics	Music	Length
2.	"Посидим, поокаем" ("Posodim pookayem")	Ilya Reznik	Aleksandr Muromtsev	3:25
3.	"Ты снишься мне" ("Ty snishsya mne")	Nikolay Shumakov	Alexey Mazhukov	3:42
Total length:				7:07

7" single (Bulgaria)

Side one
No.	Title	Lyrics	Music	Length
1.	"Арлекино" (live) ("Arlekino")	Boris Barkas	Emil Dimitrov; Pavel Slobodkin (reworking)	5:18
Total length:				5:18

Side two
No.	Title	Lyrics	Music	Length
1.	"Сънувам те" (live) ("Snuvam te")	Nikolay Shumakov	Alexey Mazhukov	6:00
Total length:				6:00

7" single (GDR)

Side one
No.	Title	Lyrics	Music	Length
1.	"Harlekino"	Wolfgang Brandenstein; Arndt Bause	Emil Dimitrov	4:30
Total length:				4:30

Side two
No.	Title	Lyrics	Music	Length
1.	"Auch ohne Dich werde ich leben"	Wolfgang Brandenstein; Arndt Bause	Arndt Bause	3:55
Total length:				3:55

== Bibliography ==
- Razzakov, Fyodor (2003). Алла Пугачёва: По ступеням славы [Alla Pugacheva: On the steps of glory] (in Russian). Moscow: Eksmo. ISBN 5-8153-0059-4.
- Belyakov O.A. (2009). Алла Пугачёва. Moscow: Молодая гвардия. ISBN 978-5-235-03230-9.
