= Planet of the Children =

2014 debut single by Krisia Todorova & Hassan & Ibrahim

Single by Krisia Todorova Hassan & Ibrahim
- Released: 9 October 2014
- Recorded: 11 September 2014
- Genre: Ballad
- Length: 3:00
- Songwriters: Krisia Todorova, Slavi Trifonov, Evgeni Dimitrov, Ivaylo Valchev
- Producer: Seven-Eight Production

Krisia Todorova Hassan & Ibrahim singles chronology
"Planet of the Children"	""#discover""
(Bulgaria) "Planet of the Children"
Junior Eurovision Song Contest 2014 entry
- Country: Bulgaria
- Artists: Krisia Todorova, Hasan & Ibrahim
- Languages: Bulgarian
- Composers: Slavi Trifonov, Krisia Todorova, Evgeni Dimitrov
- Lyricists: Krisia Todorova, Ivaylo Valchev
Finals performance
- Final result: 2nd
- Final points: 147
Entry chronology
-

Music video
- "Planet of the children" on YouTube

"Planet of the Children" (Bulgarian: Планетата на децата, romanized: Planetata na detsata) is the debut single by Bulgarian child singer Krisia Todorova and pianists Hasan & Ibrahim. It represented Bulgaria at the Junior Eurovision Song Contest 2014, placing second with 147 points.

The song is about a fairy willing to wake the child inside everyone because wars, fear and famine do not exist on the children's planet, but goodness only.

== Background ==
Krisia became the Bulgarian representative as Pavel Stanchev, executive director of bTV Media Group, had received a call from the national broadcaster of the country BNT.

Thanks to the invitation, we started working on this project and created a solo vocal piece, and decided to include the twins Hasan and Ibrahim. They will be playing two grand pianos, thus forming a very interesting trio.

— Ku-Ku Band member Evgeni Dimitrov for Darik Radio

== Composition ==
"Planet of the Children" is a ballad written in the key of A minor by Evgeni Dimitrov, Slavi Trifonov and Krisia. It has a duration of exactly three minutes. The vocal range of the singer expands from A_{3} to E_{5}.

== Music video ==
Premiered on 9 October 2014 on bTV (Slavi's Show), the music video is set in a spacious hall with two grand pianos (black and white) inside intended for Hasan and Ibrahim. With the purpose of improving the video, theatrical smoke was used.

Krisia appears in four different dress sets which she frequently changes. This was seen from the humorous point of view by the authors of Wiwibloggs: "The songs competing at Junior Eurovision 2014 are being revealed faster than we can count dress changes in Krisia’s official video".

== Live performances ==
Krisia first sang "Planet of the Children" live on BNT's 55th anniversary show in late October 2014.

Krisia sang the song once again on 15 November, at the 12th annual Junior Eurovision Song Contest in Malta. Despite being one of the favorites to win, "Planet of the Children" came in second with 147 points. For her performance, Todorova wore a black-and-white ballgown with a red bow.

== Critical reception ==
Most of the reviews contain positive criticism. Ghassan Al Kaziri of Oikotimes believes that "besides a well produced video, the tune is simply one of the best ever submitted to a Junior Eurovision Song Contest edition, not to mention that Krisia is giving a promising performance. If she sings like that during the live stage presentation, Bulgaria could be a dark horse for the trophy." Junioreurosong describe the song as "powerful ballad that is actually quite catchy". They consider that if Krisia sings as good as usual, that would be appreciated, as does Kaziri.
