= Ivaylo Valchev =

Bulgarian politician (born 1972)

Ivaylo Valchev MEP
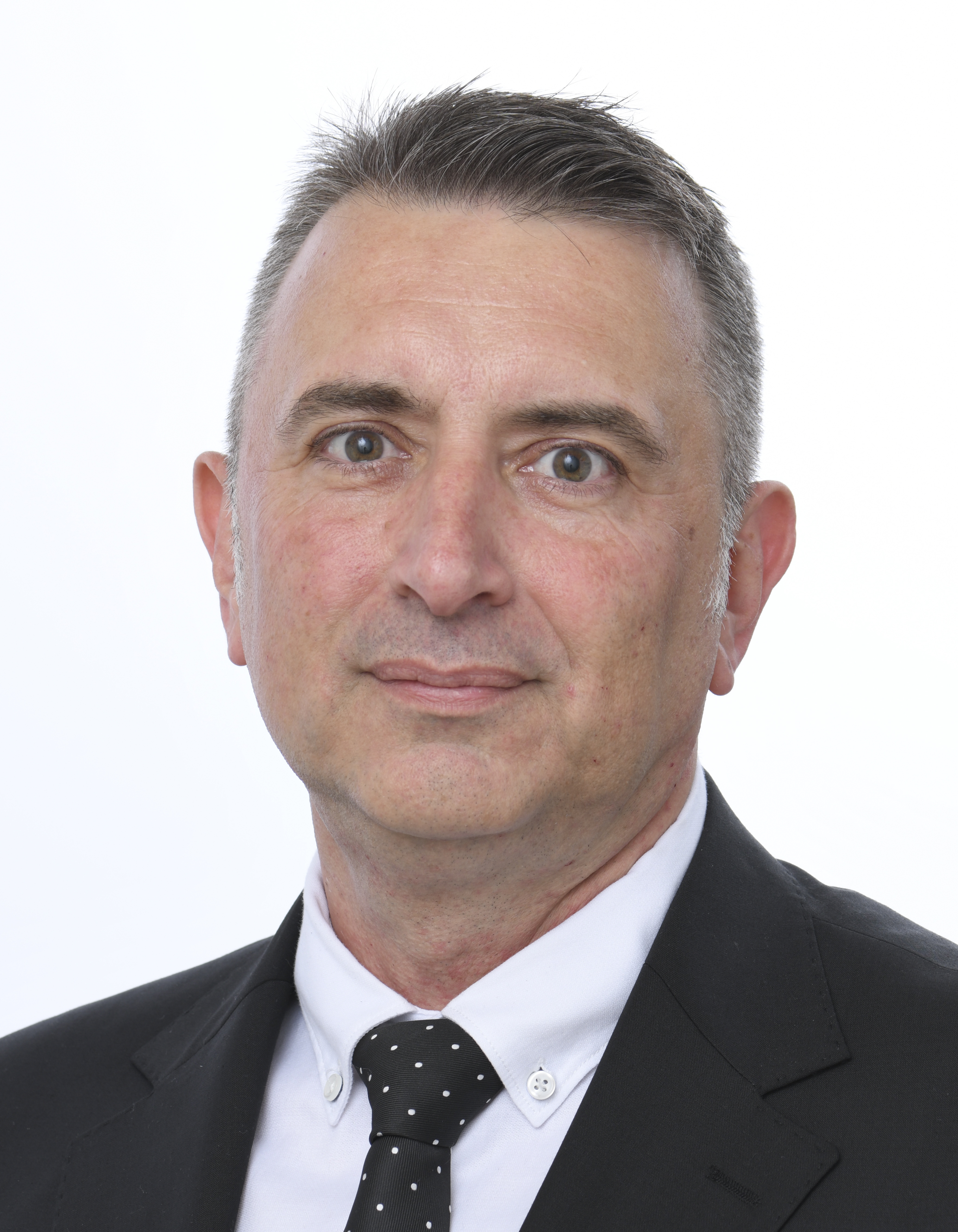

Member of the European Parliament for Bulgaria
- Incumbent
- Assumed office 16 July 2024

Member of the National Assembly
- In office 12 April 2023 – 18 June 2024
- Constituency: Burgas
- In office 15 April 2021 – 15 September 2021
- Constituency: Burgas

Personal details
- Born: 9 January 1972 (age 54) Burgas, PR Bulgaria
- Party: There is Such a People
- Other political affiliations: European Conservatives and Reformists
- Parent: Vanyo Valchev (father)

Ivaylo Vanev Valchev (Bulgarian: Ивайло Ванев Вълчев; 9 January 1972) is a Bulgarian poet, screenwriter, lyricist, and politician of There is Such a People (ITN). He was elected member of the European Parliament in 2024.

== Early life and career ==
Valchev was born in Burgas in 1972, as the son of Vanyo Valchev. He has written several songs for Ku-Ku Band, which includes ITN leader Slavi Trifonov. In 1999 he wrote PFC CSKA Sofia's anthem "Sartsa cherveni". He co-wrote "Planet of the Children", which represented Bulgaria in the Junior Eurovision Song Contest 2014, as well as "Colour of Hope", which represented Bulgaria in the Junior Eurovision Song Contest 2015.

== Political career ==
Valchev was a member of the National Assembly in 2021, in the 45th and 46th meetings of the parliament. In the 2023 Sofia mayoral election, he was the candidate of the ITN for mayor of Sofia. He was elected to the European Parliament in 2024, and in July 2024 was elected member of the European Conservatives and Reformists Group Executive.
