= Stiliyan Ivanov =

Bulgarian film director and writer (born 1968)

- Стилиян Боянов Иванов
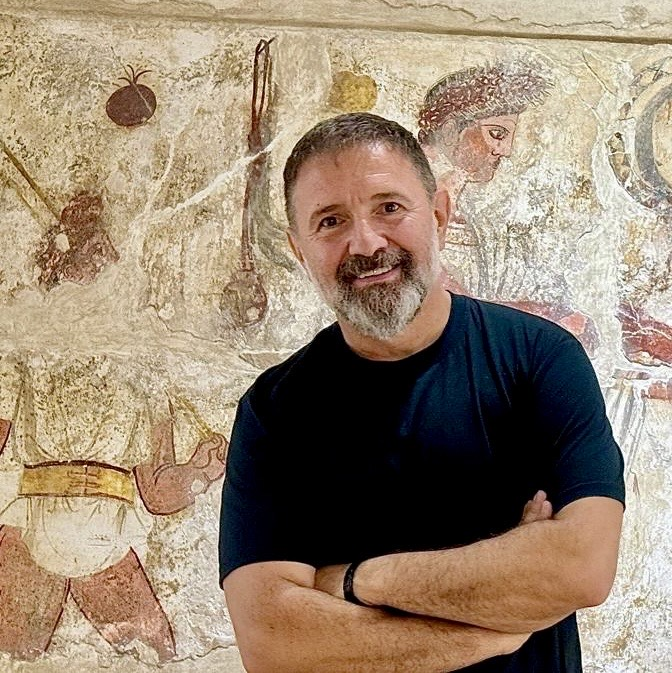
- Ivanov in October 2025
- Born: Стилиян Боянов Иванов [Stiliyan Boyanov Ivanov] 29 August 1968 (age 58); Sandanski, Bulgaria
- Education: Krastyo Sarafov National Academy for Theatre and Film Arts
- Occupations: Film director; writer; teacher
- Years active: Since - 1992
- Works: List: Vanga (1996) Documentary Movie; The truth about Orpheus (2007) Documentary Movie; "Bolshoi Theatre" (2011) Documentary Movie; Dervishes - Mystics Of The East (2012) Documentary Movie; The Centaurs (2025) Documentary Movie
- Awards: List: "Director of the Year" – 1997, video clip; "Director of the Year" – 1999, video clip; "I am a person", Orenburg - 2007; Second International Film Festival "Vernoe serdce", Moscow - 2007; 10th Anniversary Eurasian Television and Film Festival – 2007; Union of Russian Journalists – “For High Professional Achievements” – 2013; Movie Award from International Film Festival Zaječar – 2018
- Website: my.aseman.eu

Stiliyan Ivanov (Bulgarian: Стилиян Боянов Иванов; Stiliyan Boyanov Ivanov) is a Bulgarian film director, writer, and astrologer. He has directed over 63 documentaries and written eight books about history, culture, and philosophy.

He has directed films about global cultural sites and traditions around the world, including the Bolshoi Theatre in Moscow, the traditions of Shamans in Canada (A Tale about Faith), the Sufi traditions in Iran (Worshipers of the Light), the ancient world in Mesopotamia (The traces of the Sand), and the history of Anatolia, Turkey (the Anatolia trilogy).

His work has been recognized with international awards and is kept in Bulgarian national libraries as educational material.

He is a member of the Union of Bulgarian Journalists. He co-owns the production company DodoFilm, where he teaches documentary filmmaking and internet television. He has also led journalism masterclasses at the Moscow State University branch in Sevastopol and Bulgarian school in Istanbul.

In 2009, he founded TV Art, a television and web platform focused to culture, tourism and the arts.

== Education ==
He graduated with a gold medal from the National Gymnasium of Natural Sciences and Mathematics “Academician Lyubomir Chakalov” in Sofia. In 1994, he graduated from the directing department at the Krastyo Sarafov National Academy for Theatre and Film Arts in the class of Prof. Hacho Boyadzhiev.

== Career ==
Ivanov is the author of 63 documentaries, including "Vanga" 1996 (about Bulgarian prophet), “Emil Dimitrov - Love, Glory and Loneliness” 2001 (about Bulgarian pop icon), "For Dogs and for People" 2002 (research about street dogs cruelty), "The Truth about Orpheus" 2007 (research of philosophy system orphism), "The Thracians" 2008 (research about ancient culture in Balkans region in Europe), "The Dervishes, Mystics of the East" 2013 (research about Sufi tradition), the tetralogy "Confession" 2020-2024 (about Bulgarian leaders in culture), "The Centaurs" 2025 (about ancient beliefs).

Ivanov began his career at Bulgarian National Television (BNT) while still a student, making biographical documentaries on notable figures like the prophet Vanga (1996) and pop icon Lily Ivanova (1995).

In the early 2000s, he moved into private media as the managing director of Balkan Bulgarian Television (BBT). During this period, he produced several television programs, including Naked News for Msat, and documentaries, including the documentary of his academy teacher - filmmaker Hacho Boyatzhiev.

In 2011, an initiative committee released on DVD Ivanov's documentaries ("The Truth about Orpheus"), ("The Thracians"), ("Vanga"), ("Emil Dimitrov - Glory! Love! Solitude!"), ("Unfinished Story"), ("The Healer Petar Dimkov") and sent copies to all regional libraries in Bulgaria.

In 2019, a panorama of Ivanov's work was presented in Varna at the Festival & Congress Centre. This was followed by a similar showcase in Sandanski in 2024, featuring a selection of his documentaries.

A selection of world premieres of his films:

- The Hague: "The Path of Human Civilization"
- Munich: "Aseman - the heaven in Me"
- Moscow: "The Truth about Orpheus" and "The Thracians"
- Istanbul: "Orpheus and the Golden Fleece" and "Aseman Heaven within me"
- Athens: "Beyond the Pain" and "Confession with Love and Pain"
- Toronto, Montreal, Quebec city, Ottawa: "Vanga", "Emil Dimitrov", The trilogy "The Thracians", "Orpheus" and "The Music", "The Healer" (about Petar Dimkov) and "Lighthouse for Souls" (about Reverent Stoyna)

== Astrology ==
Since around 1996, Ivanov has developed and practiced a system called "Aseman", which combines philosophical study with astrological analysis. Under the method of this system, he leads seminars and training programs. Ivanov's work in this field includes creating personalized "educational cards," that use astrology for personal development. He has also provided weekly astrological forecasts for Bulgarian national newspapers.
