= My Country, My Bulgaria =

1970 patriotic song by Emil Dimitrov

"My Country, My Bulgaria" (Bulgarian: Моя страна, моя България) is a Bulgarian patriotic song by Emil Dimitrov, issued in 1970. The lyrics of the song were written by Vasil Andreev. It was chosen as "The Song of the Century" in Bulgaria and is considered as an unofficial (second) national anthem of Bulgaria.

A German cover version of 1971 was titled "Monika", which charted in Germany and the Netherlands.

== Song lyrics ==
Bulgarian lyrics	Transliterated	English translation
Колко нощи аз не спах Колко друми извървях — Да се върна. Колко песни аз изпях, Колко мъка изживях — Да се върна. В мойта хубава страна Майка, татко и жена Да прегърна. Там под родното небе Чака моето дете Да се върна. Моя страна, моя България, Моя любов, моя България, Моя тъга, моя България, При теб ме връща вечно любовта. Даже нейде по света Неизвестен да умра Ще се върна. В мойта хубава страна И тревата и пръстта Да прегърна. Нека стана стръкче цвят Нека вятъра познат Ме прегърне. Нека родните поля Да ме срещнат с песента Щом се върна. Моя страна, моя България, Моя любов, моя България, Моя тъга, моя България, При теб ме връща вечно любовта. Моя страна, моя България, Моя прекрасна страна, Ще се върна.	Kolko nošti az ne spah Kolko drumi izvǎrvjah — Da se vǎrna. Kolko pesni az izpjah, Kolko mǎka izživjah — Da se vǎrna. V mojta hubava strana Majka, tatko i žena Da pregǎrna. Tam pod rodnoto nebe Čaka moeto dete Da se vǎrna. Moja strana, moja Bǎlgarija, Moja ljubov, moja Bǎlgarija, Moja tǎga, moja Bǎlgarija, Pri teb me vrǎšta večno ljubovta. Daže nejde po sveta Neizvesten da umra Šte se vǎrna. V mojta hubava strana I trevata i prǎstta Da pregǎrna. Neka stana strǎkče cvjat Neka vjatǎra poznat Me pregǎrne. Neka rodnite polja Da me sreštnat s pesenta Štom se vǎrna. Moja strana, moja Bǎlgarija, Moja ljubov, moja Bǎlgarija, Moja tǎga, moja Bǎlgarija, Pri teb me vrǎšta večno ljubovta. Moja strana, moja Bǎlgarija, Moja prekrasna strana, Šte se vǎrna.	I did not sleep for so many nights, I walked so many roads To come back. I sang so many songs, I suffered so many torments To come back. In my beautiful country My mother, my father and my wife To embrace. There, under the sky of my home My child is waiting For my return. My country, my Bulgaria, My love, my Bulgaria, My sadness, my Bulgaria, Love always makes me come back to you. Even if elsewhere in the world I die unknown I will come back. In my beautiful country The grass and earth I will embrace. May I become a flower blade May the familiar wind Embrace me. May the fields of my home Meet me with a song As soon as I come back. My country, my Bulgaria, My love, my Bulgaria, My sadness, my Bulgaria, Love always makes me come back to you. My country, my Bulgaria, My beautiful country, I will come back.
