= Panayot Panayotov (singer) =

Bulgarian pop singer (born 1951)

Panayot Panayotov (Bulgarian: Панайот Панайотов; born 28.03.1951) is a Bulgarian pop singer whose emotive songs of the 1980s and 1990s were often featured on national TV. The major themes of his songs were romantic love and – to a lesser extent – separation, loss and nostalgia.
