= 7/8 TV =

Bulgarian cable TV channel

- Type: Private
- Country: Bulgaria
- Headquarters: Sofia, Bulgaria

Programming
- Language: Bulgarian
- Picture format: 1080i HDTV (downscaled to 16:9 576i for the SDTV feed

Ownership
- Owner: Slavi Trifonov

History
- Launched: 4 November 2019
- Replaced: TV Stara Zagora
- Closed: 2026

Links
- Website: sedemosmi.tv

7/8 TV (Bulgarian: 7/8 ТВ, Седем-осми ТВ) is a Bulgarian private cable television, owned and operated by the political party There is Such a People. It was founded in 2019 in Sofia. The television is successor of Television Stara Zagora - its network and signal, and Slavi's Show.

== History ==
On 6 May in Slavi's Show, Slavi Trifonov announced that his show will end on 31 July 2019, and after 15 September Slavi and his team will create their own television. In October 2019, on his Facebook profile, Slavi Trifonov announced when his television will start. The first television broadcast was on the 4 November. On the first day the television started from 19:00 with the following broadcasts: "Studio X" and "The show of the screenwriters". The first episode of "The later show of Slavi Trofonov" was watched by 1,456,120 viewers. The registered office is in the offices of the company Seven-Eight in the so-called. "A little NPC" (Hall 12), but the television uses the studios of Doli Media Studio in Levski G, Sofia.

== Broadcasts ==
=== Present ===
- Krum Savov Live - Talk show with host Krum Savov
- Studio X - Daily commentary and journalistic program
- Slavi Trifonov's Night Show - Late-night show
- The Scriptwriters' Show - Informational-satirical show
- Tonight with Shkumbata - Humorous show with host Dimitar Tudzharov-Shkumbata
- Ivan Kulekov's Evening - Journalistic program of Ivan Kulekov
- Ku-ku Band's Evening - Music show
- The Evening of ... - Meetings with celebrities and questions from viewers
- Evening of the Northwest - Comedy show, with specific humor from the Bulgarian region Northwest
- The Weather with Ivan Atanasov-Vankata - Meteorological forecast
- 4+ - Female show
- Let's cook with Radi - Culinary show

=== Former ===
- Na ringa - Sport show
- TV DIGEST - Daily entertainment and informational block
- Actors' Evening - Humorous show, with main actors Krasimir Radkov, Marian Bachev and Ivo Siromahov and guest actors
- Mate Kitchen - Culinary show
