= Slavi's Show =

- Presented by: Slavi Trifonov
- Starring: Ku-Ku Band
- Country of origin: Bulgaria
- No. of seasons: 19
- No. of episodes: 4176

Production
- Executive producers: Diana Mladenova (producer); Asya Todorova (producer)
- Production locations: National Palace of Culture (bTV Studio 1); 1, Bulgaria Sq. Sofia, Bulgaria
- Running time: 1 hour
- Production company: 7/8 productions

Original release
- Release: November 27, 2000 – July 31, 2019

Slavi's Show (Bulgarian: Шоуто на Слави) was a long-running Bulgarian evening talk show aired every workday on bTV from 22:30 to 23:30 EET and hosted by Slavi Trifonov. Occasionally, the show also aired live at 20:00 EET.

The program blends elements of dancing, talk show, cabaret, live music, theatre, stand-up comedy and even talent contest. It has a female dancing group, Magadans, its own music band, Ku-Ku Band and a company of actors.

Among the show's guests have been Bond, Lord of the Dance, Luciano Benetton, Lech Wałęsa, Wesley Clark, Mikhail Gorbachev, Borislav Ivanov, Viswanathan Anand, Vinnie Jones, Nick Mason, Michelle Rodriguez, Brad Meltzer, Carl Lewis, Michael Malarkey, Steven Seagal, Franz Beckenbauer, Hristo Stoichkov, Fernando Allende, Paolo Coelho, Mark Selby, Juan Pablo Montoya, Lou Bega, Irvine Welsh, Lama Ole Nydahl, Wu-Tang Clan, Željko Joksimović, Yana Marinova, Goran Bregović, Tose Proeski, Karolina Gočeva, Neda Ukraden, Ceca Raznatovic, Dragana Mirkovic, t.A.T.u., Dima Bilan, Philip Kirkorov, Ruslana, Helena Paparizou, Antique, Anna Vissi, Keti Garbi, Chrispa, Army Of Lovers, Lyubomir Neikov, Ace of Base, KariZma, Victoria Silvstedt, Azis, Melissa Smith, Tiziano Ferro, Lorenzo Lamas, David Coverdale, Jean-Claude Van Damme, Stephen Baldwin, Ray Liotta, Scorpions, Asia, Judas Priest, Devin Townsend, Michael Schenker, Ken Hensley, John Lawton, Michael Bolton, Glenn Hughes, Charles Aznavour, Supermax, Dara, all Presidents of Bulgaria, as well as famous representatives of Bulgaria's political, sports and cultural elite.

During its first years Slavi's Show was the most popular Bulgarian TV program, with every episode being watched by around 1.5 million of the country's total population of 7.3 million: a remarkable achievement extending bTV's prime time to include the late-night show as well. The show is also popular in the Republic of Macedonia, Greece and Serbia. It's also watched by many Bulgarian immigrants all over the world (United States, Germany, Spain, Australia, etc.)

The show has its own TV studio in the National Palace of Culture and a live audience of about 100-150.

== Cancellation ==
On 6 May 2019, Slavi Trifonov announced that he will cancel his new contract with bTV, therefore the last episode of the show was aired on 31 July. There, the host announced the creation of his own television named Seven-Eight (the name of the company he's part of), but did not mention whether the show will continue there or there will be a completely different show.
