= Slavi Trifonov =

Bulgarian musician and politician

- Слави Трифонов
- Born: Stanislav Todorov Trifonov; 18 October 1966 (age 59); Pleven, PR Bulgaria
- Education: National Academy of Music
- Occupations: Singer; songwriter; producer; television presenter; politician
- Years active: 1992–present
- Height: 6 ft 6 in (198 cm)
- Political party: There Is Such a People

Stanislav Todorov Trifonov (Bulgarian: Станислав Тодоров Трифонов; born 18 October 1966), known as Slavi Trifonov (Bulgarian: Слави Трифонов), is a Bulgarian TV host, tambourine and viola player, singer and politician. Trifonov is mainly active in the traditional Bulgarian folklore music genres, but he has experimented with other genres such as hip-hop in collaboration with the Australian-based producer Yasen Subev, and pop-rock and punk as a part of Ku-Ku Band (Bulgarian: Ку-Ку Бенд). His name is associated mainly with the Slavi's Show, Exiles, Canaletto and KU-KU.

== Biography ==
=== Early life ===
Stanislav Todorov Trifonov was born on 18 October 1966 in Pleven, Bulgaria. His father is from Gorna Mitropoliya, Dolna Mitropoliya Municipality, and his mother, Zdravka, is from Todorovo, Pleven Municipality. He has a sister, Petya, three years older than him, who he has said is the person closest to him. He was named after his grandfather Stoyo.

He grew up in a strict family where his mother had a major role, and the value of a good education was upheld. Trifonov was an excellent student and enjoyed spending time reading books.

Trifonov enrolled in the music school in Pleven; during one of the school holidays, he went to Kaylaka Park with his class. Although uncomfortable, and feeling out of place there, he decided to sign up for the talent night. He performed some jokes he had memorized from comedian Dimitar Shkumbata's apocryphal audiotape. Trifonov was surprised by the audience's positive response and their request for an encore, which he defines as a turning point in his life.

In 1985 Trifonov graduated from SMU Panayot Pipkov in Pleven, and later graduated from the National Academy of Music in Sofia, Bulgaria.

=== Filmography ===
Slavi Trifonov voiced Red in the Bulgarian dub of The Angry Birds Movie.

=== Television career ===
Trifonov, along with Petаr Kurumbashev and Lyuben Dilov Jr., was one of the first producers of private programming on Bulgarian National Television (BNT).

His first appearance was on the TV show KUKU in a sketch parody of a heavy metal band, shot in Studio 4 of the National Television network.

In 1997, he actively participated in protests against the rule of Zhan Videnov on Canaletto.

In 1998, he became producer and host of Exiles. The programme was suspended from BNT after its first broadcast on 8 February 1998, before being broadcast by 7 Dni TV and other cable TV channels in the country two years later. It was distinguished by sharp political satire and strong participation by the group Ku-Ku Band. The main script writers of Exiles were writers Rosen Petrov, Toshko Yordanov, Ivaylo Valchev, Ivo Petrov, and Ivo Siromahov.

On 27 November 2000 Trifonov made the first episode of Slavi's Show on bTV. He is currently the director of the production company Seven-eight AD. The company produces programming mostly for bTV and bTV Media Group such as 5 Stars and reality shows on license including Survivor BG, Music Idol 1, and Dancing Stars 2, and two mini-series Where is Brother? and Brandy and Sunrise.

As a singer he has released twenty-two albums, with Ku-Ku, Canaletto, Outcasts and Ku-Ku Band. He has gone on numerous tours throughout the country, as well as a tour in the United States and Canada. In 2004, he recorded a duet with the lead singer of Antique, Elena Paparizou, called "Why?"

In 2005, Trifonov participated in the Bulgarian national finals for the Eurovision duet with Sofi Marinova. When it was time to perform their song "Unity", Trifonov announced that they were withdrawing from the competition because the vote was manipulated using SIM cards.

In 2008, Trifonov was fined 500 leva (roughly $275 U.S.) for contempt. Trifonov has filed multiple lawsuits against so-called tabloid newspapers, won the majority of them, and donated the money to charity. In early 2013, Trifonov condemned the company Magardich Halvadjian and Judy Halvadjian for misusing excerpts from "Slavi's Show".

On 6 May in Slavi's Show, Trifonov announced that his show would end on 31 July 2019, and after 15 September Slavi and his team will create their own television channel, called 7/8 TV. In October 2019 on his Facebook profile Slavi announced when his TV channel will start broadcasting. The first television broadcast was on 4 November 2019.

Trifonov now produces 6 new shows on 7/8 TV. He is the host of the new show called Late Night Show with Slavi Trifonov.

== Ku-Ku Band ==
Trifonov is the frontman and tambourine player of the Bulgarian music band Ku-Ku established in 1993 by Trifonov, Evgeni Dimitrov, Maestro Evgeny Jotov, and Ilia Iliev. The band has played or plays a major role on the TV programmes KU-KU, Canaletto and Slavi's Show, and on other projects such as Fife Stars, Idols, Sing with Me, and The Voice of Bulgaria 1 and 2. It has released 21 albums, over 300 songs, performed at hundreds of concerts, and toured thirteen times, including once in the United States.

== Political career ==
In 2019 he set up the populist There Is Such a People (ITN) party, which has supported the 2020–2021 Bulgarian protests. The party participated in the April 2021 Bulgarian parliamentary election and ended up second, winning 17.4% of the popular vote, which amounts to 51 seats in the National Assembly. When no party was able to form a government, another parliamentary election was held in July 2021, at which ITN emerged as the strongest party, winning 23.8% of the vote and 65 parliamentary seats. Trifonov announced he would form a minority government.

== Stances on political and social issues ==
Trifonov has been supportive of the introduction of more aspects of direct democracy in the Bulgarian political system. In March 2020, he donated лв. 100,000 to go towards the salaries of the medical personnel in the Alexandrovska Hospital in Sofia who were battling the COVID-19 pandemic, but has also been criticized for initially downplaying the extent of the pandemic in the country and publicly opposing many of the pandemic control measures. In January 2021, a Trifonov statement comparing the government-imposed restrictions as a result of the emergency epidemiological situation to the Ottoman yoke attracted controversy. He has been opposed to open border policies and expressed concerns regarding the presence of refugees in Bulgaria from conflict hotspots in the Middle East.

== Discography ==
- Ръгай чушки в боба (Prod Peppers in the Bean Soup) (1993)
- Шат на патката главата (Rip off the Head of the Duck) (1994)
- Рома ТВ (Roma TV) (1994)
- Жълта книжка (Certificate for Mental Disorder) (1995)
- Хъшове (Hajduks) (1996)
- Каналето – The Best (Canaletto – The Best) (1997)
- Едно Ферари с цвят червен (A Red Coloured Ferrari) (1997)
- Франция, здравей (Hello, France) (1998)
- Девети трагичен (The Tragic Ninth) (1998)
- Вавилон (Babylon) (1998)
- Няма "не искам", няма "недей" (Don't Say "I Don't Want to", Don't Say "Don't Do It") (1999)
- Часът на бенда (The Hour of the Band) (2000)
- Новите Варвари (The New Barbarians) (2001)
- The Best (2001)
- Vox Populi (2002)
- Прима патриот (Prima Patriot) (2004)
- И оркестъра да свири (Let the Orchestra Play) (2005)
- Ние продължаваме (We Keep on Going) (2007)
- No Mercy (2009)
- Македония (Macedonia) (2010)
- Един от многото (One of the Many) (2012)
- Има такъв народ (There is Such a People) (2017)
- Песни за българи (Songs for/about Bulgarians) (2018)
