= Music of Molise =

Regions of Italy

While it is one of the smallest regions of Italy, the Music of Molise is active.

== Musical venues and activities ==
The Teatro Savoia was built and opened in 1926 in Campobasso and then reopened in 2002. Campobasso has a friends of music association and, despite the region's small area, a symphony orchestra. The city is also the home of the Lorenzo Perosi music conservatory.

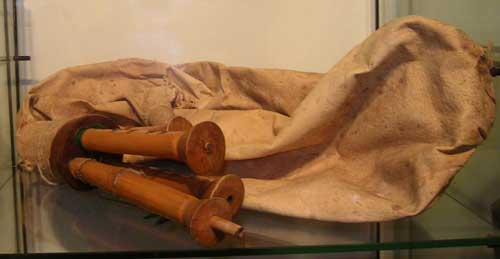
The zampogna, a folk bagpipe.

Isernia is known for its folk traditions and open-air festivals. The annual festival Mostra Mercato della Zampogna in Scapoli is held each July with exhibitions and markets for the zampogna, a folk version of bagpipes.

The Museum of the Zampogna in Scapoli has a permanent exhibit of local traditional as well as foreign instruments.
