= Calabrian tarantella =

Musical-dancing expressions originating in Calabria

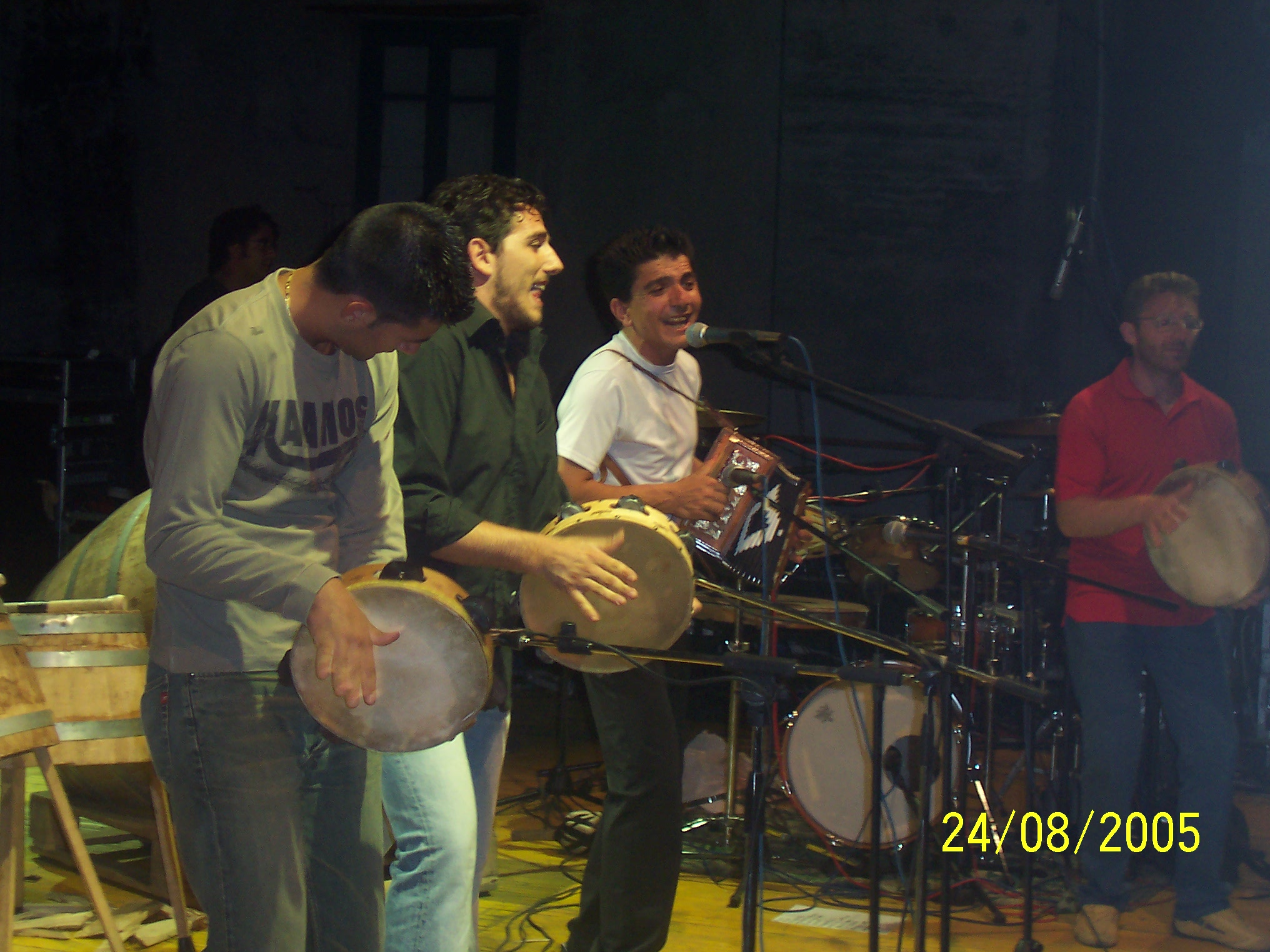
Tarantella players

Calabrian tarantella, known in Italian as tarantella calabrese, is a generic term to include different musical-dancing expressions spread in Calabrian peninsula and different from other southern Italian dances called simply tarantella. It is played and danced during religious festivals and other social occasions. In recent times the tradition has been revived as new groups are taking an interest in instruments which had been falling into obscurity; they played "ad usu anticu" (in the old/traditional way) or they modernised the sound adding a bassline or new sounds.

== Musical instruments ==
Calabrian tarantella at Caulonia (August 2010)

Musical instruments of Calabrian Tarantella are zampogna, substituted often by organetto, with tamburello; in some areas was used zampogna with pipita, and fischiotta, while in Locride and Monte Poro was used Calabrian lira. Rhythm is based on terzine with time in 12/8 and sometimes in 6/8.

Although there is homogeneity in tarantella played and danced in all Calabria, there are some geographical differences: there is libera in east catanzarese, sonu a ballu in Aspromonte, and zumparieddu in Sila and Viddanedda in Reggio Calabria and style differences: fimminina (female style), masculina (male style), libera.

== Dance ==
Calabrian tarantella is a man-women couple dance, but it could be also man-man and woman-woman, in a circular space made of moving people named rota ('wheel'). U mastru i ballu ('Master of dance') decide the order of the dancers inside rota managed turns. Players outside rota follow and feel dancers and change music rhythm. In the past, during dancing, the people created a unique rota in the square where they danced.

== Main Calabrian tarantella festivals ==
- Paleariza at Bova (RC), since 1997
- Kaulonia Tarantella Festival at Caulonia (RC), since 2008
- Tarantella Power at Caulonia, since 1998 to 2007 and since 2009 to Badolato (RC)
- Radici Sonore at Tiriolo (CZ), since 2006
- Radicazioni Festival at Alessandria del Carretto (CS), since 2003
- Tamburello Festival at Zambrone (VV), since 2004
- Sùanu 'e canna at Sant'Andrea Apostolo dello Ionio, since 2010
- Satrianella Festival at Satriano (CZ), since 2009

== See also ==
- Music of Calabria
