= Music of Sicily =

Traditional music from Sicily, Italy

The music of Sicily is created by peoples from the isle of Sicily. It was shaped by the island's history, from the island's great presence as part of Magna Graecia 2,500 years ago, through various historical incarnations as a part of the Roman Empire, then as an independent state as the Emirate of Sicily then as an integral part of the Kingdom of Sicily and later the Kingdom of the Two Sicilies, and, finally, as an autonomous region of the modern nation state of Italy.

== General comments ==
Sicily is home to a great variety of religious music, including a cappella devotional songs from Montedoro and many brass bands like Banda Ionica, who play songs from a diverse repertoire. Harvest songs and work songs are also indigenous to the agricultural island, known as "Italy's granary". Sicilian flute music, called friscaletto, is also popular among traditionalist Sicilians, as are Messina's male choirs and the island's "ciarameddi" (bagpipes).

Franco Battiato, Carmen Consoli, Fratelli Mancuso and Ciccio Busacca are among the most popular musicians from Sicily. Busacca has worked with Dario Fo, like many Italian musicians, but is perhaps best known for his setting the poems of Ignazio Buttitta, a poet who wrote in Sicilian. Fratelli Mancuso (with brothers Enzo and Lorenzo Mancuso) have fused traditional Sicilian peasant songs (lamentazioni), monodic chants (alla carrettiera) and other indigenous forms to create a uniquely Sicilian modern song style.

Sicily has the most vibrant jazz scene in Italy, based in Palermo and including Enzo Rao and his group Shamal, who have added native Sicilian and Arab influences to American jazz. Sicily is also home to Franco Battiato, a popular musician and composer who fused rock and roll with traditional and classical influences, beginning with 1979's L'era del cinghiale bianco, a popular landmark album. Pop-classical crossover soundtrack queen Romina Arena hails from Sicily. She has not only recorded in her Sicilian/Italian languages but recorded and released recordings in many other languages including English, Japanese, Spanish and French worldwide.

The vast migration of Sicilians to New Orleans in the United States between the late 1800s and early 1900s is also credited for aiding the creation of jazz as well. During this migration, Sicilian music integrated with music from the local African American and Creole communities, which resulted in the development of jazz. Two members of the Original Dixieland Jass Band, bandleader Nick LaRocca and drummer Tony Sbarbaro, were each born to parents who had migrated from Sicily.

== Traditional music ==
Sicily's historical connections lie not primarily with mainland Italy, but with the Greek and Byzantine Hymns, Arabic Maqam, and Spanish music styles. The result has been a diverse and unique fusion of musical elements on the island. American musicologist Alan Lomax made some historic recordings of Sicilian traditional music in the 20th century, including lullabies, dance music, festival music, epic storytelling and religious music. The Siciliana, a slow and lilting Italian style of music in triple meter, is loosely but not definitively associated with Sicily since the 1600s.

Sicily is home to several different types of folk music instruments, many of which can also be found in other parts of Southern Italy. The Sicilian ciaramedda is a type of Italian Zampogna (Bagpipe) that has two equal length chanters and from two to three drones. All the pipes use single cane reeds made from Arundo donax. Also made out of Arundo donax is a small end-blown flute called a friscaletto or friscalettu. The jaw harp, known in Sicilian as "marranzanu" is heavily associated with Sicilian folk music. Since its invention in the early 19th century, the Organetto, a diatonic folk accordion, also has been prevalent in traditional Sicilian music. Percussion instruments include tambourines and other frame drums as well as the "cupa cupa", a unique-sounding friction drum.

== Musical and theatrical venues ==
Sicily has 9 provinces. They are Palermo, Agrigento, Caltanissetta, Catania, Enna, Messina, Ragusa, Siracusa, and Trapani, (each named for the largest city and capital of the province). By province they offer these venues and activities:

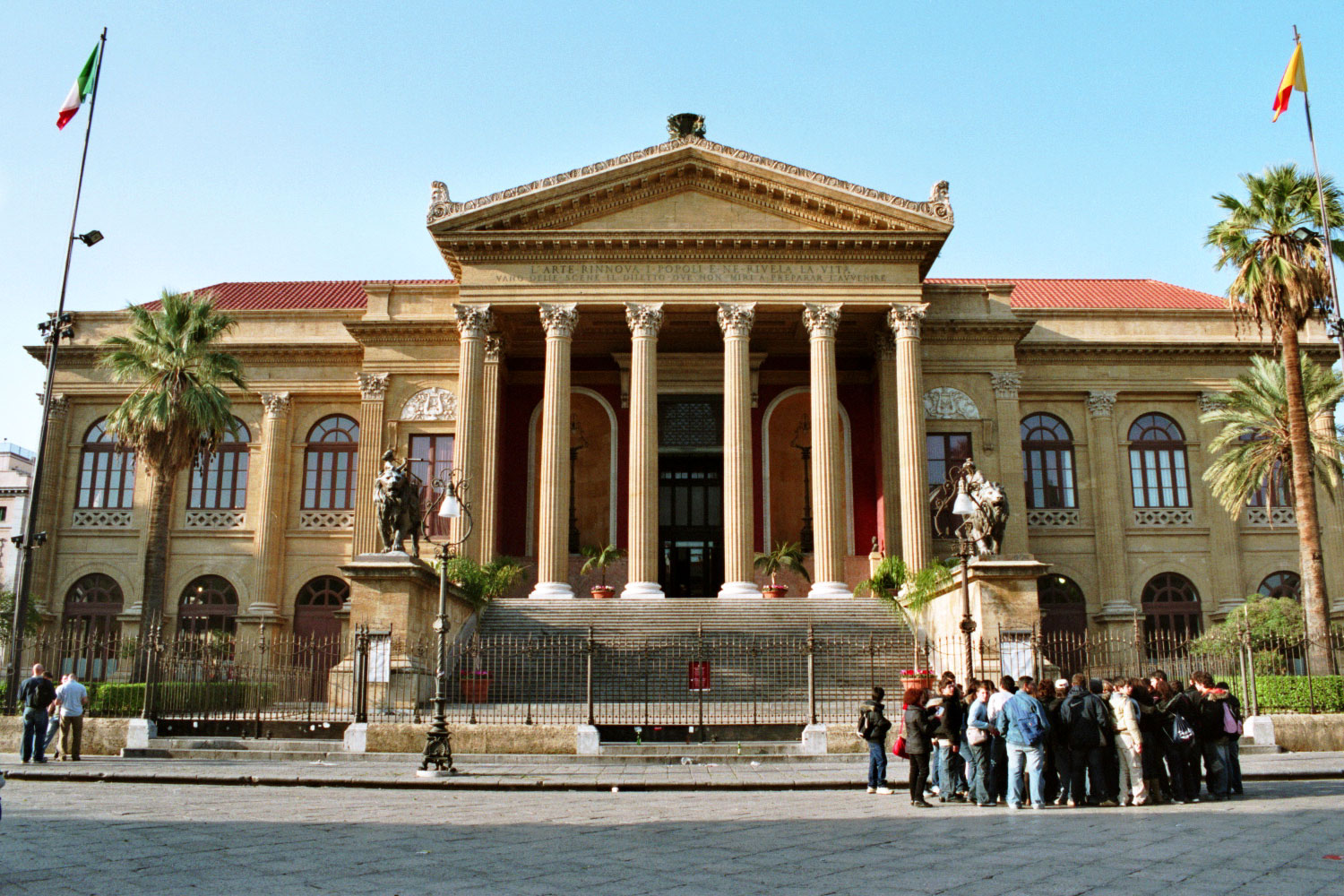
Teatro Massimo

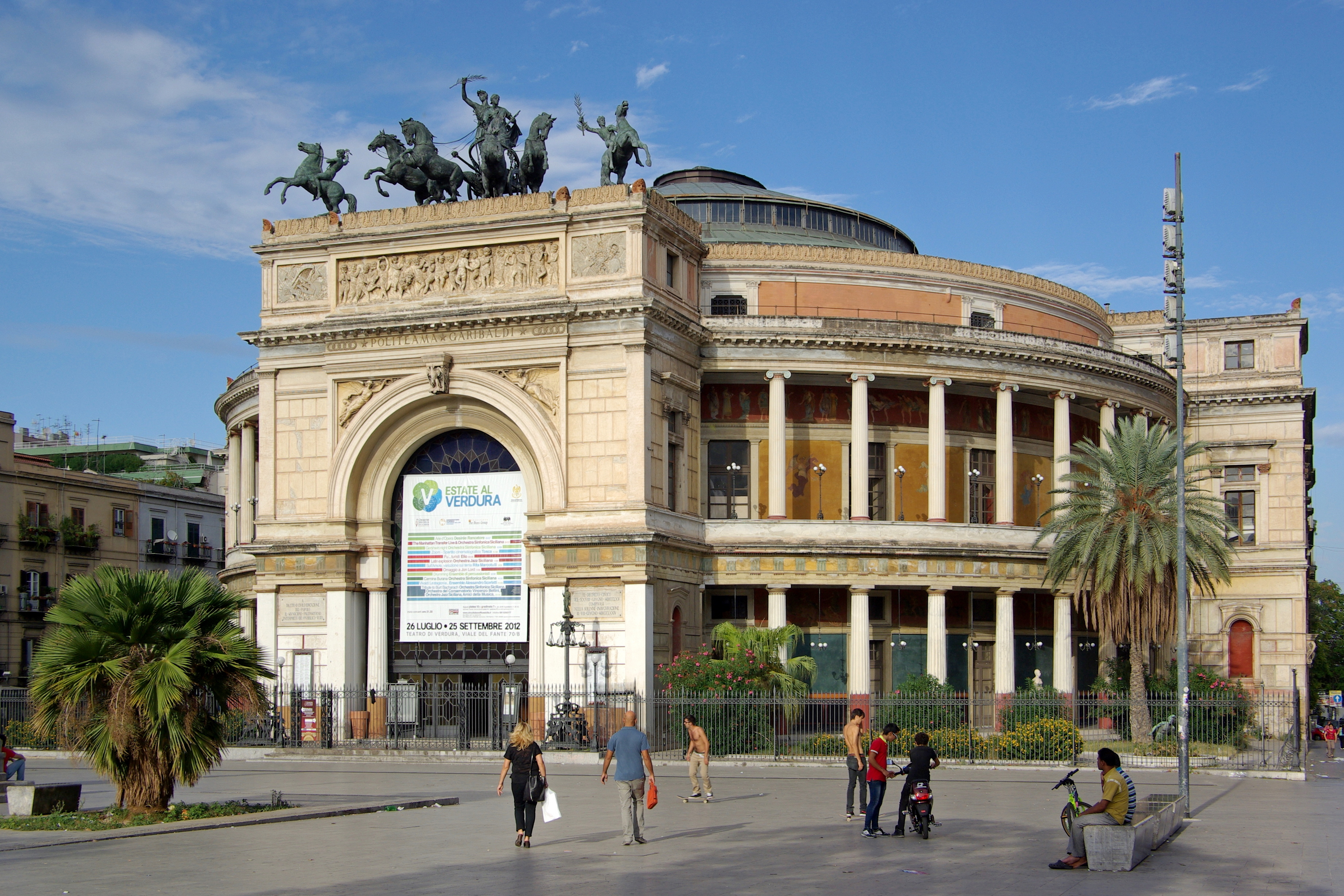
Teatro Politeama

- Palermo: the theatrical tradition in Palermo goes back the 16th century and the visit of Charles V. Currently, there are about a dozen theaters in the city of Palermo that feature live music. Among these are the Teatro Massimo, the Teatro di Verdura a Villa Castelnuovo (an ex-Bourbon hunting lodge for the royal family of Naples on the frequent trips to Sicily), the Teatro Politeama Garibaldi, the Teatro Biondo (specializing in modern and contemporary music), the Teatro Santa Cecilia, the auditorium of the Alessandro Scarlatti Music Conservatory (formerly the Vincenzo Bellini Music Conservatory), and the Salone dello Steri (seat of the Inquisition in the 17th and 18th centuries and currently home to the Antonio Il Verso Association for Ancient Music). The town of Monreal in the province hosts a Sacred Music Week on the premises of the cathedral;
- Agrigento: the site of an important folk festival, the Sagro del Mandorlo in Fiore. The city also has the Teatro Luigi Pirandello and an archaeological museum that hosts concerts amidst ancient ruins.
- Caltanissetta: the recently reopened Teatro Regina Margherita sponsors the concerts of the Friends of Music Association as well as the "finals" of the Vincenzo Bellini music competition.

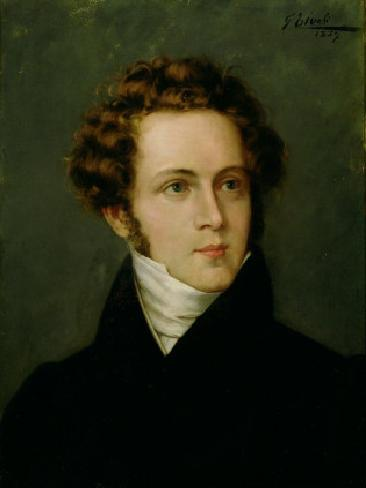
Vincenzo Bellini

- Catania: the city is the site of the splendid Teatro Massimo Bellini, built in 1890 and still decorated with the original architectural allegories to the works of this "favorite son" composer.
- Enna: the cathedral of Enna (from the early 14th century) is the occasional site of music performances; so it is the medieval castle (13th century), one of the biggest fortresses in Sicily, which has hosted for decades the so-called "Closest theater to stars", name due to the altitude of the castle and town of Enna (more than 950 m on the sea level).

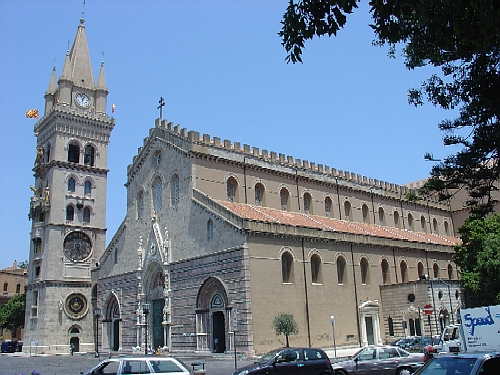
Cathedral of Messina (2004)

- Messina: the Teatro Vittorio Emanuele in Messina hosts concerts sponsored by the Laudamo Philharmonic Association. The Cathedral of Messina was heavily damaged both in the 1908 Messina earthquake and by the bombings of WW2; it has been restored to its original Norman style and is the frequent site of classical music concerts. Messina is the site of the Arcangelo Corelli music conservatory.

Moreover, in Taormina there is one of the most charming music venues of Italy, the well-preserved Greek theatre which regularly hosts a season of concerts every summer.

- Ragusa: the cathedral of San Giovanni Battista hosts classical music concerts; in the town of Modica, there is a library and center for popular arts and traditions, including music.
- Siracusa: the greatest of all sites of ancient Magna Graecia. The city of Siracusa has the San Pietro al Carmine auditorium as well as a large ancient Roman amphitheater (within an even earlier Greek setting) that hosts concerts.

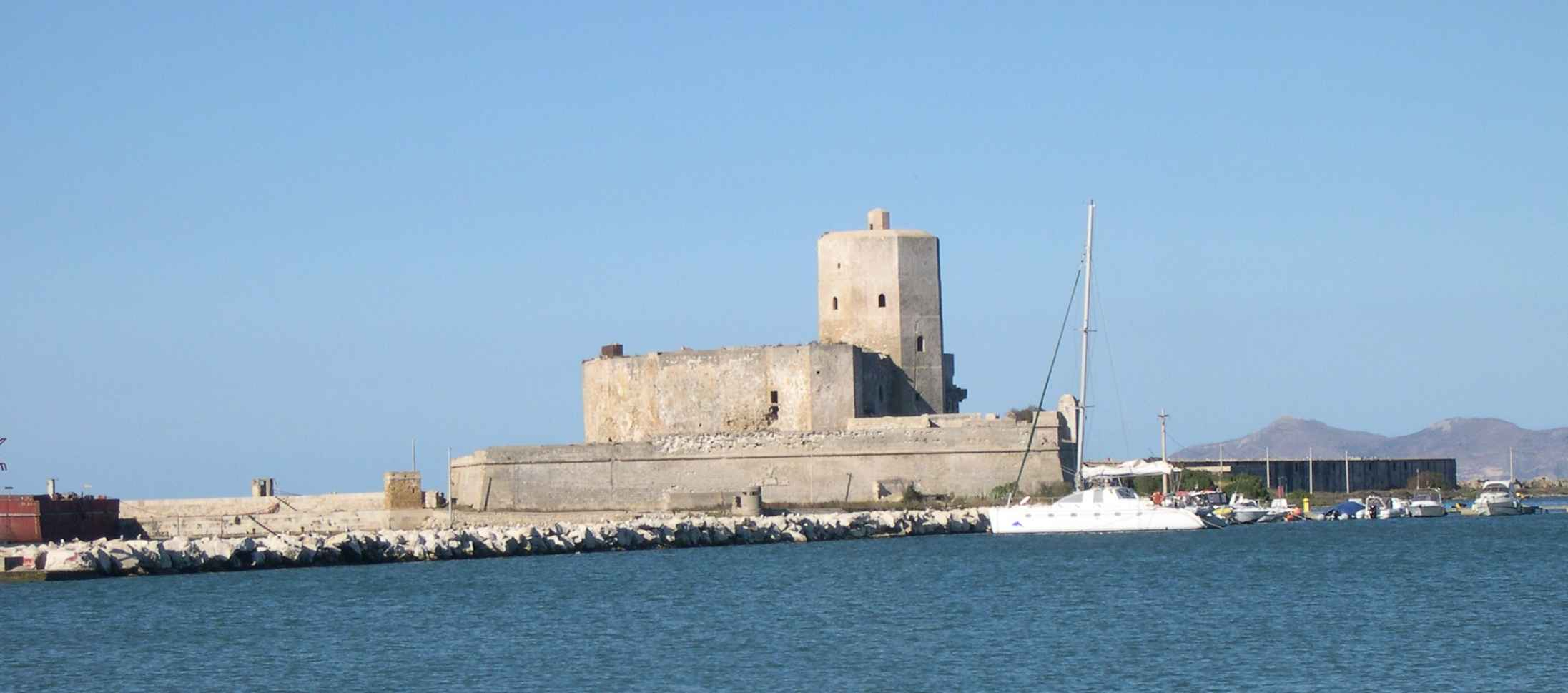
Torre della Colombaia in Trapani.

- Trapani: spread around various sites in the region are the July Music Festival and the International Opera and Youth Festival (both in the city of Trapani), the International Week of Medieval and Renaissance Music (in Erice), the International Opera Festival (in Alcamo), and the International Piano Competition and the Mario del Monaco Opera Competition (in Marsala). The Friends of Music in Trapani sponsors a very active concert season (see "external link," below).

== See also ==
- Palermo Conservatory
