= Busacca =

Busacca is a surname. Notable people with the surname include:

- Ciccio Busacca (1925–1989), Italian ballad singer
- Helle Busacca (1915–1996), Italian poet, painter, and writer
- Massimo Busacca (born 1969), Swiss football referee
