= Rosa Balistreri =

Sicilian composer (1927–1990)

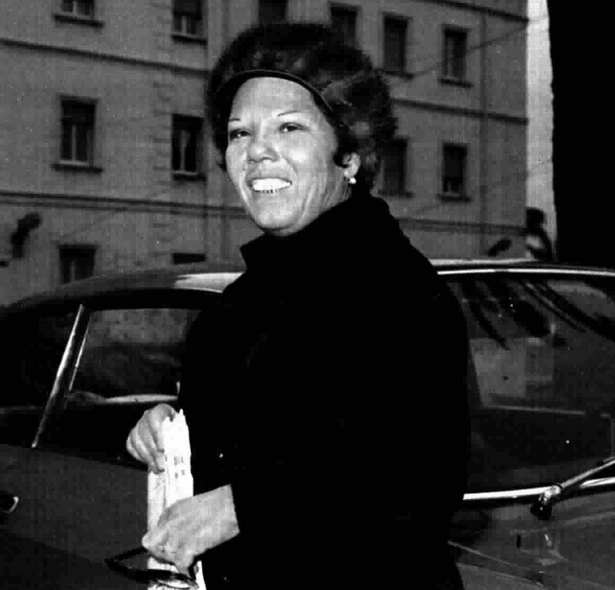
- Balistreri in Sanremo (1973)
- Born: 21 March 1927; Licata, Agrigento, Sicily, Italy
- Died: 20 September 1990 (aged 63); Palermo, Sicily, Italy
- Occupations: singer guitarist songwriter
- Years active: 1966–1990

Rosa Balistreri (21 March 1927 – 20 September 1990) was a sicilian singer and musician. Her hoarse voice charged with melancholy and strong personality made her a Sicilian icon of the twentieth century, much like the writer Leonardo Sciascia, the poet Ignazio Buttitta and the painter Renato Guttuso, who counted all three among her admirers. She is known for singing in her native Sicilian language.

== Biography ==
Rosa Balistreri was born in Licata, a town in the province of Agrigento, in western Sicily, in the late 1920s. Her father was an alcoholic carpenter, and Rosa was forced to do menial jobs instead of going to school. In 1951, after experiencing the Sicily of Leonardo Sciascia's Candido, Rosa left her village at the age of 24 for Tuscany, settling in Florence, where she worked as a domestic servant. Uprooted from her native land, she started her artistic career at 39, through Dario Fo who made her star in one of his shows, Ci ragiono e canto. Rosa recorded her first two albums the following year, in 1967, and performed at Teatro Carignano in Turin, at Teatro Manzoni in Milan and at Teatro Metastasio in Prato. In 1971, now-renowned Rosa Balistreri returned after twenty years in Sicily, where she would sing until her death. Often composed in dramatic style, her songs depict Sicily, as her friend Leonardo Sciascia describes, as "violent, tender, bitter, sweet, full of ambiguities". The "Soprano of the South", as Ignazio Buttitta nicknamed her, related the misfortunes but also the beauties and mysteries of the three-pointed island. She also embodied, as her friends Amalia Rodrigues, Renato Guttuso and Leonardo Sciascia, a generation of artists joining the communist ideology.

Rosa Balistreri died in Palermo in 1990 at the age of 63, but her work survives and is modernized through the interpretations of Serena Rispoli, Carmen Consoli, and especially Etta Scollo who, accompanied by the Sicilian Symphony Orchestra, performs her most iconic songs, such as "'U cunigghiu", "I pirati a Palermu" or "Cu ti lu dissi".

== Discography ==
Sources:

- La voce della Sicilia (1967, Tauro Record)
- Un matrimonio infelice (1967, Tauro Record)
- La cantatrice del Sud (1973, RCA reissue of La voce della Sicilia)
- Amore tu lo sai la vita è amara (1971, Cetra Folk)
- Terra che non-senti (1973, Cetra Folk)
- Noi siamo nell'inferno carcerati (1974, Cetra Folk)
- Amuri senza amuri (1974, Cetra Folk)
- La Ballata del Prefetto Mori (1977, Il prefetto di ferro)
- Vinni a cantari all'ariu scuvertu (1978, Cetra Folk)
- Concerto di Natale (1985, PDR)

=== Posthumous discography ===
- Rosa Balistreri (1996, Teatro del Sole, CD reissue of La voce della Sicilia)
- Un matrimonio infelice (1997, Teatro del Sole, CD reissue)
- Amore tu lo sai la vita è amara (2000, Teatro del Sole, CD reissue)
- Terra che non-senti (2000, Teatro del Sole, CD reissue)
- Noi siamo nell'inferno carcerati (2000, Teatro del Sole, CD reissue)
- Vinni a cantari all'ariu scuvertu (2000, Teatro del Sole, CD reissue)
- Rari e Inediti (1997, Teatro del Sole)
- Collection… la raggia, lu duluru, la passione (2004, Lucky Planets), CD 1 et 2
- Rosa canta e cunta. Rari e inediti (2007, Teatro del Sole, Graham & Associati)
- Amuri senza amuri (2007, Lucky Planets, CD reissue)

== Awards and Recognitions ==
- Premio ufficiale della critica discografica
- Premio Tenco per operatore culturale (1982)

== See also ==
- Ignazio Buttitta
- Fausto Cannone
- Folclore
