= Golden Orpheus =

Former Bulgarian song contest

- Genre: Various
- Locations: Sunny Beach, Bulgaria
- Years active: 1965–1999
- Organizer: Bulgarian National Television

Golden Orpheus (Bulgarian: Златният Орфей, Zlatniyat Orfey) was an international vocal competition and song contest, held annually from 1965 to 1999 in Sunny Beach, Bulgaria.

The festival program included a Bulgarian song competition, an international vocal competition and concerts outside the festival's competitive program. The event quickly grew into one of the most prestigious festivals in Eastern Europe during socialism. Among the winners of the vocal competition are Alla Pugacheva, Etta Scollo and Tamara Gverdtsiteli. Over the years, the festival has featured international pop stars such as Tina Turner, Wilkins and Julio Iglesias as guests. The event has been broadcast by the International Radio and Television Organisation on the Intervision network since 1967 with a viewership of nearly 200 million viewers.

Since the 2010s, instead of the Golden Orpheus, the Discovery pop music festival has been organized in Varna, where performers from around the world perform, including In-Grid and Il Volo.

== Selected winners of the Grand Prix ==
- 1966: Yordanka Hristova (Bulgaria)
- 1971: Maria Pakhomenko (USSR)
- 1972: Zdzisława Sośnicka (Poland)
- 1974: Lili Ivanova (Bulgaria)
- 1975: Alla Pugachova (USSR)
- 1976: Farah Maria (Cuba)
- 1977: Roza Rymbayeva (USSR)
- 1981: Dagmar Frederic (GDR)
- 1984: Debbie Campbell (USA)
- 1988: Tamara Gverdtsiteli (USSR)
- 1990: Etta Scollo (Italy)
- 1992: Henry Winter (Ireland)

== Selected first prize winners ==
- 1968: Marion Rung (Finland)
- 1970: Biser Kirov (Bulgaria)
- 1971: Omara Portuondo (Cuba) and Ben Cramer (The Netherlands), (shared)
- 1973: Sofia Rotaru (USSR)
- 1974: Sergei Zakharov (USSR)
- 1974: Nereyda Naranjo (Cuba)
- 1975: Lee Towers (Netherlands)
- 1976: Enzo Gusman (Malta)
- 1979: Albert Asadullin (USSR)
- 1980: Valery Leontiev (USSR)
- 1981: Argelia Fragoso (Cuba)
- 1986: Albita Rodriguez (Cuba)
- 1988: Marusha (Cuba)
- 1992: Henry Winter (Ireland)

== Selected second prize winners ==
- 1969: Yuri Bogatikov (USSR)
- 1975: Elizabeth de Gracia (Cuba)
- 1976: Eugene Martynov (USSR)
- 1992: Philipp Kirkorov (Russia)

== Selected third prize winners ==
- 1968: Joseph Kobzon (USSR)
- 1972: Lev Leshchenko (USSR)
- 1982: Miguel Chávez (Cuba)
- 1984: María de Jesus (Cuba)

== Notable interval act performers ==
- Ornella Vanoni – 1969
- Josephine Baker – 1970
- Gilbert Bécaud – 1971
- Salvatore Adamo - 1972
- Rosita Fornés – 1972
- Gianni Morandi – 1973
- Ricchi e Poveri – 1973
- Julio Iglesias – 1973
- Karel Gott – 1974, 1986
- Al Bano and Romina Power – 1975, 1984
- Iva Zanicchi - 1976
- Alla Pugacheva – 1976, 1982, 1986, 1995
- Irakere – 1976
- Eruption – 1979
- Farah Maria – 1981
- Tina Turner – 1982
- Mungo Jerry – 1987
- Paco de Lucía – 1988
- Boney M. – 1990
- Johnny Logan – 1990
- Toto Cutugno – 1993
- Boy George – 1994
- La Toya Jackson – 1994
- Demis Roussos - 1995
- The Temptations – 1995
- Paul Rodgers – 1995
- Alannah Myles – 1996
- 2 Unlimited – 1996
- Philipp Kirkorov – 1998
