= Giuseppe Musolino =

Italian brigand

- Giuseppe Musolino
- Born: September 24, 1876; Santo Stefano in Aspromonte, Reggio Calabria, Italy
- Died: January 22, 1956 (aged 79); Reggio Calabria, Italy
- Resting place: Santo Stefano in Aspromonte
- Known for: Prison escape, murder spree, murder trial
- Penalty: 22 years of hard labor (1898); Life imprisonment including 8 years of solitary confinement (1902)
- Escaped: 19 January 1899
- Escape end: 22 October 1901

Giuseppe Musolino (September 24, 1876 – January 22, 1956), also known as the "Brigante Musolino" or the "King of Aspromonte," was an Italian brigand and folk hero. Musolino received great notoriety and admiration in Calabria for escaping prison and committing a string of murders in retaliation for what he considered to be false testimony delivered against him while on trial; his later, second, trial after his recapture was subject to extensive international media coverage and attention.

== Early life ==
Musolino was born on September 24, 1876, in Santo Stefano in Aspromonte, a rugged area in the Calabria region of southern Italy.

Musolino worked as a woodcutter, like his father, spending all of his early life in the mountains of Calabria. He grew up a peasant, and had at least four close relatives who'd previously been convicted of crimes.

== Initial crimes and first trial ==
On October 27, 1897, Musolino was at his father's tavern when he engaged in a massive brawl with brothers and picciotteria members Vincenzo and Stefano Zoccali; it has been speculated that this fight was over a hazelnut delivery gone awry, with matters being complicated by Musolino's tumultuous prior relationship with the Zoccalis' sister, Virginia. Vincenzo stabbed Musolino in the limbs 40 times during the fight. While Musolino lay gravely ill from his injuries, Zoccali was shot in an ambush. Despite his condition, Musolino was accused of the crime and forcibly taken from his sickbed to prison.

On September 28, 1898, at a trial before the Corte d'Assise of Reggio Calabria, Musolino was sentenced to 22 years of hard labor for attempted murder; experts noted that his conviction was largely based on circumstantial evidence. Many witnesses were said to have lied during their testimonies, and Musolino's lawyers had been barred from calling several witnesses to the stand on his behalf. This caused some to believe that Musolino was being treated unfairly. He maintained his innocence across the duration of this trial, claiming as an alibi that he'd been in bed recovering from the stabbing.

After his sentencing, Musolino was imprisoned in Gerace, a town in Calabria.

== Escape from prison and arrest ==
Seeking to exact revenge on those who had testified against him (most of whom he felt had done so in bad faith) Musolino escaped from his prison in Gerace on January 19, 1899. For several years, Musolino was housed by peasants in the Calabrian mountains; sympathizing with him and his cause, the peasants provided him food, water, guns, and information on the locations of witnesses from the trial. He went on a killing spree throughout the countryside, being accused of murdering anywhere between seven and twenty-five individuals, almost all of whom had testified against him during his trial. Musolino believed at the time that his patron saint, Saint Joseph, was guiding and protecting him while on the run.

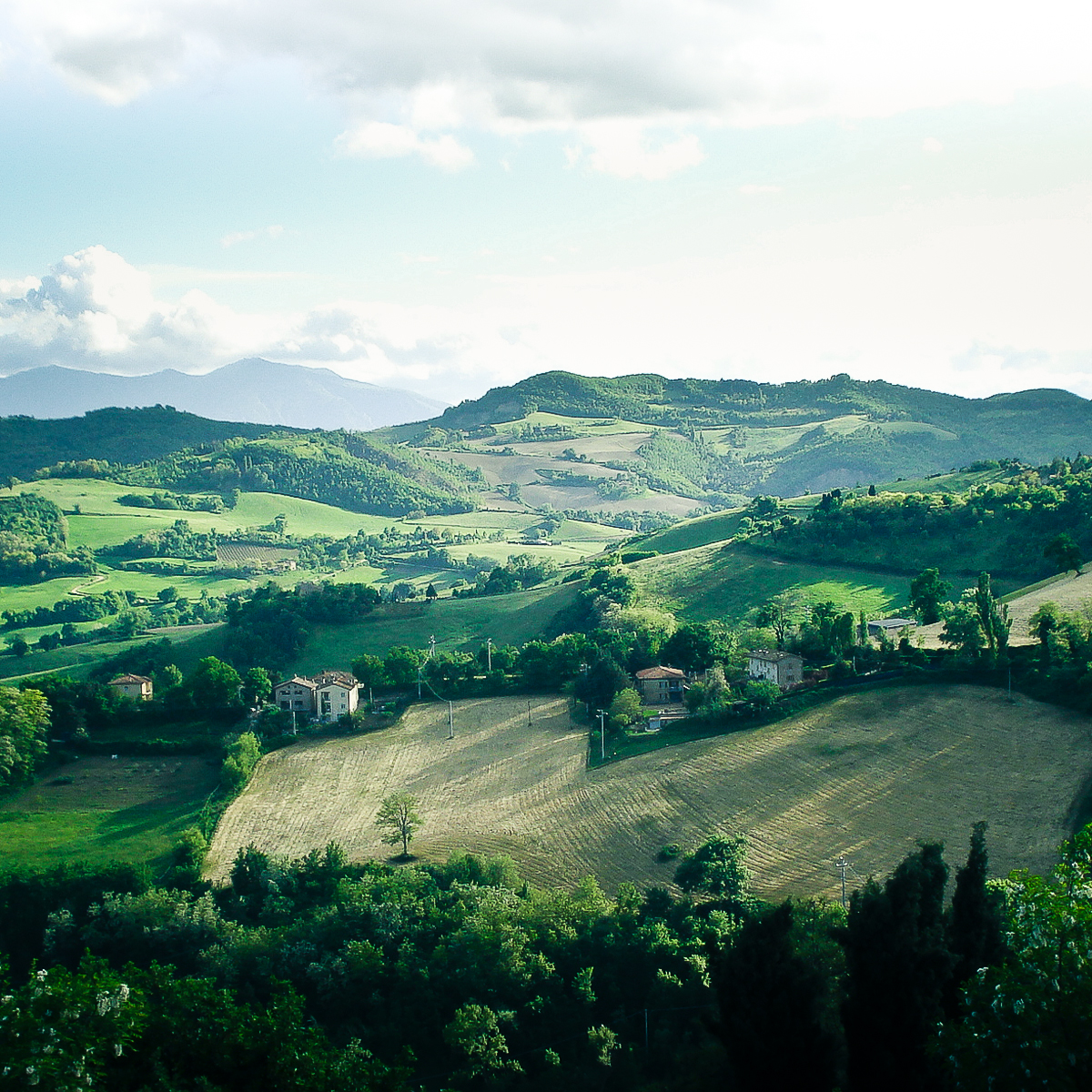
Urbino, near where Musolino was captured in 1901

As news spread of his story, escape, and string of murders, Musolino was hailed as a hero by Calabrians and others in southern Italy. He garnered significant support and sympathy from the citizens of a region where seeking revenge, often in a violent manner, was typically seen as the best way to bring about social justice, given that they felt Musolino had been wronged. In fact, he was supported by many local musicians and newspapers, and even was backed by several members of the picciotteria – the early form of the mafia-type organization later known as the 'Ndrangheta –, to which the Zoccali brothers belonged. He also was overwhelmingly supported by the poor, with many giving him information to assist in evading the authorities.

According to historian John Dickie, Musolino himself was very likely a member of the picciotteria, based on the detailed reports of journalist Adolfo Rossi, who traveled to Calabria amid the political uproar over the authorities’ failure to apprehend the fugitive. Rossi interviewed prison guards, police officers, magistrates, and visited Musolino’s home village of Santo Stefano, where he spoke with the fugitive's family and local residents. Almost everyone Rossi encountered was convinced that Musolino had taken the oath of the picciotteria. The day after Musolino's initial knife fight with Vincenzo Zoccali, the Carabinieri in Santo Stefano reported that he belonged to the "so-called mafia." His prolonged ability to evade capture, Dickie suggests, was due to the protection and support of the picciotteria network. Moreover, some of Musolino’s actions – including his original conflict with Zoccali – appear to have been rooted less in personal vengeance than in the internal politics of the picciotteria.

In early 1901, police officer Vincenzo Mangione was dispatched to Santo Stefano to implement a more effective strategy than the futile efforts of chasing Musolino through the mountains and bribing informants for leads. Mangione produced a series of reports describing the picciotteria in Musolino’s home village as a "genuine criminal institution." The organization had been founded in the early 1890s by Musolino's father and uncle, both of whom served on its "supreme council." In total, 166 individuals in Santo Stefano were identified as picciotteria affiliates. The attack on Zoccali had been ordered by the organization as punishment for his failure to fulfill his duties as a picciotto. Based on this intelligence, authorities adopted a two-pronged strategy to capture Musolino: first, by dismantling his support network; second, by prosecuting the entire picciotteria in Santo Stefano. This led to a wave of arrests in the spring and summer of 1901. With many of his allies behind bars, Musolino found it increasingly difficult to secure refuge in his home territory.

Meanwhile, Musolino began travelling to Rome at the public's behest to seek pardon from Victor Emmanuel III of Italy. However, on October 9, 1901, Musolino was captured in Acqualagna, near Urbino. Musolino was found in a vineyard by the two members of the Carabinieri, who had been sent along with one thousand soldiers by the government to search for him. His foot had been caught in a rabbit trap. He attempted to lie about who he was and was not immediately identified. During interrogation sessions over the following days, Musolino continued to lie about his identity, insisting that his name was Francesco Colafiore and providing a fictionalised life story. Police suspected that the man was truly Giuseppe Musolino, not Colafiore; on October 16, in an effort to confirm his identity, the police brought in a Calabrian man with whom Musolino had feuded in years past. Having been recognised by the man immediately, Musolino admitted his true identity.

== Second trial and imprisonment ==
=== Second trial ===
==== Charges and behavior ====
After his arrest and subsequent identification, Musolino was charged with twenty-three total criminal counts; he was charged with seven counts of murder and six counts of attempted murder, along with several charges of theft. Notably, many deemed these charges insufficient, believing that he had killed or at least attempted to kill many more individuals than the court had charged him with. Prior to the trial, Musolino was held for several months in a prison in Catanzaro, a city in Calabria. However, due to the overwhelming public support for Musolino and his cause in southern Italy, the courts were forced to move him and hold a trial in Lucca, Tuscany; this was determined to be the only way to ensure an impartial jury.

During the two-month-long trial, which took place in 1902, some observers described him as exhibiting erratic behavior and possessing an especially contemptuous attitude toward the legal system. Examples cited included his refusal to participate in the trial as long as he was being forced to wear standard convict (which he already was, as a prison escapee) attire; instead, he demanded the right to dress formally. Additionally, he interrupted witnesses and the judge on several occasions as they were speaking, often to applause as well as tears from Calabrians present at the trial who were moved by Musolino's story. Musolino also did not directly answer any questions asked of him when they were posed during the trial; instead, he would respond by retelling very long stories of his crimes and early life that were perceived by observers to have been out-of-context, again eliciting a great emotional response. Furthermore, he attempted to strangle a female witness after she provided testimony against him.

==== Musolino's defense ====
Musolino's defense team, using his conduct during this second trial as evidence, attempted to convince the court that he was unfit to stand trial and was mentally impaired while committing his crimes. A number of criminologists and psychiatrists were called upon to examine Musolino and determine if he was of sound enough mind; besides his peculiar behavior, it was noted that he had a family history of epilepsy and alcoholism, and numerous relatives were deemed by doctors to be apoplectic.

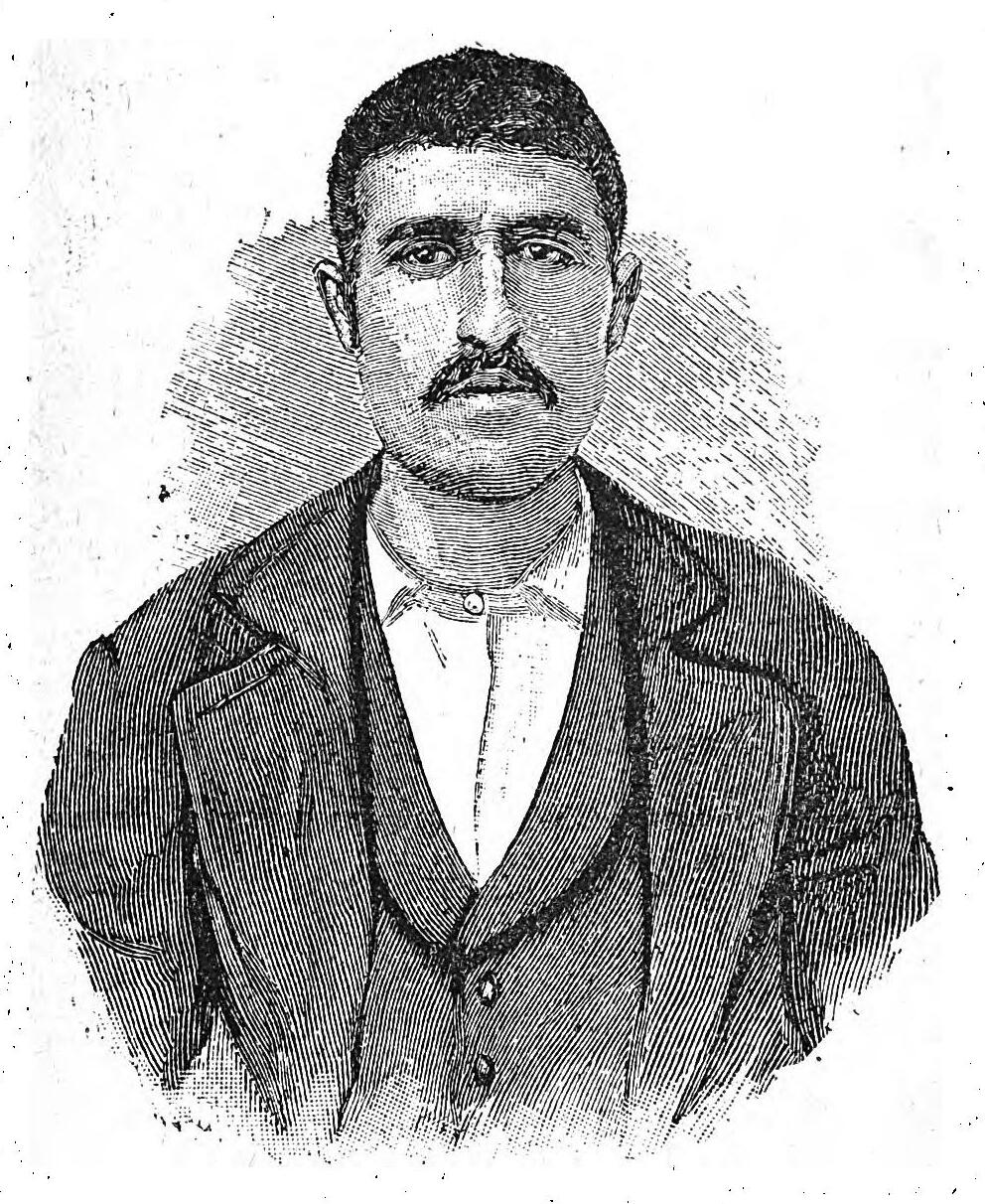
A sketch of Musolino produced around the time of his 1902 trial

Famed Italian criminologist Cesare Lombroso described Musolino as a highly intelligent, megalomaniacal "born criminal," destined from birth to engage in criminality mainly due to his epilepsy. Lombroso wrote that the family histories of epilepsy and criminality were intertwined and greatly contributed to Musolino's epileptic attacks and the resulting violent acts he committed. He also attributed Musolino's criminality to his falling into a group of southern Calabrians of Albanian and Greek heritage who were naturally predisposed to living lives of violence.

While he was being held in Catanzaro prior to this trial, Musolino had several episodes of epileptic seizures, although the prison director said he believed he was faking it. Musolino claimed during the trial that these episodes had been real and occurring for several years, with them having been at their worst while he was on the run.

During this trial, Musolino did not refute the notion that he'd killed many people; his defense was that he would shoot openly rather than ambushing his victims, that he would only kill people who had attacked him first, and that he would only kill those he deemed to be traitors. Musolino argued that he had possessed a moral justification for killing those who had lied at his first trial.

Musolino's defense was complicated by several factors. His legal team saw significant turnover; he began with ten lawyers, all of whom ended up in conflict with one another, resigned, agreed to rejoin the team, and resigned once again. In the end, Musolino had only one lawyer, an eighty-three-year-old whom he'd managed to hire during the trial. Additionally, during this trial, Musolino admitted to each instance of murder he had been accused of in court (except for the alleged attempted murder of Vincenzo Zoccali, for which he maintained his innocence).

==== Verdict ====
On July 11, 1902, the jury found Musolino guilty on all counts. They determined that Musolino's actions were rooted in a personal vendetta, finding that he had murdered 12 of the 15 witnesses who had testified against him in the Zoccali trial. They also were not convinced that he had been at all mentally impaired when committing these acts, or that he was unfit to stand trial. Furthermore, they determined these acts to be premeditated, given the threats he had made numerous times while on the run against the witnesses from his first trial. Musolino was sentenced to life in prison, including eight years of solitary confinement.

=== Imprisonment ===
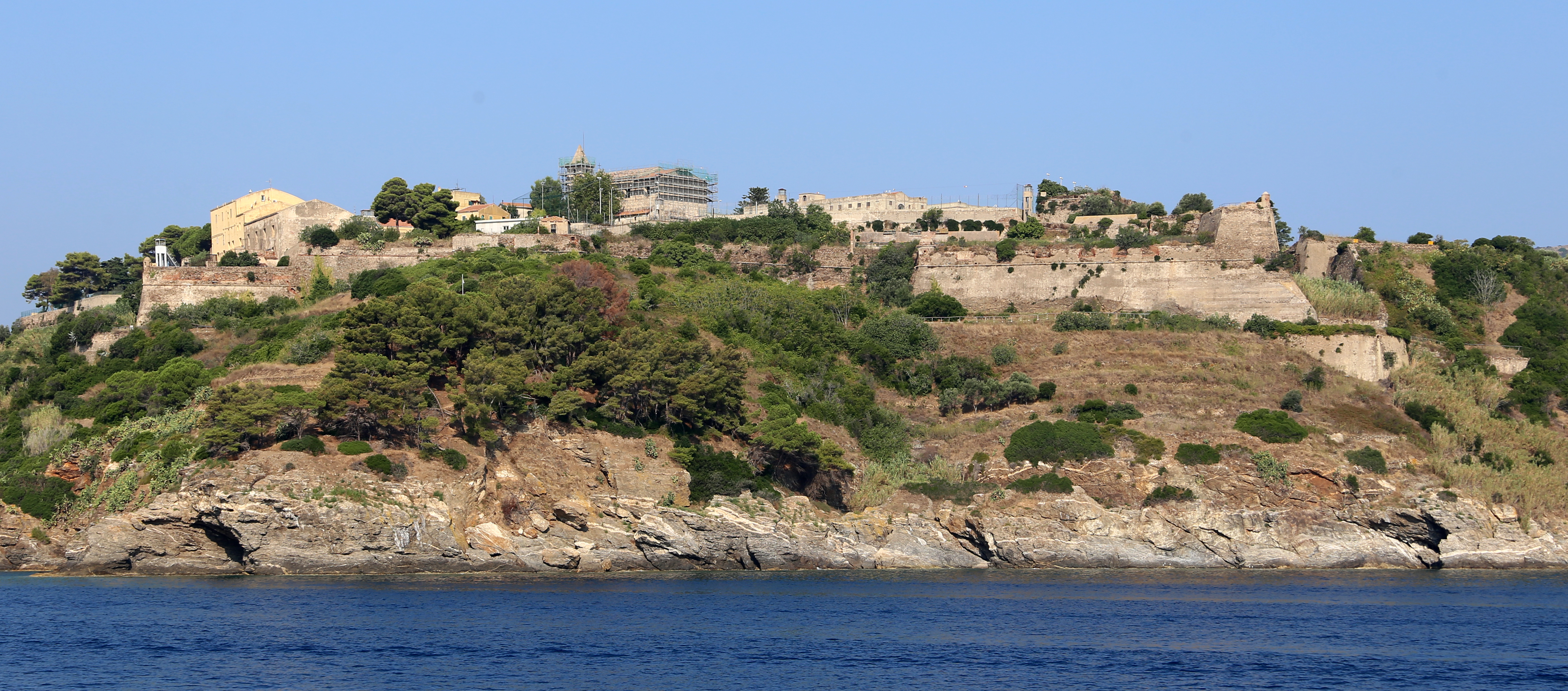
Fort Longone, where Musolino was imprisoned from 1902-1946

Musolino was initially sent to the prison at Fort Longone in Porto Azzurro, on the island of Elba. In 1907, The New York Times reported that he was "slowly becoming mad with confinement and, above all, with the solitariness of his imprisonment." Nevertheless, Musolino remained there for 44 years, until he was declared mentally insane by Italian authorities in 1946. At this point, he was transferred to an asylum in Reggio Calabria. He was kept there for the final 10 years of his life; although he was under close surveillance, he also experienced much more comfortable conditions than the ones he'd endured in prison.

As an asylum inmate, Musolino was allowed to go on walks throughout the city, where he was often greeted by flocks of onlookers. He once tried to flee the asylum, likely out of confusion resulting from his deteriorating mental state.

He died in the Reggio Calabria asylum on January 22, 1956, at the age of 79. He was buried in his hometown of Santo Stefano.

== Musolino as legend ==
Musolino was seen by his countrymen as a symbol of the injustice Calabria was facing at the time. As a fugitive, Musolino stirred the imagination of many people in Italy, becoming a legend throughout Italy and abroad.

Contributing to Musolino's status as a legend across the globe was the widespread coverage of his story in major foreign newspapers, such as The New York Times, The Washington Post, and The Times of London. Additionally, Musolino claimed to have descended from nobility, particularly on his mother's side, which led to further media fascination. Musolino was reported to have relished, and as a result actively sought, the media attention.

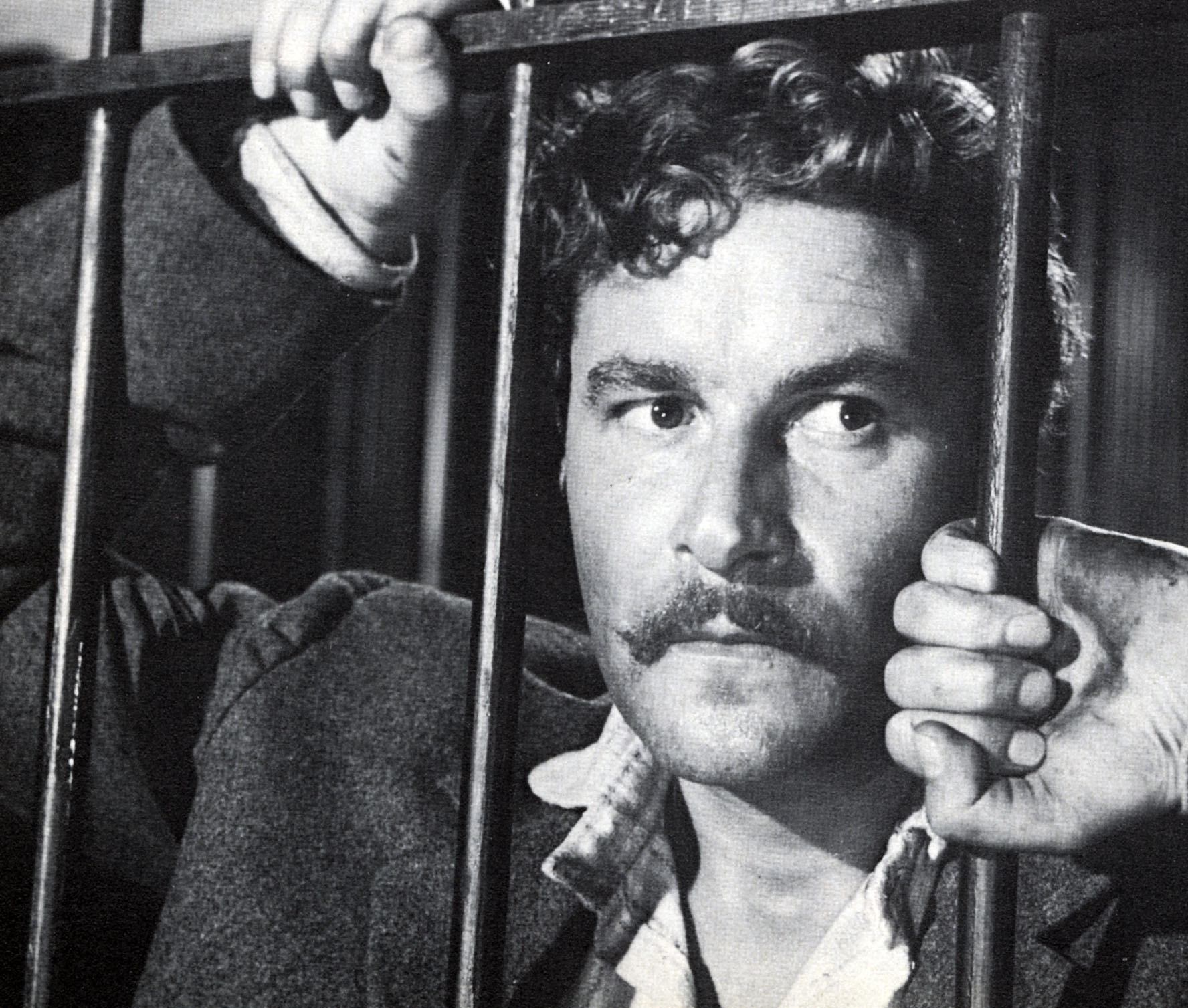
A photo of actor Amedeo Nazzari starring as Musolino in the 1950 film Il Brigante Musolino

While in prison following his second trial, Musolino's legend grew further, and he gained significant notoriety as an Italian sex symbol; he bragged about the thousands of letters he had received in prison, many of which he claimed were from women clamoring for his acquittal and physical presence. According to Musolino, one letter was signed by "a hundred women in decent position in Florence," all of whom were so infatuated with him that they'd decided to publish their letter in a Florentine newspaper.

Musolino became the subject of many Calabrian folk tales and popular songs. Musolino was the subject of songs by several famous 20th-century Calabrian singers, such as Orazio Strano and Mino Reitano.

The 1950 film Il Brigante Musolino, by Mario Camerini, was based on his life. His life story was also the subject of the concept-album Il Brigante Musolino by Otello Profazio. Cicciu Busacca also dedicated an entire album to Musolino, named La storia di lu briganti Musulinu.

== See also ==
- Eric Hobsbawm's concept of the social bandit (see also Hobsbawm, Primitive Rebels, 1959)
- Cesare Lombroso's "The Last Brigand" (1902)
