= Otello Profazio =

Italian composer (1934–2023)

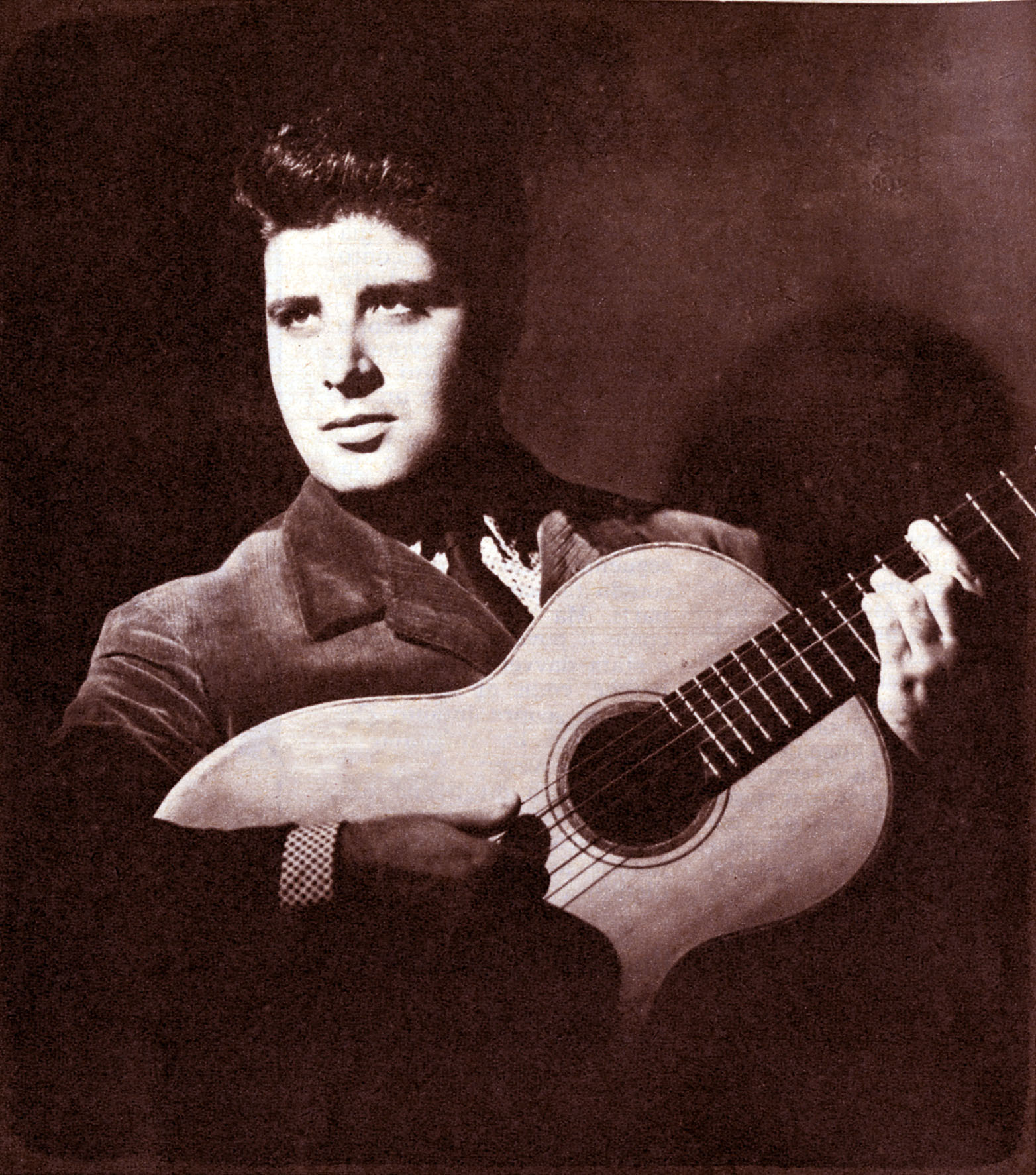
- Profazio in 1964
- Born: 26 December 1934; Rende, Kingdom of Italy
- Died: 24 July 2023 (aged 88); Reggio Calabria, Italy
- Occupations: Cantastorie, singer-songwriter

Otello Profazio (26 December 1934 – 24 July 2023) was an Italian cantastorie, folk singer-songwriter, and author.

== Biography ==
Born Otello Ermanno Profazio in Rende, Province of Cosenza, Profazio made his debut in 1953, participating in the radio music competition "Il microfono è vostro" with the song U' Ciucciu. A prominent promoter of traditional folk music from southern Italy—particularly from Sicily and Calabria—he received widespread critical acclaim in 1964 for the album Il treno del sole, which featured poems by Ignazio Buttitta set to music. This album also marked the beginning of a progressive evolution in his style, becoming increasingly original and distinctive. His career reached its peak in the 1970s, notably with the success of the album Il brigante Musolino, a musical retelling of the life of Giuseppe Musolino, and Qua si campa d'aria, which sold over a million copies and was awarded a gold disc. From the 1980s he focused his activities on live performances and concerts.

Profazio also presented several music programmes on television, notably Quando la gente canta for five years on Secondo Canale. For 15 years he also wrote weekly columns ("Profaziate") in the newspaper Gazzetta del Sud, which were later collected in a series of books.

Otello Profazio died on 24 July 2023, at the age of 88.
