= Il Brigante Musolino =

- Directed by: Mario Camerini
- Written by: Franco Brusati; Mario Camerini
- Produced by: Dino De Laurentiis; Carlo Ponti
- Starring: Amedeo Nazzari; Silvana Mangano
- Cinematography: Aldo Tonti
- Edited by: Adriana Novelli
- Music by: Enzo Masetti
- Distributed by: Lux Film
- Release date: 1950
- Running time: 94 minutes
- Country: Italy
- Language: Italian

Il Brigante Musolino (Italian: The Brigand Musolino), released in the United States as Outlaw Girl, is a 1950 Italian crime drama film inspired by the life of the Calabrian outlaw Giuseppe Musolino. It was directed and co-written by Mario Camerini. The film stars Amedeo Nazzari and Silvana Mangano.

== Cast ==
- Amedeo Nazzari as Giuseppe ("Peppino" or "Beppe") Musolino
- Silvana Mangano as Mara
- Ignazio Balsamo as Schepisi
- Guido Celano as Police Sergeant
- Rocco D'Assunta as The Sacristan
- Arnoldo Foà
- Giacomo Giuradi as Marco Sgroli
- Elvira Betrone
- Nino Pavese as Innkeeper
- Umberto Spadaro as The Doctor
