= Etta Scollo =

Italian singer and songwriter (born 1958)

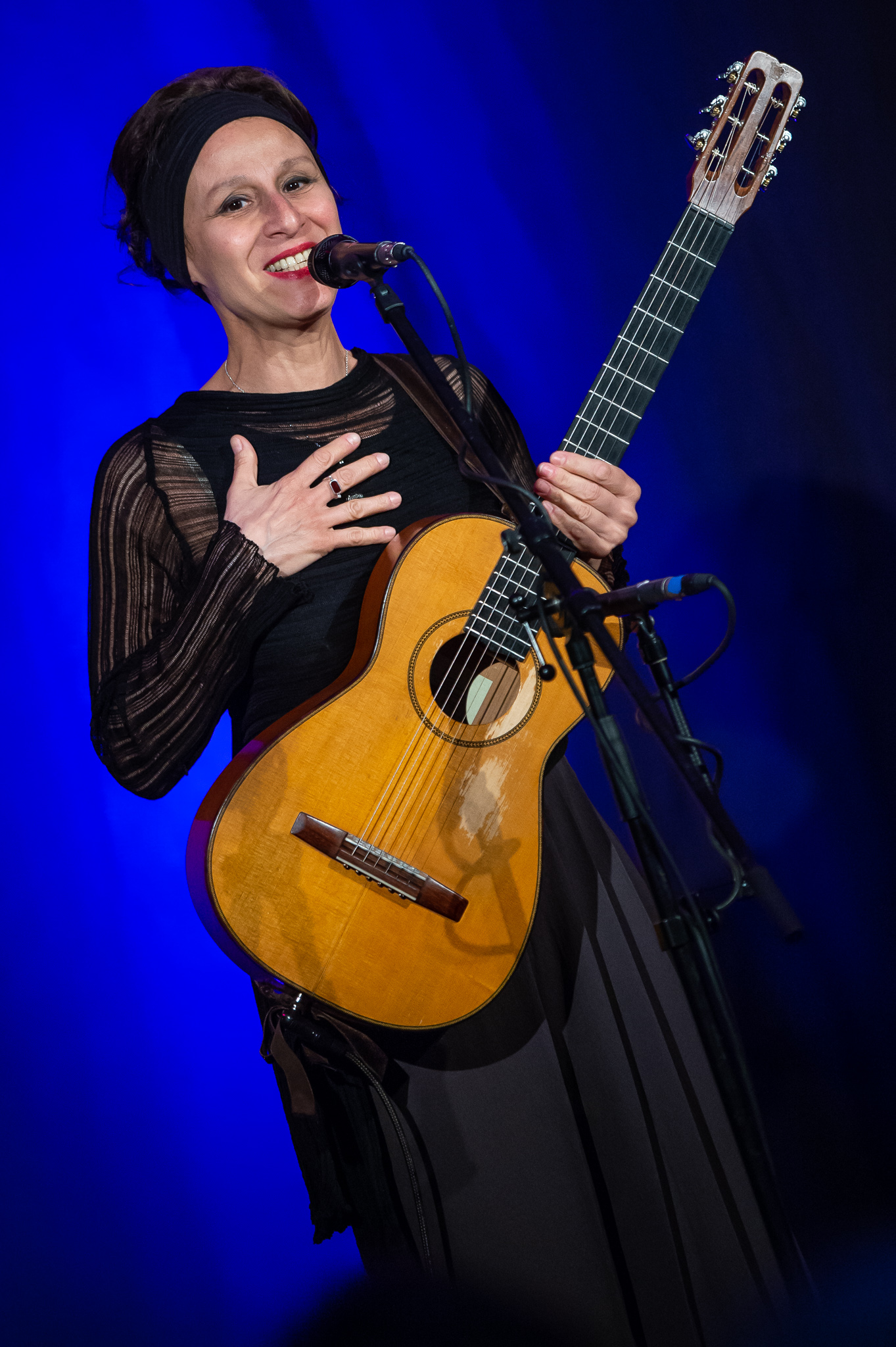
- Scollo in 2018

Background information
- Born: 27 May 1958 (age 68); Catania, Italy
- Genres: Folk, pop, jazz
- Occupations: Singer, songwriter
- Instruments: Vocals, guitar
- Years active: 1988–present
- Website: www.ettascollo.com

Etta Scollo (born 27 May 1958) is an Italian singer and songwriter. Her music combines traditional Sicilian music, pop and jazz. In 1990, she received the Grand Prix of the Golden Orpheus International Vocal Competition. In 1991 she took 3rd place at the International Song Festival in Sopot.

== Biography ==
Born in Catania, Sicily, she moved to Turin to study Architecture. She abandoned her studies to devote herself to music. Between 1983 and 1987 she worked with artists such as saxophonist Eddie Davis, Sunnyland Slim and Champion Jack Dupree, both in the recording studio and in concerts. Chance encounters with producers from the Pop music scene led to the recording of the Paul McCartney song Oh! Darling, which Etta adapted with Italian lyrics in 1988. This song became No. 1 in the Austrian charts. In the 1990s she moved to Hamburg where she, along with the musical Ensemble L'art pour l'Art, undertook experiments with contemporary music. She composed film scores – for example I tuoi fiori for the film Bad Guy by Kim Ki-duk.

The Project Canta Ro' – Homage for Rosa Balistreri she brought the music of famous Sicilian singer Rosa Balistreri back to life. Among her most ambitious projects is Lunaria, released in 2014: it is about transforming the homonymous fantastic short-story authored by the Sicilian writer Vincenzo Consolo into music by imagining it as score (academic counseling: Dagmar Reichardt).

== Discography ==
- Etta Scollo (1989)
- Io vivro (1991)
- Blu (1999)
- Il Bianco del Tempo (2002)
- In Concerto (Live CD) (2002)
- Casa (2003)
- Canta Ro (2005)
- Canta Ro in Trio (2006)
- Les Siciliens (2007)
- Il Fiore Splendente (2008)
- Cuoresenza (2011)
- Lunaria (2014)
- Scollo con Cello: tempo al tempo (2015) with Susanne Paul
- Il Passo Interiore (2018)
