= Music of Calabria =

The music of Calabria is part of the Italian musical tradition. Like other regions in southern Italy, Calabria for many centuries was an integral part of the kingdom of Naples, and, as with other regions, the musical life tended to be overshadowed by the important activities in the capital city to the north—the conservatories there, the composers, the vast amount of music performed in churches (see also Music of Naples). Yet, modern Calabria has developed a vibrant musical life based on its history and, as well, a dedication to building new musical and theatrical facilities, many of which are of the type termed polivalenti in Italian—that is, multi-purpose.

== History ==
The Popular love songs have always been at the heart of Calabrian tradition. When a young man fell in love with a girl, he would go to her house at night with friends to declare his yearning passion.

== Folk music ==
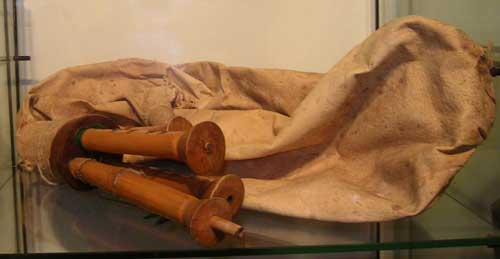
The zampogna, a folk bagpipe.

The rural Calabrian folk tradition is most closely associated with the zampogna, the Italian bagpipe, which is found across Italy but is an especially important part of the Calabrian tradition. Calabria is home to at least five different kinds of zampogna. This tradition has lately been recorded and adapted by the group Re Niliu. There is also an ancient Lira (violin) tradition, pipita and tambourine.

=== Songs ===
The most famous love songs are:

- Calabrisella
- Cioparedda
- Riturnella
- La Nicastrisa

and the most famous songs for tarantella:

- Volia mi maritu
- Lu tirannu mbelenatu
- Damme lu core
- Chi jati sonandu

== Musical and theatrical facilities ==
Catanzaro's Teatro Politeama is a new version (2002) of an older theater. It is run by the Catanzaro Foundation for the Politeama Theater and is solidly dedicated to continuing a great operatic tradition. They have already staged Franco Zeffirelli's version of Aida as well as productions of Rigoletto. There is a secondary theater, the Teatro Masciari, once famous as a vaudeville house; after the inevitable post-war decline it has known a modern rebirth as a multi-purpose facility.

The Teatro Rendano, in Cosenza, is the only truly traditional theater in Calabria. It was built in 1909, severely damaged by the aerial bombardments of World War II, closed, rebuilt and finally reopened. It has a reputation for fine acoustics and being a beautiful venue for performers and audiences alike. Two associations are connected with the very active performance schedule: the Associazione Quintieri and Associazone Jonica. The city is the site of the Stanislao Giocamantonio music conservatory, housed on the premises of the old Santa Maria delle Grazie convent.

Particularly given to emphasizing its Greek history (it was the site of the ancient academy of Pythagoras), Crotone takes advantage of some impressive archaeology as venues for music. Best-known is the Aurora Festival on the grounds of the Temple of Hera Lacinia, which featured a festival dedicated to the music of Greek composer Mikis Theodorakis.

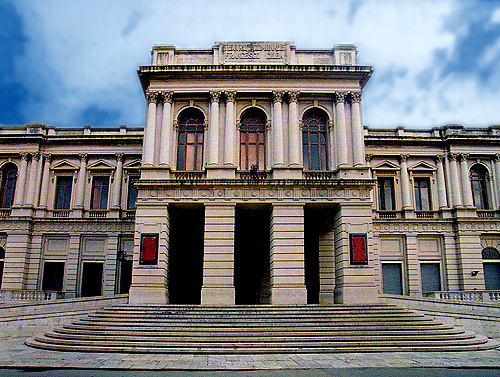
The Cilea Theater in Reggio di Calabria.

The Teatro Comunale Cilea of Reggio di Calabria was built in 1818 and was originally one of the great royal opera houses in the Kingdom of Naples. It was severely damaged by the 1908 Messina earthquake and again by bombing in World War II. It has since been rebuilt and reopened and pursues an active operatic schedule. The city is also the site of the Francesco Cilea music conservatory, named for the "favorite son" composer.

The Fausto Torrefranca music conservatory is located in Vibo Valentia. The Solisti Calabri is an active chamber music ensemble, and the Cilea Association sponsors regular concerts.

== See also ==
- Calabrian Tarantella
