= Ignazio Buttitta =

Italian poet (1899–1997)

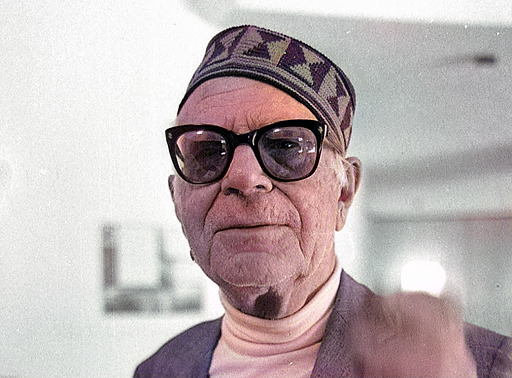
- Buttitta in the 1980s
- Born: 19 September 1899; Bagheria, Italy
- Died: 5 April 1997 (aged 97)
- Occupation: Poet

Ignazio Buttitta (19 September 1899 – 5 April 1997) was an Italian poet who wrote predominantly in Sicilian.

== Biography ==
Born in Bagheria, Italy into a merchant's family, after having taken part in World War I Buttitta joined the Italian Socialist Party and around this time started to write poetry in Sicilian. His first volume of poetry published was Sintimintali (Sentimental), followed in 1928 by Marabedda. Soon after, Buttitta relocated to Milan, where he achieved some success in the commercial world while continuing to pursue his passion for literature. Due to his political leanings, he had to leave Milan during World War II; after which he joined the Resistance, was jailed by the fascists, and narrowly avoided the death penalty, before returning to Milan, where he spent time with Sicilian intellectuals such as Elio Vittorini, Salvatore Quasimodo and Renato Guttuso. In 1954 he published his new book of poetry, Lu pani si chiama pani (The bread is called bread), financed by the Italian Communist Party. In this volume he defined himself as Pueta e latru (Poet and thief), an allusion to the manner in which he would pass among the people like a thief, appropriating their feelings, and leaving behind a sentimental thread. This was especially the case with his nostalgia for his homeland, but there are also more socially-oriented themes, in particular, protests against the social situation of Italy and Sicily, such as A stragi di Purtedda (1947, about Salvatore Giuliano and the Portella della Ginestra massacre), and Lamentu per la morte di Turiddu Carnevale (1956, about Salvatore Carnevale - a Sicilian trade unionist from Sciara who was killed by the Mafia on 16 May 1955 - and his mother Francesca Serio).

In 1964 cantastorie and folk singer-songwriter Otello Profazio set to music several Buttitta's poems in the album Il treno del sole (also known as Profazio Canta Buttitta). In 1972 Buttitta won the Viareggio Prize, for the volume Io faccio il poeta (I am a poet). His works have been translated into French, Russian and Greek.

Buttitta, during his career as a poet, has never hidden his pride in being Sicilian, and his love for the language of the island. In one of his most famous poems, Lingua e dialettu (Language and dialect), he explicitly talks about language as a key issue for his people, and implores his fellows Sicilians to preserve their language:

Un populu
diventa poviru e servu
quannu ci arrubbanu a lingua
addutata di patri:
è persu pi sempri.

Translation:

A people
becomes poor and servile
when their language is stolen from them
inherited from their forefathers:
it is lost forever.

A contemporary Berlin-based Sicilian folk singer, Etta Scollo, celebrates the work of Sicilian folk singer and Buttitta associate, Rosa Balistreri, including rendering a version of Buttitta's The Pirates of Palermo:

Arrivaru li navi
Tanti navi a Palermu
Li pirati sbarcaru
Cu li facci d’infernu

N’arrubbaru lu suli, lu suli
Arristamu a lu scuru,
chi scuru
Sicilia chianci!

Tuttu l’oru a l’aranci
Li pirati arrubbaru
Li campagni spugghiati
Cu la negghia lassaru

N’arrubbaru lu suli, lu suli
Arristamu a lu scuru,
chi scuru
Sicilia chianci!

Li culura dû mari
N’arrubbaru chi dannu
Su ‘mpazzuti li pisci
Chi lamentu ca fannu

N’arrubbaru lu suli, lu suli
Arristamu a lu scuru,
chi scuru
Sicilia chianci!

A li fìmmini nostri
Ci scipparu di l’occhi
La lustrura e lu focu
Ca addumava li specchi

N’arrubbaru lu suli, lu suli
Arristamu a lu scuru,
chi scuru
Sicilia chianci!

Translation:

The ships arrive
So many ships at Palermo
The pirates come ashore
With infernal faces

They steal from us the sun, the sun
We are left in darkness
what a darkness
Sicily weeps!

All the gold of the oranges
The pirates steal away
Their rapacious campaigns
In the fog they create

They steal from us the sun, the sun
We are left in darkness
what a darkness
Sicily weeps!

The colours of the sea
They steal those from us, an outrage!
The fish are so crazed
As to lament their existence

They steal from us the sun, the sun
We are left in darkness
what a darkness
Sicily weeps!

From our women's eyes
They tear out
The splendour and fire
Which lit up mirrors

They steal from us the sun, the sun
We are left in darkness
what a darkness
Sicily weeps!

== See also ==
- Rosa Balistreri
- Fausto Cannone
- Folclore
- Giuseppe Pitrè
