= Fausto Cannone =

Italian singer-songwriter (1938–2019)

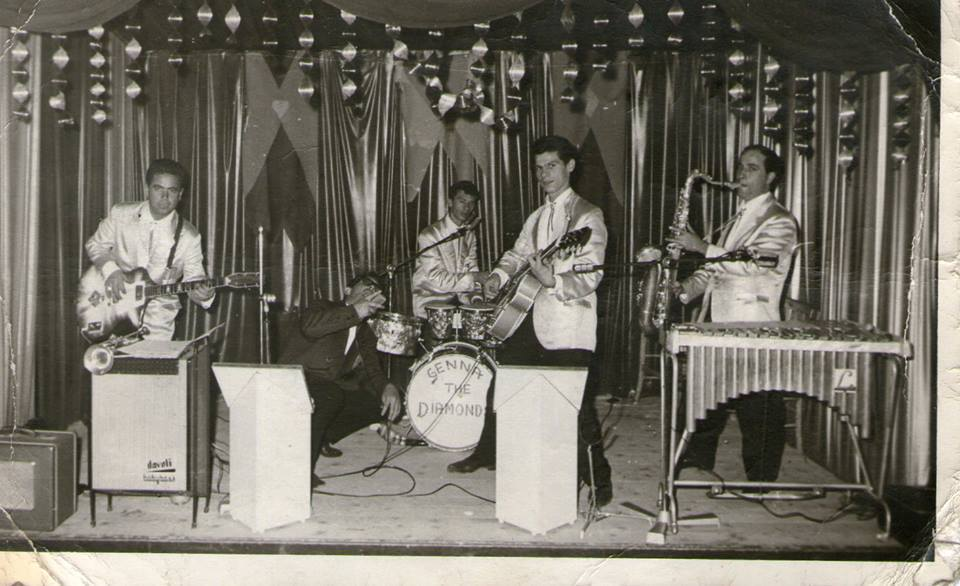
- One of his first bands

Background information
- Born: Fausto Cannone; 3 January 1938; Alcamo, Italy
- Died: 9 January 2017 (aged 79) Alcamo, Italy
- Genres: Popular music, Italian folk
- Occupation: Singer-songwriter
- Instruments: Vocals, guitar, acoustic guitar, classical guitar
- Years active: 1964–2017

Fausto Cannone (1 March 1938 – 9 January 2017) was an Italian singer-songwriter, teacher and poet.

== Biography ==
Fausto Cannone was born in Alcamo, in the province of Trapani on March 1, 1938; he was the son of Gaspare Cannone (a literary reviewer and an anarchist who immigrated to the U.S.A.); his mother died when he was just a child, so he had an unhappy adolescence.

He began his artistic career in the '60s by playing as a guitarist and lead singer in some bands in Genoa, where he met Fabrizio De André, Luigi Tenco and other singers.

After returning to Sicily, he got a degree in canto at the Conservatorio Alessandro Scarlatti in Palermo, then he studied with maestro Eliodoro Sollima (harmony and composition). He also taught musical education in grammar schools for several years. In the late '70s Cannone started to dedicate to popular music and created about 700 works which included ballads, songs and poems inspired by the traditions and people of his homeland.

As he did not like the music business, he published only a few albums in the last years of his life.

== With Ignazio Buttitta and Rosa Balistreri ==
Thanks to the collaboration with the Sicilian poet Ignazio Buttitta and Rosa Balistreri, Fausto Cannone has discovered his love for his land and for the people who have fought for Sicily. He set to music 16 poems and a comedy for Buttitta who wrote about Cannone: Faustu Cannuni sona la chitarra cu li irita e la libertà cu lu cori (translation: Fausto Cannone plays the guitar with fingers and freedom with the heart.)

He travelled with Rosa Balistreri all over Europe; Cannone was her guitar-man for 5 years. He participated, with her and Peppino Gagliardi, in the television program entitled Un'ora per voi introduced by Corrado.

In 2008 he published the album Diario d'amore musiche per sognare and received, together with Massimo Ranieri, the prize Pigna d'argento at Teatro Politeama in Palermo.

== Civil commitment in his works ==
The fight against violence, in favour of peace and freedom are the values which Cannone transmits through his songs; in 2017 he published the second album called In nome della legalità: a collection of the stories and heritages of men like Paolo Borsellino, Giovanni Falcone, Rocco Chinnici, Dalla Chiesa, Rosario Livatino, Ludovico Corrao, Peppino Impastato, Mauro Rostagno. The songs in this cd – said Fausto Cannone – are dedicated to all the victims of mafia who devoted their own lives to the values of legality and justice, who will continue to live in the memory of all those people believing and fighting for a just cause. A cd which is also a teaching for young people and that wants to send a message of legality, respect for rules and to fight against mafia at all levels.

His songs reveal his pessimism, due to an unhappy childhood, the courage for suffer and fighting, without the acceptance of any compromises, which he inherited from his father, Gaspare.

Fausto Cannone sings about characters of different types: from Padre Pio to Giovanni Falcone, from Madre Teresa di Calcutta to Paolo Borsellino. These songs were often presented in different seminaries on Peace and Legality in various Italian cities.

He used the Sicilian dialect as the language of communication; he also believed in the survival of folklore inside music because our traditions live with it, and we are rooted in it.

== Museum of Multiethnic Musical Instruments "Fausto Cannone" ==
A museum in Sicily was founded through Fausto Cannone's donation of more than 200 string and wind instruments.

The museum hosts more than 200 instruments coming from several European countries, Thailand, Tibet, New Guinea, South America, Polynesia, China, Australia, Argentina and South Africa. Most are simple instruments made with parts of plants and animals, but there are also valuable craft products.

He wanted to dedicate the museum to his father's memory, Gaspare Cannone who was a journalist, literary critic, anarchist and antifascist.

== Discography ==
- 2008: DIARIO D'AMORE MUSICHE PER SOGNARE; it contains the following songs:
1. Diario d'amore
2. E la terra odorerà di ciclamino
3. Tutto scorre
4. Elegia notturna
5. Abbracciati
6. Verso il paradiso
7. Tra le navate di una chiesa
8. Fuori dal tempo
9. Ti racconto l'amore
10. Amore negli abissi
11. Oltre l'amore
12. Rime di un sogno
13. Un angelo in preghiera
- 2017: IN NOME DELLA LEGALITA', with these songs:
1. In nome della legalità
2. Anni di piombo
3. Giovanni Falcone
4. Paolo Borsellino
5. Omertà
6. Rosario Livatino
7. Carlo Alberto Dalla Chiesa
8. Ludovico Corrao
9. Mauro Rostagno
10. Peppino Impastato
11. Rocco Chinnici
12. Sicilia matri mia
13. Inno alla pace

Before these works, he had made some 45 rpm records, such as: Pedrito el Drito, Perfida, Addio Matera and "Mi piaceva da morire", winner of a prize in Montecarlo. He also composed other musical works, some of them in the Sicilian dialect, and poems.

== Main concerts ==
- 1976 and 1977: Bedford in the United Kingdom
- 1982: Australia
- 1986: Marsala
- 1987: Stadio La Favorita in Palermo
- 1988: Palasport of Varese
- 1989: Benares (India)
- 1990 and 1991: Cuba, Theatre Garcia Lorca
- 1992: China, at the Hotel Marco Polo
- 1993: Finland
- 1994: Stati Uniti
- 1996: Teatro Massimo, Palermo
- 2000: Empoli

== Prizes and acknowledgements ==
- Silver cup, Palasport of Varese (1992)
- Oscar Giordano Bruno (2005-2014), Palazzo delle Aquile in Messina
- Oscar del Mediterraneo (2006), Teatro Politeama in Palermo
- National Prize Nino Martoglio, Syracuse (2006)
- National Prize Liolà, VIII edition (2006)
- Satiro Bronzeo (2007), Teatro Politeama, Palermo
- La Pigna D’Argento (2008),
- Premio Cultura Unesco (2010)
- Acknowledgement Donna Fugata (2010)
- Gran Galà dello Sport Città di Alcamo (2010)
- Acknowledgement by the Rotary Club of Castellammare del Golfo (2011)
- Prize for the World Day of Poetry (2013)
- Diploma honoris causa in Science of Communication, by ISLAS (Ist.Superiore di Lettere Arti e Scienze del Mediterraneo) on 3 November 2013
- Gran Galà del Maestro Riino (2014)
- Acknowledgement by Kiwanis (2015)
- Premio Festival Songs below the stars (2016)
- Prize Kiwanis 2015–2016, given for his credits in the artistic-musical field and for the donation of his collection of ethnic-musical instruments
- Prize for the Provincial Day of legality (2017), received by the Consulta provinciale degli studenti
- Member of the Accademia di Sicilia
- Honorary member of the Rotary Club Terre degli Elimi

== See also ==
- Museum of Multiethnic Musical Instruments "Fausto Cannone"
- Alcamo
- Calandra & Calandra
- Rosa Balistreri
- Ignazio Buttitta
- Folclore

== Sources ==
- Marianna Ingrao: La musica popolare di ieri e di oggi nell'esperienza di Fausto Cannone; Palermo, Università degli Studi, facoltà di Scienze della Comunicazione, anno accademico 2014-2015
- Giacomo Romano Davare: Il potere e l'anima p. 90, ed.Thule, Palermo, 2014
- "Cannone il collezionista della musica".
- "Il kiwanis festeggia la sua fondazione, assegnato a Fausto Cannone il premio kiwaniano".
- "addio matera / mi piaceva, mi piaceva da morire".
- "Fausto Cannone".
- "Alcamo-Inno alla legalità nel cd di Fausto Cannone".
- "Il Museo degli strumenti musicali multietnici Fausto Cannone di Alcamo e la poliedricità del musicista, del cantautore, del poeta, del collezionista di emozioni e sentimenti".
- "Strumenti musicali multietnici ad Alcamo".
