= Ciccio Busacca =

Cicciu Busacca
- Birth name: Francesco Busacca
- Also known as: Ciccio Busacca
- Born: 15 February 1925; Paternò, Kingdom of Italy
- Died: 11 September 1989 (aged 64); Busto Arsizio, Italy
- Genres: Folk music; musica siciliana
- Occupations: Singer-songwriter; cantastorie
- Instrument: Guitar
- Years active: 1951–1989
- Labels: I dischi del Sole

Francesco Busacca, better known as Cicciu or Ciccio Busacca (15 February 1925 – 11 September 1989), was born in Paternò, province of Catania. He was one of the best known Sicilian ballad singers. Dario Fo, playwright and composer, wrote "Ci ragiono e canto N.3" for him.

Busacca's album La storia di lu briganti Musulinu was named after Italian brigand Giuseppe Musolino.

== Bibliography ==
- Dario Fo biography at nobelprize.org
- Italian music history at worlddiscoveries.net
- Cicciu Busacca (in Italian) at www.irsap-agrigentum.it
