= Ciaramedda =

The ciaramedda or ciaramèddha (Sicilian) is a type of zampogna with equal length double chanters. Other terms for this instrument include "zampogna a paru" and "terzalora" or simply "cornamuse".

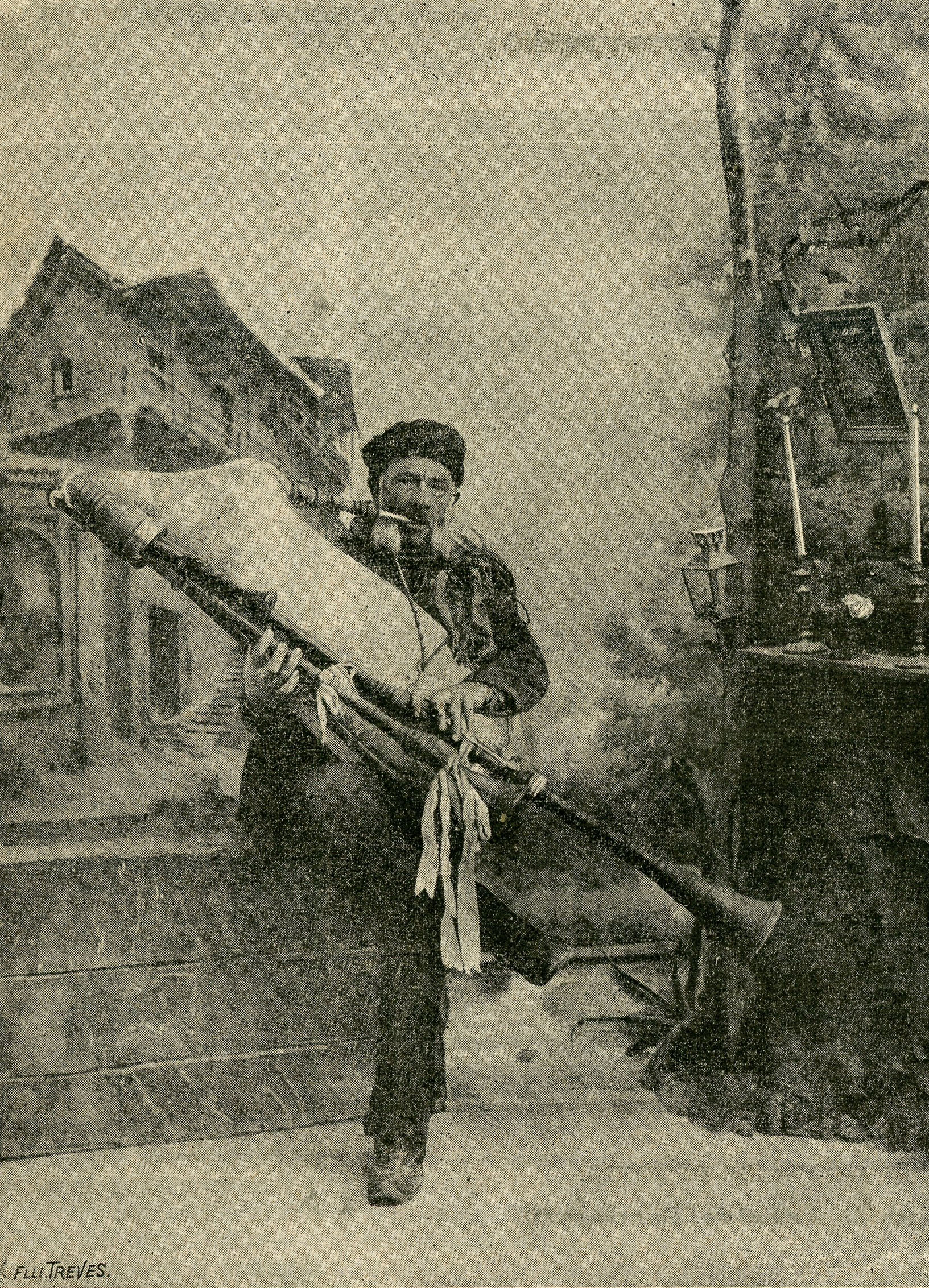
Sicilian Christmas costumes: the ciaramedda (Milan, 1895)

The ciaramedda is native to the rural areas of Sicily and Calabria, particularly in the provinces of Messina and Reggio Calabria, though it can also be found in the provinces of Catania, Agrigento, Enna, Siracusa and as far north as Catanzaro.

The instrument consists of a bag (usually of goatskin), a blowpipe to inflate the bag, and two chanters which play a melody and harmony (or counter-rhythm), which are generally made of heather wood or any type of native grown fruit wood. The three drones, which provide constant harmony, are known as bassu, quatta, and fisciettu. Some pipes just have two drones. In Sicily, often only the middle drone is reeded while the other two remain muted and serve only as decoration.

The ciaramedda became less prominent in Sicilian culture with the decline of European pastoral culture; however, it survives in the context of religious festivals, particularly during Christmas. In Reggio Calabria the instrument still enjoys secular use and is one of the principal instruments used in communal dances, accompanied by a tambourine to play the tarantella.

In the Messinese dialect the single blade cane reed mounted in the chanters and drones is called a "zammara." In the province of Catania the reed is called a "zampogna."
