= Zampogna =

Italian bagpipe

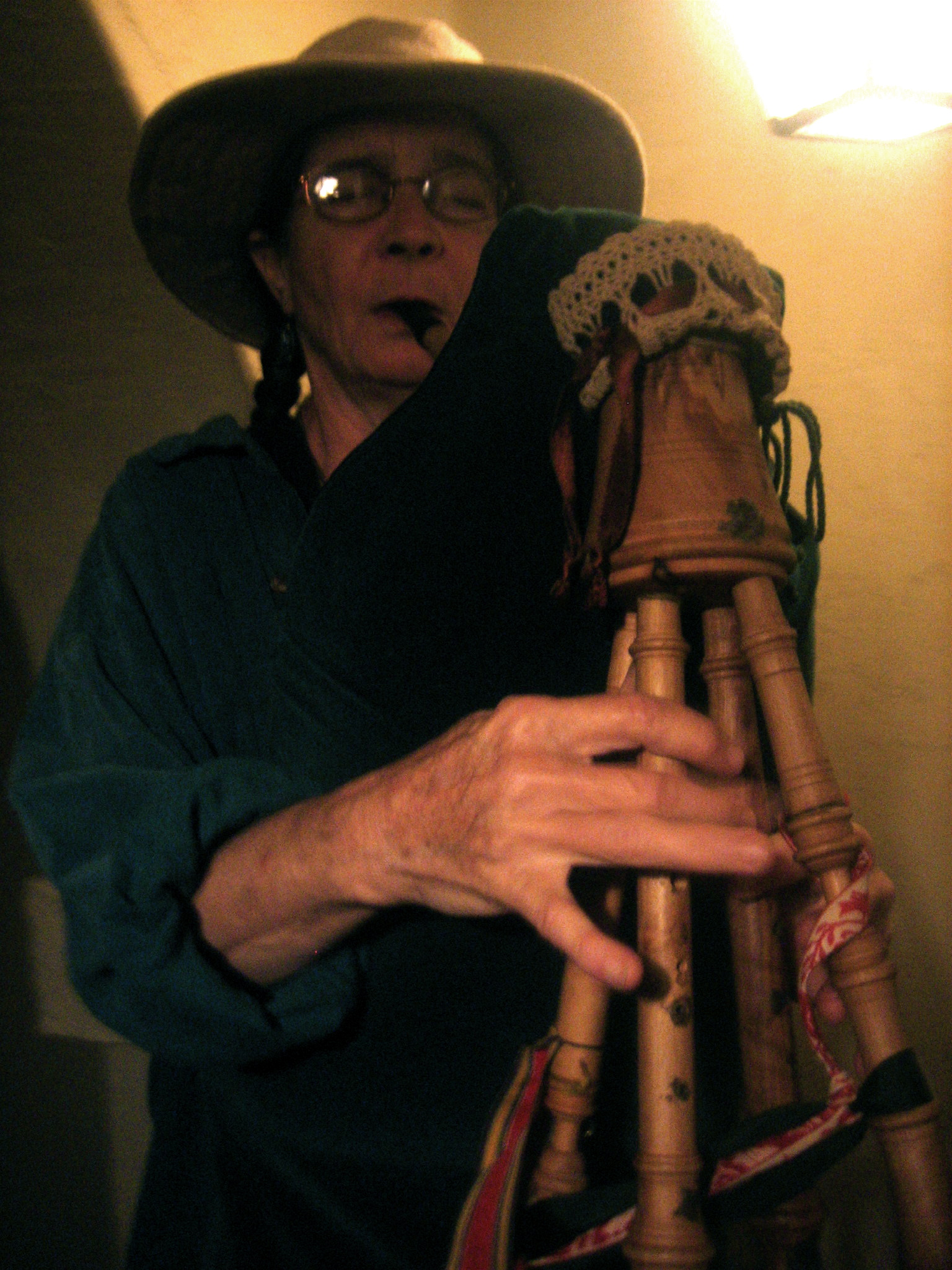
Zampogna

Zampogna (UK: /zæmˈpɒnjə/ zam-PON-yə, US: /zæmˈpoʊnjə, sɑːmˈ-/ zam-POHN-yə, sahm-, Italian: [tsamˈpoɲɲa, dzamˈpoɲɲa]) is a generic term for a number of Italian double chantered bagpipes that can be found throughout areas in Latium. The tradition is now mostly associated with Christmas, and the most famous Italian carol, "Tu scendi dalle stelle", is derived from traditional zampogna music. However, there is an ongoing resurgence of the instrument in secular use seen with the increasing number of folk music festivals and folk music every December by Italian ensembles.

== Etymology ==
The word zampogna derives from the Latin symphonia. It is etymologically related to the Greek sumphōnía (συμφωνία), meaning "concord or unison of sound" (from σῠν- syn-, "with, together" + φωνή phōnḗ, "sound") and applied later to a type of bagpipe. It is a cognate of Greek tsampouna, the word for the Greek island bagpipe (itself a reborrowing of zampogna); Romanian cimpoi, which means "symphony" or "many sounds played together"; Georgian čiboni; and Spanish zampoña, which refers to Andean pan pipes.

== Construction ==
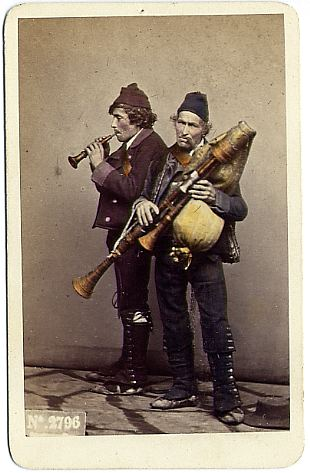

Video of a zampogna performance

All chanters and drones are fixed into a single round stock that the bag is attached to. Each chanter is tuned differently, according to the tradition it represents, and there are dozens. Typically, the double-reeded versions will have a soprano chanter on the right and a bass chanter on the left (called, respectively, ritta and manga—meaning 'right' and 'left'—in the tradition of Southern Latium) with an alto drone (bordone being the generic name); but as many as three drones, the other tuned above and below the basic chord can be used, or, in the case of the Marches tradition, no drones at all. The single reed versions consist of the surdullina types of the Province of Cosenza and Catanzaro, and the ciaramella or ciaramedda of Messina and Catania in Sicily, as well as in Southern Calabria. The surdullina is a very short chantered version of the instrument that is used to play tarantellas primarily, while the ciaramedda can play all of the traditional regional melodies the other types can.

The traditional reeds are made from stalks of the Giant Reed Arundo donax, called "canna marina" in Italian. The double reed versions may also be made from plastic. The single reeds are made from a single section of the cane.

Traditionally the bags are made from goat hides that are removed from the slaughtered animal in one piece, cured, turned inside out, then tied off just in front of the rear legs, one of the front legs serving to house the blow pipe with its simple leather valve (soffietto), and the other tied off. The typical round stock into which both chanters and drones are fixed goes into the neck of the skin. The hair is left on, and is contained in the inside of the bag (otre). Today, however, some pipers are substituting the traditional goat and sheep hide bags with a rubber inner tube or wintex which is covered with an artificial fleece. This practice of using the synthetic bag is particularly popular among the pipers from Scapoli in the Molise region, and those of Atina in Latium.

A keyed Lucanian zampogna documented by the Metropolitan Museum of Art illustrates how makers matched woods to different structural functions: softer, more workable maple was used for the bells and stock, while harder olive wood was selected for the melodic-pipe bores to support stable tuning. Its oilcloth bag and synthetic-resin mouthpiece were probably later additions associated with twentieth-century European experiments in alternatives to animal hide; according to the museum's curatorial account, such substitutes did not displace goat hide in present-day zampogna making.

== Musical traditions ==
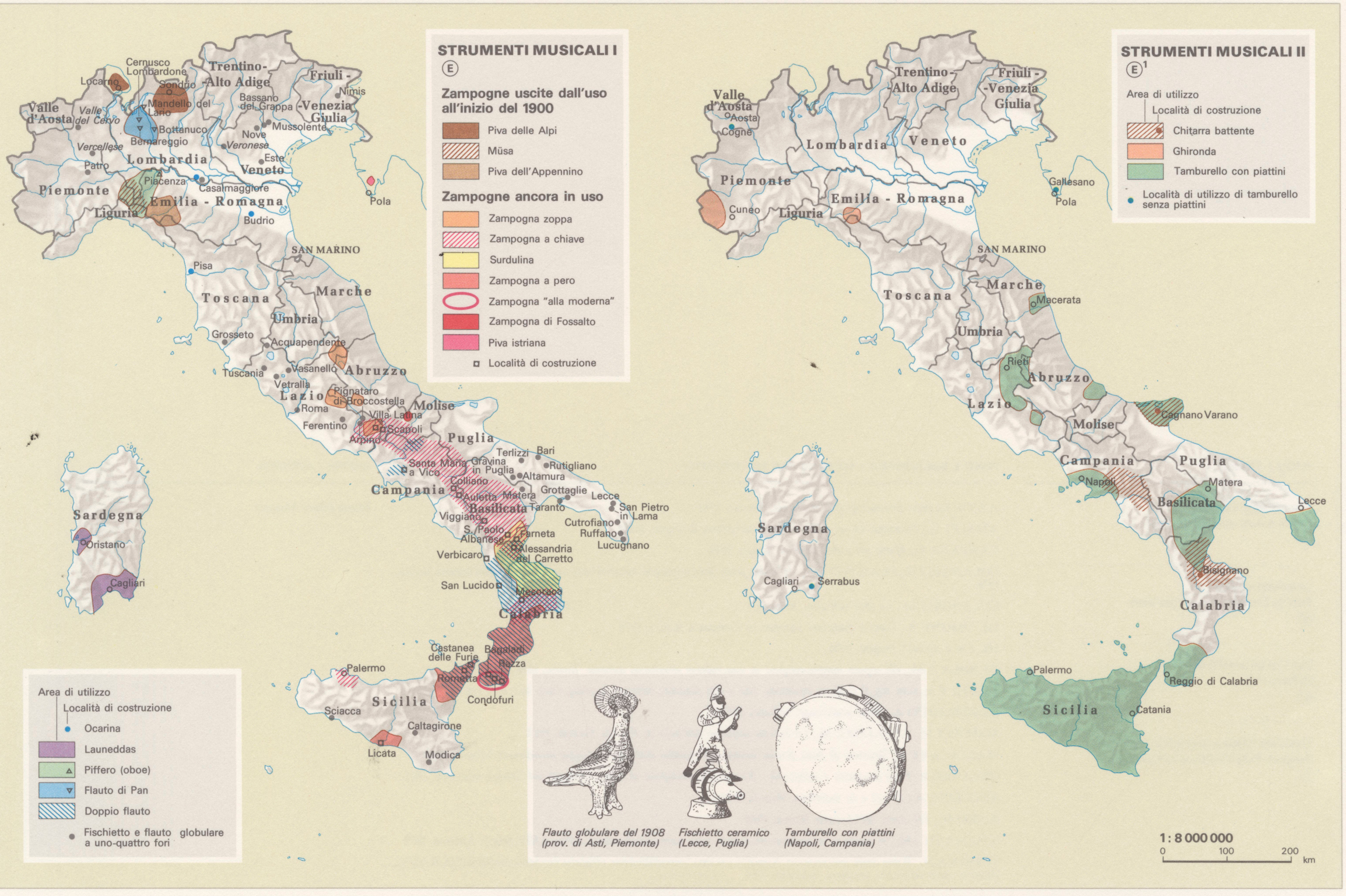
Map folk musical instruments in Italy

The double reeded version of the zampogna is generally played with the piffero (called biffera in Lazio, or ciaramella or pipita in other regions; a shawm, or folk oboe), which plays the melody and the zampogna provides chord changes, "vamping" or rhythmic harmony figures or a bass line and a soprano harmony as accompaniment. This double reed tradition would include Central Italy (Latium, southern Abruzzo and Molise), that of southern Basilicata (Pollino) and nearby areas of Calabria, and some areas of Sicily (Syracuse, Palermo). Single reed versions are played solo in the Calabrian tradition of the surdullina (Cosenza), and a version with a plugged chanter called the surdullina albanese, and the Sicilian ciaramedda or ciaramella (Catania, Messina, and Reggio Calabria). The chanters and drones vary, according to the tradition, from a few inches long (surdullina) to nearly two meters in length, such as used in the cathedral of Monreale (Palermo) and nearly every size in between. The pipes are related to the Sardinian launeddas, a single reed "triple clarinet" comprising two chanters and a drone and played in the mouth by circular breathing.

== History ==
- There is a bagpipe museum, the Museo della Zampogna in Scapoli, Molise.
- In 2010 a feature-length documentary about the zampogna was published entitled, Zampogna: The Soul of Southern Italy

== See also ==
- Bagpipes
- Music of Calabria
- Music of Italy
- Music of Sicily
- Types of bagpipes
