= Povorot (song) =

Song by Mashina Vremeni
- Written: 1979
- Released: 1987
- Genre: Rock
- Length: 3:38
- Label: Melodiya
- Composers: Alexandr Kutikov; Pyotr Podgorodetsky
- Lyricist: Andrey Makarevich

"Povorot" (Russian: «Поворо́т», lit. 'Turn') is a song by Mashina Vremeni, written in 1979 by Alexandr Kutikov (music) and Andrey Makarevich (lyrics). Pyotr Podgorodetsky assisted with the arrangement of the song and is often credited as a co-writer.

"Povorot" made it into the only official music chart at the time, Zvukovaya Dorozhka in the newspaper Moskovskij Komsomolets, and spent eighteen months at the top.

It remains one of the band's most popular songs. The song was ranked fourth in the list of the 100 best Russian rock songs of the 20th century published by Nashe Radio on December 31, 2000. In 2015, the song's lyrics were ranked 30th in the top 100 most popular poetic lines in Russian society, according to the results of a sociological study by Russian Reporter (Russian: Русский репортёр) magazine.

== General information ==
The song was first officially released in 1987 on the album Desyat let spustya (Russian: Десять лет спустя, lit. 'Ten Years Later'). The song was also included on other compilations and on all of the group's concert albums.

The song was included in the second version of the conceptual concert program Malenkiy prints (Russian: Маленький принц, lit. 'The Little Prince') in the period from1979 to 1980, after the group's break-up and reformation.

In concert performances from 1982 to 1988, part of the song went into a medley along with old songs such as "Kovo ty khotel udivit" (Russian: «Кого ты хотел удивить», lit. 'Whom did you want to surprise', "Sinyaya ptitsa" (Russian: «Синяя птица», lit. 'Blue bird'), "Skachki" (Russian: «Скачки»), and "Za tekh, kto v more" (Russian: «За тех, кто в море»).

From 1990 to present, the song remains one of the main concert hits and is usually played at the end of shows, along with the song "Svecha" (Russian: «Свеча»).

== Composition ==
In his memoir, "Mashina" s evreyami (Russian: «Машина с евреями», lit. '"Mashina" with Jews'), Pyotr Podgorodetsky wrote that he composed the music for the song "Povorot" in 1976, while serving in the army, in the barracks of the military unit of the Internal Troops of the USSR Ministry of Internal Affairs in the city of Aleksandrovka in Belgorod Oblast, where he guarded prisoners. On April 29, 2008, Podgorodetsky performed the song's initial melody on the Russian television channel Lya-Minor (Russian: «Ля-Минор», lit. 'A-Minor').

According to the official version of events, during work on the Malenkiy prints program, Alexandr Kutikov proposed a melody he had come up with, which Makarevich thought was too lyrical and calm. After this, Kutikov and Pogorodetsky prepared a more aggressive version, for which Makarevich quickly wrote lyrics. However, Pogorodetsky claims that he was the one who proposed the slow and lyrical melody, which Kutikov criticized, after which they tried to play it at a faster tempo. Podgorodetsky's version is confirmed by Aleksey Bogomlov, with supplementary details.

Да, Петя действительно сидел, играл на пианино последовательность аккордов. Но мелодию от первой до последней ноты написал я. Однако посчитал правильным указать Петра как соавтора, хотя мог бы этого и не делать.

—Alexandr Kutikov
Translation:

Yes, Petya really did sit and play a sequence of chords on the piano. But I wrote the melody from the first to last note. However, it was considered the right thing to designate Pyotr as a co-author, although we could have not done so.

== Versions ==
In addition to many amateur concert recordings, "Povorot" was officially included on the following albums:

- 1980: Malenkiy prints (Russian: «Маленький принц», lit. 'The Little Prince') (released in 2000) — live recording featuring Makarevich (guitar, backing vocals), Kutikov (bass, vocals), Podgorodetsky (keyboards, backing vocals), Efremov (percussion)
- 1987: Desyat let spustya (Russian: Десять лет спустя, lit. 'Ten Years Later') — studio recording of old songs by the group, featuring Makarevich (guitar, backing vocals), Kutikov (bass, vocals), Zaitsev (keyboards), Efremov (percussion)
- 1989: the concert film Rok i fortuna (Russian: Рок и фортуна, lit. 'Rock and fortune') concert film — recording from the group's 20th anniversary concert, featuring Pyotr Podgorodetsky (vocals)
- 1993: The Best Songs of Mashina Vremeni 1979-1985 (Russian: «Лучшие песни Машины Времени 1979—1985») — studio remake, featuring Kutikov (bass, vocals), Makarevich (guitar, backing vocals), Efremov (percussion), Podgorodetsky (keyboards, backing vocals), Margulis (guitar, backing vocals)
- 1999: 30 Years of MV (Russian: «ХХХ лет МВ») (released in 2000) — recording from the anniversary concert, featuring Makarevich (guitar, backing vocals), Kutikov (bass, vocals), Margulis (guitar, backing vocals), Podgorodetsky (keyboards, backing vocals), Efremov (percussion)
- 2000: Mashina Vremeni i Voskreseniye: 50 na dvoikh (Russian: «Машина времени и Воскресение. 50 на двоих») (released in 2001) — concert recording featuring Makarevich (guitar, backing vocals), Kutikov (bass, vocals), Margulis (guitar, backing vocals), Derzhavin (keyboards, backing vocals), Efremov (percussion), and the group Voskreseniye
- 2004: Kremlin Rocks! (released in 2005) — concert recording featuring Makarevich (guitar, backing vocals), Kutikov (bass, vocals), Margulis (guitar, backing vocals), Derzhavin (keyboards, backing vocals), Efremov (percussion), and the Chamber Orchestra Kremlin
- 2009: Day 14810 (Russian: «День 14810-й») (released in 2010) — concert recording, from the group's 40th anniversary concert at the Olympic Stadium.
