= Dusha =

- Original film poster
- Directed by: Alexander Stefanovich
- Written by: Alexander Borodyansky; Alexander Stefanovich
- Produced by: Alexander Stefanovich
- Starring: Sofia Rotaru; Rolan Bykov; Mikhail Boyarsky; Vyacheslav Spesivtsev
- Music by: Aleksandr Zatsepin
- Distributed by: Mosfilm
- Release date: 1 January 1981
- Running time: 93 minutes
- Country: Soviet Union
- Language: Russian

Dusha (Russian: Душа, English translation: Soul) is a 1981 Soviet musical drama film written by Alexander Borodyansky and directed by Alexander Stefanovich, starring Sofia Rotaru and Mikhail Boyarsky. The movie features songs performed by Sofia Rotaru, Mikhail Boyarsky and the Russian rock band Mashina Vremeni (Time Machine). The movie has substantial philosophical dialogue about the self-criticism of an artist and the existential approach to the golden mean between artistic creation and respect for human dignity.

The movie featured a musical video, with Rotaru and Boyarsky jumping on a trampoline in gold stretch fabric. Stefanovich claimed it was watched by more than 57 million cinema-goers in the Soviet Union, while the KinoExpert.ru site lists 33.3 million.

During production of the film, Rotaru's son was threatened to be taken hostage and was hidden in a villa in the Crimea. The scenario and the role of Viktoria Slobodina were specially written for Rotaru. The main plot in the movie deals with the singer's health problems (inflammation of the vocal cords), and Rotaru had similar health issues.

The story is set by the sea at Rotaru's house in Yalta and in Germany (where Rotaru at that time recorded many of her albums), as well as at international song festivals, where Rotaru participated as well. Initially, producer and director Stefanovich cast his wife Alla Pugacheva to star in the film. After their breakup, he invited Rotaru.

== Plot ==
Original title in Russian.

Viktoria Svobodina is a young but already well known popular singer in the Soviet Union, living in Moscow. Her popularity reaches the heights whilst the band she is performing with remains in the shadows. At an important live concert the band turns off the sound, but Viktoria keeps singing the song, changing the lyrics to "I will sing till the end". As they leave the concert she stops the car and rips posters of herself off the walls of the concert hall and leaves the band for a solo career.

As her career grows, her producer arranges new concert performances for her. However, something starts going wrong with her voice. Her doctor forbids her to sing for at least three months or else she will lose her voice completely. She decides to take a break and informs her producer, as she has received an invitation to sing at an important state concert. As she had not been informed that the concert would be aired live on major Soviet television channels, she concedes to the request and performs in the Kremlin. She receives a telephone call from an old school friend who invites her to the recording of a new song in duet in Leningrad. She learns that he is playing in a rock band. She visits their rock concerts incognito and considers adopting their musical style. Her producer learns that she is in fact singing, even though he persuaded all her clients to postpone requests for her to perform.

Viktoria finally decides to take a break and leaves for an anonymous vacation at a resort on the seashore. The name of the movie ("Soul") comes from a dialogue which takes place at this point in the movie between Viktoria and an older stranger at this isolated vacation resort, during a stroll on a pier. Viktoria confesses her fears of losing her voice and the stranger comforts her, saying that the songs of a singer live as long as the soul of the singer remains alive. Viktoria asks: "Soul? But where is this soul?". Her producer finally locates her with the news that an important international song competition is going to take place in Germany, and she has been selected to represent her country.

Viktoria leaves the resort immediately with the producer. To go to the competition she needs a new band, and the producer finds her one on the outskirts of Moscow. The role of the band is played by Mashina Vremeni (Time Machine). When Viktoria meets the band she recognizes the main player - her old school friend, although they give no sign of it in front of the producer. Rehearsals begin, and at his point in the film we see a music video featuring Rotaru, Boyarsky and Mashina Vremeni, all dressed in futuristic costumes made of tight shiny stretchy fabric, jumping on the trampoline.

Alexander Stefanovich, "Mosfilm" director, (1976—1980):

The interesting thing about the movie, is that we were filming the first, probably the first in the Soviet Union video clip. We have dressed our artists in golden and silver costumes which were sewn up from up to down. The trampoline was installed underneath, and as they were jumping, we were filming as they were singing in the air, as they were flying. This was an overwhelming scene for viewers - nobody understood how did we manage to make it.

Viktoria leaves with her new band for the international song festival Intermusik in Germany, and begins to fall in love with her old friend. She falls ill during a yacht trip on the North Sea. A doctor present on board detects the reason, and advises her to stop singing immediately. Viktoria asks him to be silent and appears on the stage during the competition, where she wins. The last scene of the movie is ambiguous, as it seems she loses her voice completely after the competition, yet the final chord is the victory at the competition.

== Cast ==
- Sofia Rotaru as the famous singer Viktoria Svobodina. The root of Svobodina is svoboda (Russian: свобода)–"freedom".
- Rolan Bykov as Svetlana's manager Albert Leonidovich Grob (Coffin - eng).
- Mikhail Boyarsky as Vadim Starych, soloist of the band Mashina Vremeni.
- Vyacheslav Spesivtsev as Sergey, boyfriend of Viktoria Svobodina in her first band.
- Ivars Kalniņš as the translator and friend of Viktoria while in Germany.
- Leonid Obolensky as an old man who meets Viktoria at the secluded sea resort and gives her insight into artistic creation.
- Aleksandr Zatsepin as a studio sound operator.
- Mashina Vremeni features its real life members: Valery Efremov, Alexandr Kutikov, Andrey Makarevich, Pyotr Podgorodetsky, and Ovanes Melik-Pashaev.

== Production ==
Sofia Rotaru sings in the movie, but another actress did the voice for the dialogue because of Rotaru's Moldavian accent. In contrast to the role she played in the movie, Sofia Rotaru did not have to leave her singing career; her voice eventually recovered.

- Writers: Alexander Borodyansky, Alexander Stefanovich
- Director: Alexander Stefanovich
- Producer: Alexander Stefanovich
- Cameraman-producer: Vladimir Klimov
- Painter-producer: Alina Speshneva
- Music: Aleksandr Zatsepin, Andrey Makarevich, Alexandr Kutikov
- Sound operator: V. Babushkin, V. Ladyguina
- Producers: V. Kovaleva, M. Maksimchyuk
- Cameramen: V. Kromas, A. Naydyonov
- Costumes: V. Ptitsin
- Cutter: E. Tobak
- Make-up: M. Agafonova
- Trick photography: Cameraman: A. Dvigubsky, Painter: P. Khurumov
- Editor: E. Ermolin
- Music editor: A. Belyaev
- Film director: Georgy Pastushkov

== Soundtrack ==
Songs were composed by Soviet lyricists such as Robert Rozhdestvensky and Igor Kokhanovsky, composers such as Aleksandr Zatsepin, and members of Mashina Vremeni: Andrey Makarevich and Alexandr Kutikov. Scenes in Germany feature the works of Antonio Vivaldi in the background.

| N° | Song | Performed by | Authors | Comments |
|---|---|---|---|---|
| 1 | "My Song" (instrumental version); Russian: Моя песня/Moya pesnya | Sofia Rotaru | ^{Lyrics: Robert Rozhdestvensky; Music: Aleksandr Zatsepin} | First performed in Dusha; not released in an album |
| 2 | "I Live Hoping"; Russian: Живу надеждой/Zhivu nadezhdoy | Sofia Rotaru | ^{Lyrics: Igor Kokhanovsky; Music: Aleksandr Zatsepin} | First performed in Dusha (twice); not released in an album |
| 3 | "The Weather Is Not to Blame"; Russian: Дело не в погоде/Delo ne v pogode | Sofia Rotaru, Mikhail Boyarsky | ^{Lyrics: Igor Kokhanovsky; Music: Aleksandr Zatsepin} | First performed in Dusha; not released in an album |
| 4 | "(The) Right"; Russian: Право/Pravo | Mashina Vremeni | ^{Lyrics: Andrey Makarevich; Music: Andrey Makarevich} | First performed in Dusha; not released in an album |
| 5 | "My Song"; Russian: Моя песня/Moya pesnya | Sofia Rotaru | ^{Lyrics: Robert Rozhdestvensky; Music: Aleksandr Zatsepin} | first performed in Dusha (twice): an instrumental version during the opening titles and an a cappella version as Viktoria's first band turned off the sound during the song "Living With Hope"; not released in an album |
| 6 | "Running Around"; Russian: Бег по кругу/Beg po krugu | Sofia Rotaru | ^{Lyrics: Andrey Makarevich; Music: Andrey Makarevich} | First performed in Dusha; not released in an album |
| 7 | "Who Did You Want to Surprise"; Russian: Кого ты хотел удивить/Kogo ty khotel udivit | Mikhail Boyarsky, Mashina Vremeni | ^{Lyrics: Andrey Makarevich; Music: Andrey Makarevich} | First performed in Dusha; not released in an album |
| 8 | "Barrier"; Russian: Барьер/Baryer | Sofia Rotaru | ^{Lyrics: Andrey Makarevich; Music: Andrey Makarevich} | First performed in Dusha; not released in an album |
| 9 | "(The) Way"; Russian: Путь/Put | Sofia Rotaru | ^{Lyrics: Andrey Makarevich; Music: Andrey Makarevich} | First performed in Dusha; not released in an album |
| 10 | "Fire"; Russian: Костёр/Kostyor | Sofia Rotaru | ^{Lyrics: Andrey Makarevich; Music: Andrey Makarevich} | First performed in Dusha; also exists in studio recording |
| 11 | "For Those Who Are In the Sea"; Russian: За тех, кто в море/Za tekh kto v more | Sofia Rotaru | ^{Lyrics: Andrey Makarevich; Music: Alexander Kutikov} | First performed in Dusha with the refrain: "Ya pyu do dna" (I Drink to the Dregs); not released in an album; also exists in a duet concert version performed by Sofia Rotaru and Mashina Vremeni; played a second time during the closing titles |
| 12 | "Tribute to John Lennon"; Russian: Памяти Джона Леннона/Pamyati Dzhona Lennona | Sofia Rotaru | ^{Lyrics: Andrey Makarevich; Music: Andrey Makarevich} | First performed in Dusha; not released in an album; closing song of the movie |
