= Vladimir Evzerov =

Russian composer

- Born: Vladimir Eduardovich Evzerov; February 19, 1954 (age 72); Cherkasy, USSR
- Occupations: Composer, singer
- Website: evzerov.ru

Vladimir Eduardovich Evzerov (Russian: Владимир Эдуардович Евзеров), born on February 19, 1954, is a Russian music composer, singer. Meritorious Artist of Russia (2004).

== Biography ==
Vladimir Evzerov was born on February 19, 1954, in Cherkasy, Ukrainian SSR, Soviet Union.

As a composer famous was only after meeting with Valery Leontiev, who began to perform his songs. In reperutare Leontiev more than 30 songs of Evzerov. Subsequently, Evzerov songs into the repertoire of artists such as Joseph Kobzon, Sofia Rotaru, Nikolai Baskov, Philip Kirkorov, Nikolai Karachentsov, Lyubov Uspenskaya, Aziza, Vadim Kozachenko, Tamara Gverdtsiteli, Vitas, Efim Shifrin, Ekaterina Shavrina, Nadezda Krigina, Mark Tishman, Turetsky Choir, Soprano10, Irina Dubcova, Eugene Diatlov, Ugine Eugene, Eugene Onegin, Alexander Rublev, Anna Reznikova. In addition, Vladimir Evzerov himself performs his own songs, cooperating with Nikolai Denisov, Nikolai Zinoviev, Igor Kokhanovsky Alikhanov Sergey, Yuri Baladzharovym, Maria Shemyakova, Piotr Kuznetsov and other poets.
