= Start All Over Again (film) =

1985 Soviet drama film directed by Alexander Stefanovich

- Russian: Начни сначала
- Directed by: Alexander Stefanovich
- Written by: Aleksandr Borodyanskiy; Aleksandr Stefanovich
- Starring: Andrey Makarevich; Maryana Polteva; Igor Sklyar; Aleksandra Yakovleva-Aasmäe; Rolan Bykov
- Cinematography: Vladimir Klimov
- Music by: Aleksandr Kutikov; Andrey Makarevich
- Release date: 1985
- Running time: 72 minute
- Country: Soviet Union
- Language: Russian

Start All Over Again (Russian: Начни сначала) is a 1985 Soviet musical drama film directed by Alexander Stefanovich.

== Plot ==
The film tells about the bard Nikolai Kovalev, who, despite his popularity among young people, is not recognized by music officials. But everything changes from an unexpected meeting. A lady who attended one of his performances, starts an undercover campaign to discredit critics and support Nikolai's performances. She gets caught trespassing, and is discovered by police and by Nikolai. He helps her to be released, but is put in difficult choice between creative performances and the alternative of adjusting to meet the expectations of the clients and critics to get more income and job security.

== Cast ==
- Andrey Makarevich
- Maryana Polteva
- Igor Sklyar
- Aleksandra Yakovleva-Aasmäe
- Rolan Bykov
- Svetlana Nemolyaeva
- Alla Mochernyuk
- Dmitri Yuzovsky
- Ivan Agafonov
- Vyacheslav Spesivtsev
