= Konstantin Nikolsky =

Russian musician (born 1951)

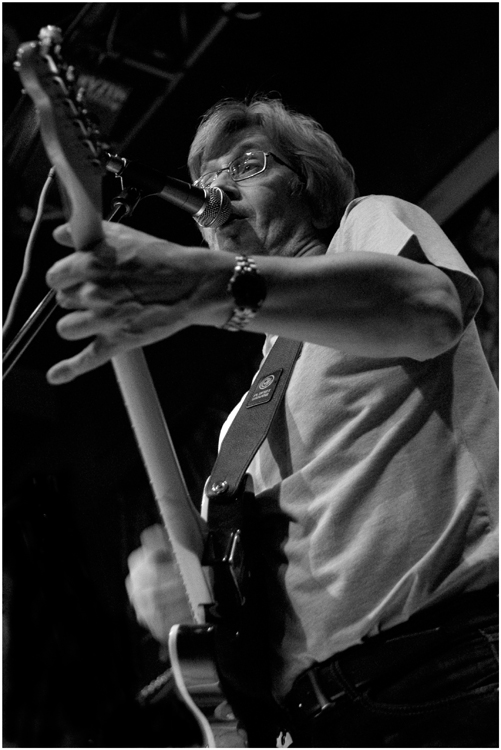
Konstantin Nikolsky in 2007

Konstantin Nikolaevich Nikolsky (Russian: Константин Николаeвич Никольский; born 1 February 1951 in Moscow) is a Russian rock musician, singer, guitarist and songwriter. He has played with many Russian bands, including Voskreseniye and Tsvety.

== Biography ==
He started as an amateur in the late sixties with Moscow band Atlants with Alexander Sikorsky. He worked in official bands during the 1970s, most notably a guitarist for Stas Namin band Tsvety and Festival. Working for Festival he wrote songs for films.

In the summer of 1981 he joined the band Voskreseniye as a songwriter and guitarist. Writing hit songs such as "Nochnaya Ptitsa" ("the Night Bird") and "Zerkalo Mira" ("The Mirror of the World"), the band shot to fame, and these songs became instant classics.

He recorded only one album with Voskreseniye: Voskreseniye 2. It was recorded in a basement of an old office over three days, and is perhaps the most well known album from them.

In 1983 he left Voskreseniye and rejoined Festival.

After finishing the Gnesini school of guitar music in 1984, Nikolsky left Festival and formed his own musical group Zerkalo Mira. The band disbanded three years later, shortly after taking part in the big concert Rock Panorama, playing alongside bands like Bravo and Rondo. They did not record an album.

After the breakup of Zerkalo Mira, Nikolsky was joined by pianist M. Shevtsov and guitarist A. Berezovsky, and he started work on his solo project. He moved toward a calm acoustical style that fits in perfectly with his musical material. In 1990 his band was joined by bass guitarist and friend Alexander Kuzmichev and drummer Igor Kostikov.

Eventually he recorded his first solo album in 1991 and he began touring immediately afterward, playing songs from this album. The band was asked to play live on Russian television shows such as Live Water, Rock-n-roll TV and Program A.

The band's listeners are from a wide spectrum, the young people who can relate to Nikolsky's songs, and the older folks who know Nikolsky from his work with Voskreseniye.

== Discography ==
- 1992 – I wander off-road
- 1994 – A. Romanov, K. Nikolsky. Acoustic concert (Live)
- 1996 – One look back
- 1998 – The best songs
- 2001 – 50. Anniversary concert in the State Central Concert Hall "Russia" (Live)
- 2001 – Musician. The best songs
- 2002 – Starry series
- 2003 – Alive string, acoustic album (Live)
- 2003 – My white birds. Gold Collection
- 2003 – Grand Collection
- 2003 – Legends of Russian rock. Gold Collection
- 2003 – Encyclopedia of Russian rock
- 2004 – I only can dream of my life
- 2004 – The legends of the genre. The best songs. I am myself from those
- 2004 – The Mood for Love
- 2006 – Favorite songs .RU
- 2007 – Illusions
- 2007 – Anthology
- 2009 – Soyuz Gold. Musician
