= Pyotr Podgorodetsky =

Russian musician and showman (born 1957)

- Пётр Подгородецкий
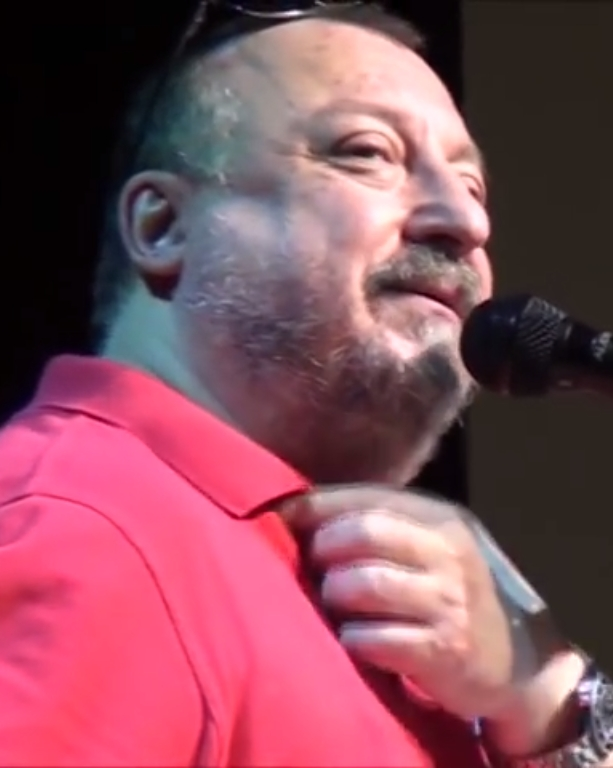
- Podgorodetsky in 2012
- Born: Pyotr Ivanovich Podgorodetsky; 12 February 1957 (age 69); Moscow
- Occupations: musician, composer, singer, showman, TV presenter, writer, poet, radio host, keyboardist
- Known for: Visokosnoe Leto; Mashina Vremeni; Voskreseniye; Kukuruza; X.O.

Pyotr Ivanovich Podgorodetsky (Russian: Пётр Ива́нович Подгороде́цкий; born 12 February 1957) is a Russian musician and showman. He was the keyboardist of the rock band Mashina Vremeni in 1979-1982 and 1990-1999, respectively. He also worked in the group Voskreseniye and led a program on television and radio. At the present time, he is leader of the group X.O.

== Biography ==
Podgorodetsky was born February 12, 1957 into a family of musicians in Moscow. His mother, Victoria Ivanovna Podgorodetskaya, was a singer. His grandmother, Vera Fyodorovna, was a pianist.

In 1976 he graduated from the conducting and choral department at the Music College at the Moscow Conservatory.

== Career ==
In 1978-1979 he held the position of concertmaster at the Polyphonic Drama Theater.

In 1979 he became a member of the "Time Machine" (Russian: «Машина времени») group. He was a keyboardist and vocalist until 1982.

The band has released albums:

- "Songs from the movie Soul" (Russian: «Песни из кинофильма Душа»; 1981)
- "Moscow – Leningrad" (Russian: «Москва – Ленинград»; 1981)
- "Fortune Hunters" (Russian: «Охотники за удачей»; 1982)
- "Slow good music" (Russian: «Медленная хорошая музыка»; 1991)
- "Freelance commander of the Earth" (Russian: «Внештатный командир Земли»; 1993)
- "Unplugged" (1994)
- "Megamix" (1996)
- "Cardboard wings of love" (Russian: «Картонные крылья любви»; 1996)
- "Coming off" (Russian: «Отрываясь»; 1997)
- "The Best" (1998)
- "Clocks and signs" (Russian: «Часы и знаки»; 1999)
- "The Little Prince" (Russian: «Маленький принц»; 2000)
- "XXX years of the "Time Machine"" (Russian: «XXX лет «Машине времени»; 2000)
- "The best songs of the "Time Machine" 1989-2000" (Russian: «Лучшие песни «Машины времени» 1989-2000»; 2001)
- "Unreleased" (Russian: «Неизданное»; 2004)

In 1982-1987 he played in the band "SV" (Russian: «СВ»). He played in the country band "Kukuruza" (Russian: «Кукуруза»).

In 1987-1990 he worked on a personal project: the "Free Flight" (Russian: «Свободный полет») show club.

Записал сольные альбомы:

- "09" (1988)
- "Concert at the Crazy Milk club" (Russian: «Концерт в клубе Crazy Milk»; 2002)
- "Walruses. Kosher songs about the main thing" (Russian: «Моржи. Кошерные песни о главном»; 2005)
- "I'm on my own and with friends" (Russian: «Я сам по себе и с друзьями»; 2006)

In 1990-1999 he took part in the "Time Machine" again.

In 2000 he worked as a DJ in the program "Hooligan show" (Russian: «Хулиган-шоу») on the radio station Silver Rain.

In 2007 the book "The Car with the Jews" (Russian: «Машина с евреями») was published, and in 2009 the book "The Russians are Coming" (Russian: «Русские идут») was published.

== Awards and honours ==
- Honored Artist of the Russian Federation (1999)
- Order of Honour (1999)

== Personal life ==
In 1976 he married Lyubov Yakimova (circus performer). In the 1980s he married Natalia for the second time. From 1985 to 2005 he was married to Svetlana Samoilova, in 1987 they had two twin daughters Anastasia (died of cancer in 2003) and Anna. In 2005 Podhoretsky married architect Irina.
