= Mashina Vremeni =

Russian rock band

Time Machine
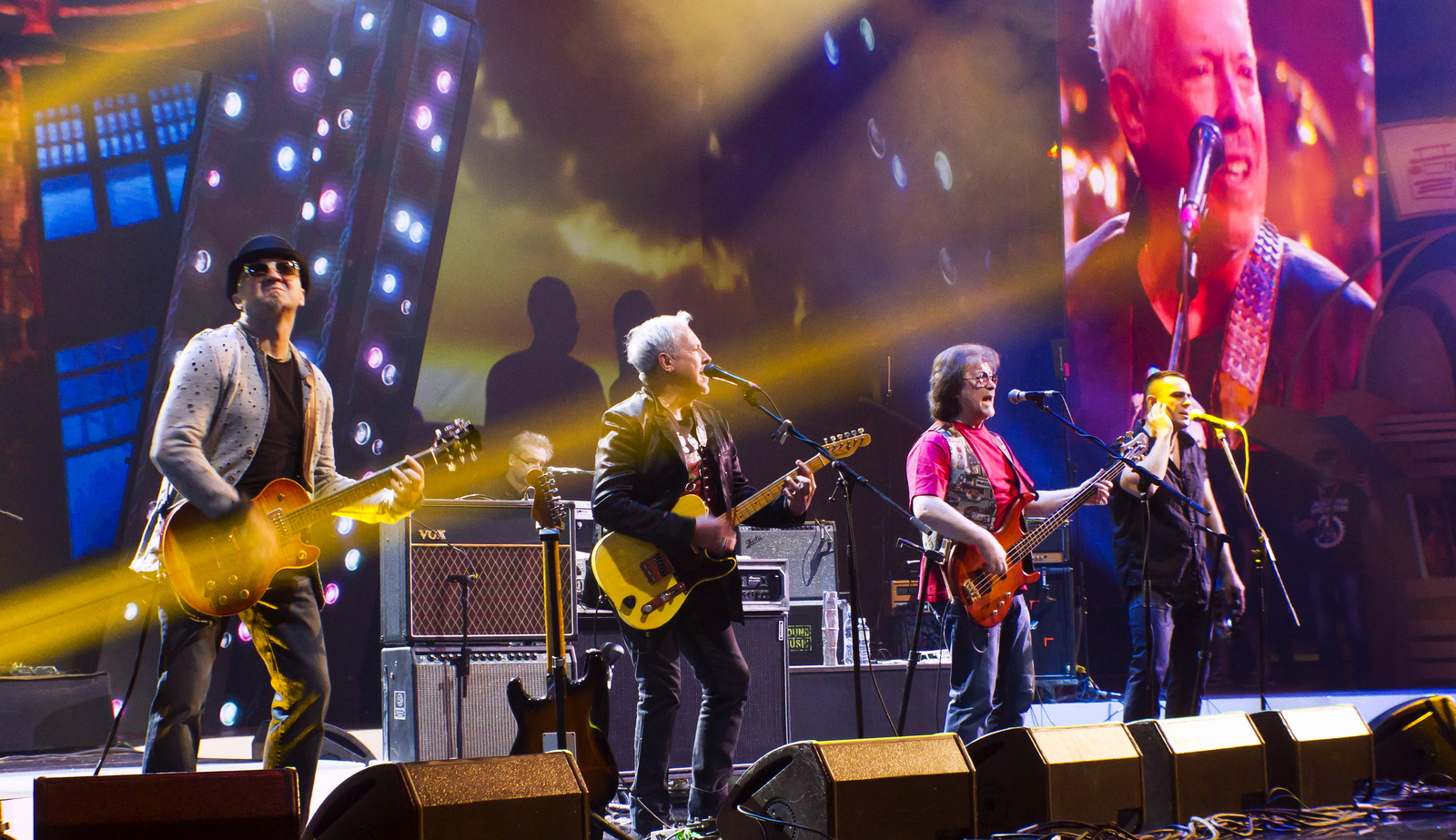
- The band in 2018

Background information
- Origin: Moscow, Russian SFSR, Soviet Union
- Genres: Blues rock, Rock and roll, Progressive rock (early years)
- Years active: 1969–present
- Members: Andrey Makarevich; Alexander Kutikov; Valeriy Efremov
- Past members: Evgeny Margulis; Sergey Kawagoe †; Pyotr Podgorodetsky; Alexander Zaicev †; Sergey Ryzhenko; Yuri Borzov †; Maxim Kapitanovsky †; Yuri Fokin; Andrey Derzhavin; Sergey Ostroumov †; Alexander Ditkovsky
- Website: www.mashina.ru

Mashina Vremeni (Russian: Машина времени, lit. 'Time Machine') is a Russian rock band founded in 1969. Mashina Vremeni was a pioneer of Soviet rock music and remains one of the oldest still-active rock bands in Russia. The band's music incorporates elements of classic rock, blues, and bard's song. Mashina Vremeni's best known members are Andrey Makarevich (founder, principal singer-songwriter, public face of the band), Alexander Kutikov (bass player and producer/sound engineer), and Evgeny Margulis (guitarist/songwriter).

== History ==
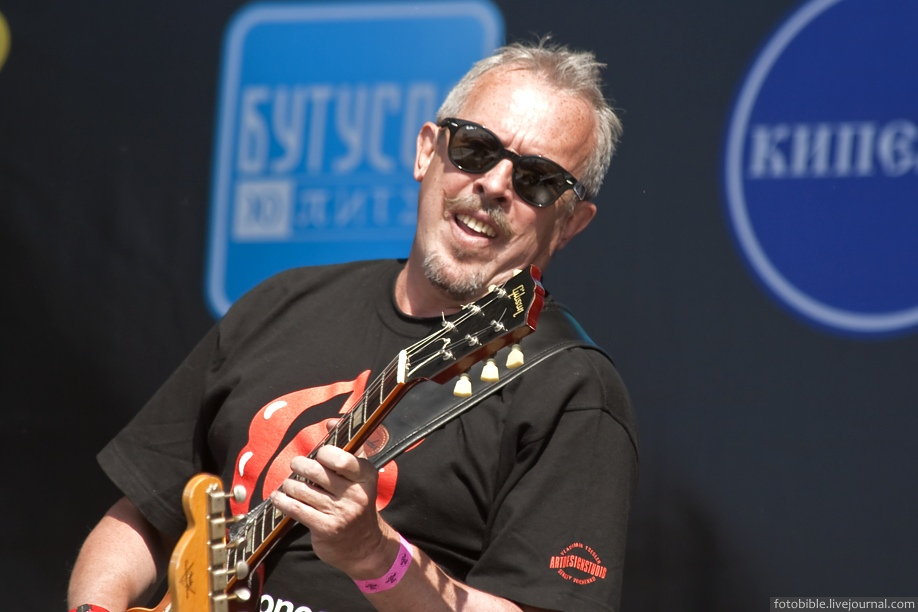
Andrey Makarevich

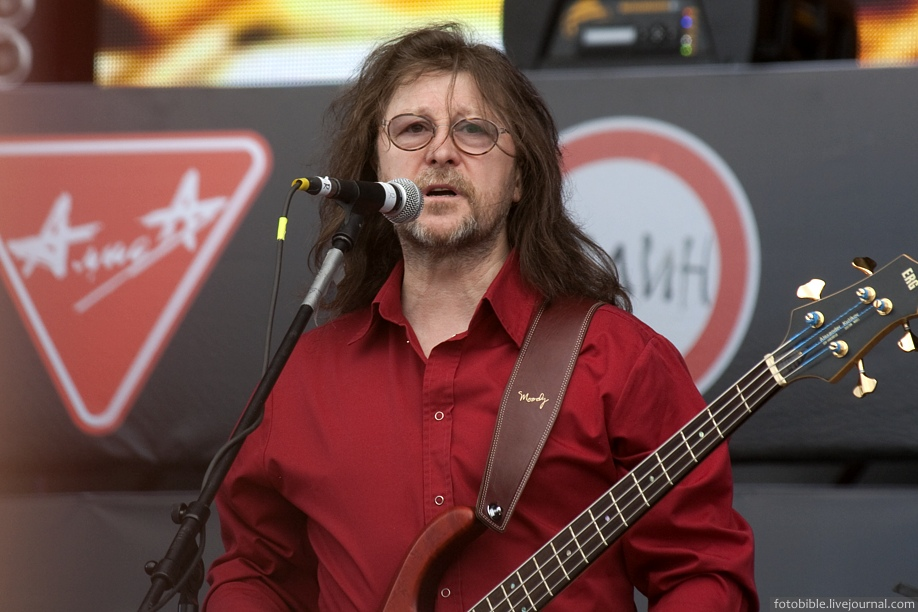
Alexander Kutikov

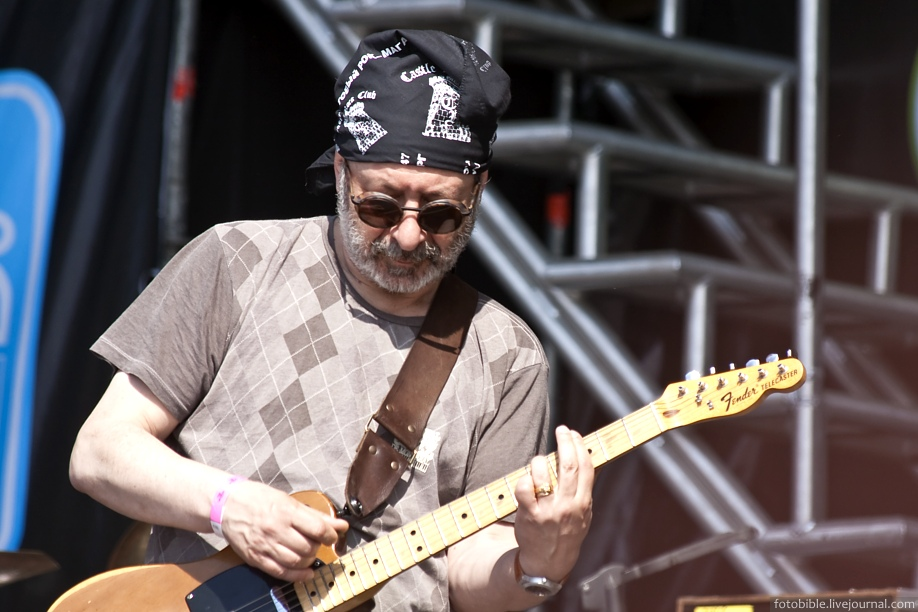
Evgeny Margulis

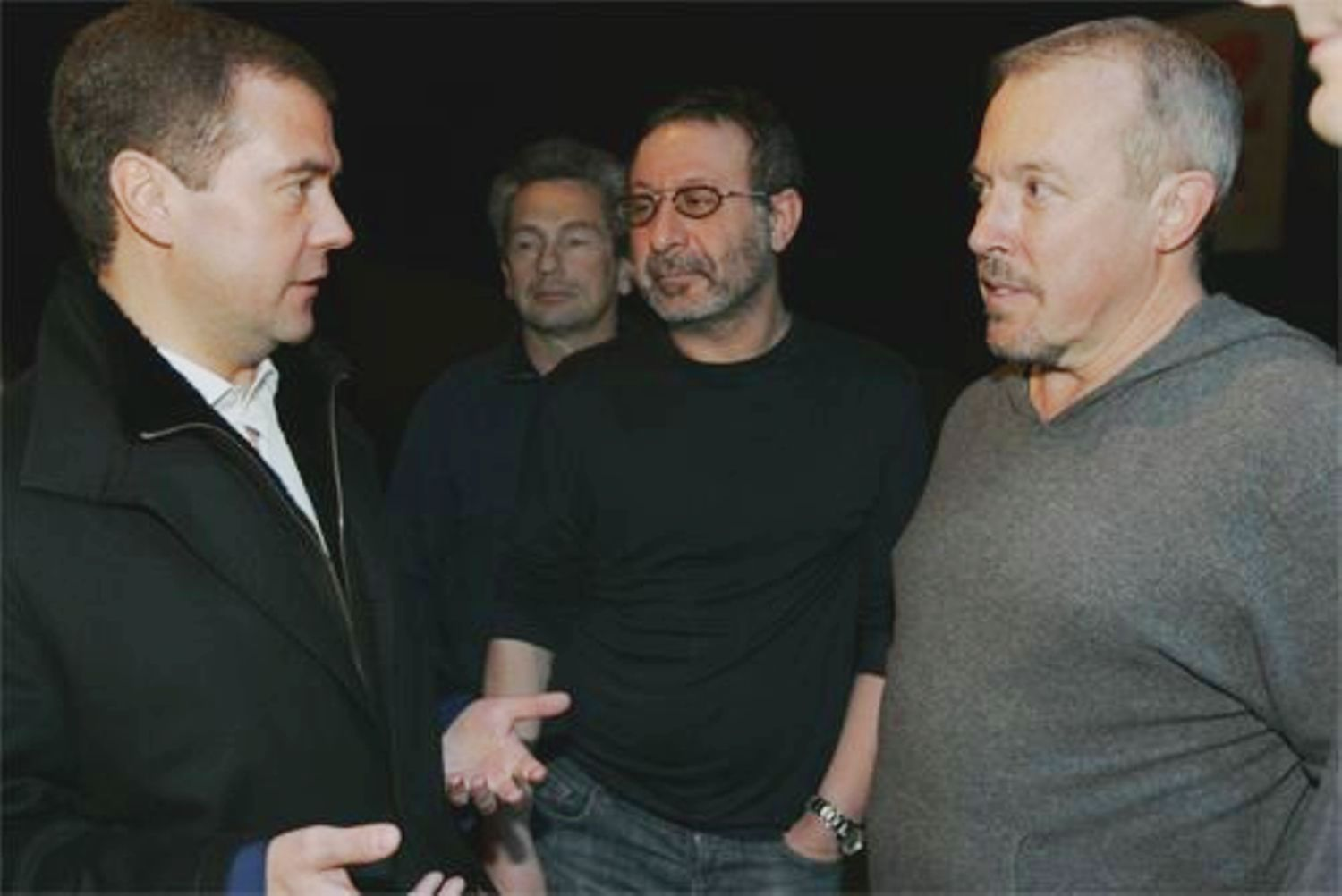
Mashina Vremeni meet Russian president Dmitry Medvedev in 2008. L-R: Medvedev, Yefremov, Margulis, Makarevich

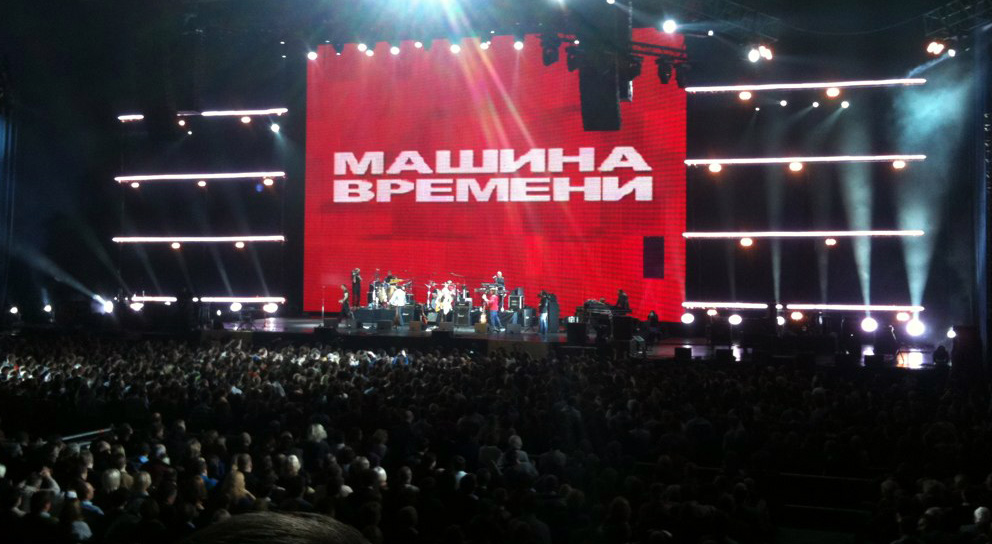
Mashina Vremeni performing at the band's 40th anniversary concert

Andrey Makarevich's musical career can be traced to a school band called The Kids, which was made up of two male guitarists and two female vocalists. The group sang mostly English-language folk songs and performed primarily at talent shows put on in Moscow schools. According to Makarevich, the momentous event in his musical career came when the Soviet group VIA Atlanty (Russian: ВИА «Атланты») visited his school and allowed him to play a couple of songs on their equipment during a break in the performance. On the heels of this experience, Makarevich in 1969 joined with other musically talented students from his school and another school to form Mashiny Vremeni (Russian: Машины времени, lit. 'Time Machines' – in plural form imitating The Beatles, The Rolling Stones, etc.). The most significant founding members included Sergey Kawagoe and Andrey Makarevich. The band's repertoire consisted of eleven songs in English, now lost.

Mashina Vremeni started playing during the first years of the Brezhnev era, but could not get official bookings as a professional band. In 1979 Makarevich signed the band up with Rosconcert, becoming more or less legitimate in the State music system (although they couldn't play in Moscow).

=== Timeline ===
- 1971 – Alexander Kutikov becomes the bass player, introducing more of buoyant rock-n-roll into the band's material
- 1972 – Line-up losses in the band as several members are drafted into service (which to this day is compulsory in Russia)
- 1973 – Tensions between Sergey Kawagoe and Alexander Kutikov; the latter leaves the band for a hard rock outfit Visokosnoe Leto (Leap Year Summer)
- 1974 – Sergey Kawagoe leaves, Alexander Kutikov returns. However, Kawagoe also returns after about six months. The band performs with the following line-up: Andrey Makarevich, Alexander Kutikov, Sergey Kawagoe, and Alexey Romanov (future leader of another prominent Russian band Voskreseniye ("Resurrection" or "Sunday"))
- 1975 – Romanov and Kutikov suddenly depart. Evgeny Margulis joins on guitar
- 1978 – First studio record of Mashina Vremeni. Alexander Kutikov, though playing in Visokosnoe Leto, helps his friends as a producer and sound engineer.
- 1979 – Band in crisis. Sergey Kawagoe and Evgeny Margulis leave the band and start Voskresenie. At this time, Andrey Makarevich writes one of the band's most enduring and popular songs: "Poka gorit svecha" ("As long as the candle burns"), as a statement of his not giving up. After some time of frustration, Alexander Kutikov saves the situation by leaving the Visokosnoe Leto band and bringing Valeriy Efremov (also from Visokosnoe Leto) as drummer and Pyotr Podgorodetsky on the keyboards.
- 1981 – The song "Povorot" (Russian: Поворот, lit. 'The Turning Point') stays on the top of charts for 18 months. The band composes the soundtrack to the popular movie Dusha, starring Sofia Rotaru watched by more than 57 million cinema-goers in the Soviet Union.
- 1982 – Repressions begin in earnest with a denouncing article "'Blue Bird' ragout" ("Blue Bird" was a popular song of the band) which describes the band's output as depressive and ideologically unsound. A nationwide wave of protest against the denunciation sends thousands of fan letters to newspaper editors. Pyotr Podgorodetsky leaves; Alexandr Zaitsev replaces him.
- 1986 – A compilation V dobriy chas ("Good Luck") becomes the first official group's LP.
- 1987 – Reki i Mosty ("Rivers and Bridges") album recorded. It is considered Mashina Vremeni's first official album (all the previous ones were recorded illegally, for underground distribution). First appearances on the television. The band performs at Live Aid 2 festival in Japan.
- 1988 – First international tours – USA, Canada, Greece, Spain and Bulgaria.
- 1989 – V kruge sveta ("In the circle of light") album is released.
- 1990 – Alexandr Zaitsev leaves and Evgeny Margulis and Pyotr Podgorodetsky join the band once again.
- 1991 – Medlennaya khoroshaya muzyka ("Slow good music") album is released.
- 1993 – Alexander Kutikov's company "Sintez Records" releases retro albums Best songs 1979–1985 and That was so long ago (a first 1978 recording). Album Vneshtatniy komandir Zemli ("Part-time commander of the Earth") is released.
- 1994 – Acoustic live album Unplugged is recorded and released. 25th anniversary is celebrated in a 7-hour concert on the Red Square featuring Chaif, Nautilus Pompilius, Garik Sukachov and Bravo.
- 1995 – Compilation of old unpublished songs is released. This compilation is known as Kovo ty hotiel udivit? ("Whom did you expect to surprise?"), after one of Alexander Kutikov's most acclaimed songs.
- 1996 – Kartonniye krylia lubvi ("Cardboard wings of love") album is released.
- 1997 – Otryvayas ("Breaking away") album is released.
- 1999 – The 30th anniversary of the band. A huge world tour finishes with a massive concert, usually considered to be one of the band's best ever, takes place in the main stadium of "sport-complex Olympiyskiy" im Moscow. Chasy i znaki ("Clocks and signs") album is released. Petr Podgorodetskiy is fired due to tensions. Andrey Derzhavin, formerly a solo artist, takes his place on the keyboards.
- 2001 – Mesto gde svet ("The place where there's light") album is released.
- 2004 – 35th anniversary of the band. A concert featuring 35 selected songs is played at the Red Square. Mashinalno ("Mechanically") album is released.
- 2005 – Live album Kremlin rocks is released.
- 2006 – Sintez Records releases a compilation called Mashina vremeni – chast' 1 ("Time Machine – Part 1"). The band records a new album (which is called in English Time machine) at famous Studio 2 at Abbey Road Studios.
- 2007 – The group releases the Time machine album.
- 2009 - A 40-years anniversary is celebrated with an album Mashiny ne parkovat (Parking Forbidden) and a tribute album Mashinopis (The Typescript)
- 2010 – The band continues to celebrate its 40th anniversary with a seven-stop North American tour
- 2012 – Evgenii Margulis leaves the band. An experienced session guitarist Igor' Khomich joins as a guest musician.
- 2014 - Andrey Makarevich, group's leader, becomes the first Russian rock musician who expresses support to Ukraine in the beginning of Russian military intervention in Crimea. He is bullied in official media, and all Mashina's gigs in Russia outside Moscow are forbidden until 2017.
- 2016 - an album Vy (You) comes in with a cover made of fans's selfies (which was a Kutikov's idea)
- 2017 - Andrey Derzhavin leaves the band to return to solo career, and a guest keyboardist Alexander Lyovochkin steps in.
- 2019 - Percussionist Sergey Ostroumov suddenly dies a few days before 50-years show in Otkrytie Arena Stadium in Moscow, Kirill Ipatov takes the place
- 2020 - during the COVID-19 pandemia time, an album V metre (In The Meter) is written, recorded and released
- 2022 - when Russia invaded Ukraine, all the group's shows were once again prohibited, and musicians were forced to leave Russia.
- 2023 - the group resumes playing live all over the world, excluding Russia and Belarus.
- 2024-2025 - an EP Poi so mnoi! (Sing With Me!) is written in Israel and Latvia, then recorded in Israel and published worldwide. Trumpeter Alexander Ditkovsky leaves. The group keeps touring.

== Musical style ==
Mashina Vremeni's sound is eclectic and incorporates multiple different genres. Contributions to song composition have been made by almost every band member, and often reflect each member's particular stylistic preferences. Makarevich is a fan of The Beatles, and many of his songs reflect the Beatles' influence. He is also influenced by blues music and Soviet singer-songwriters, the so-called "bards". Kutikov is a quintessential rocker, he composes guitar-oriented hard rock. Margulis is one of the Russia's best known bluesmen, and his songs are usually blues rock ballads.

The majority of the band's lyrics are written by Makarevich.

== Albums ==
Year	Russian	Translit	English	Notes
1978	Это было так давно	Eto bylo tak davno	It was so long ago	Self-released tape album. Released by an official label only in 1992
1979	Маленький принц	Malenkiy printz	The Little Prince	live album with inter-song quotations from the Antoine de Saint-Exupéry book
1986	В добрый час	V dobriy chas	Good luck	Compilation of songs written in 1980–1985
1987	Реки и мосты	Reki i mosty	Rivers and bridges	
1989	В круге света	V kruge sveta	In a circle of light	
1991	Медленная хорошая музыка	Medlennaya khoroshaya muzyka	Slow good music	
1993	Внештатный командиръ Земли	Vneshtatniy komandir Zemli	Freelance Commander of Earth	
1994	Кого ты хотел удивить?	Kogo ty khotel udivit	Whom did you want to surprise? (Who did you expect to impress)	Unpublished song compilation
1994		Unplugged		Live acoustic album
1996		Megamix		Electronic remixes of selected songs
1996	Картонные крылья любви	Kartonniye kryliya lubvi	Cardboard wings of love	
1996	Неизданное	Neizdannoe	Unpublished	Rare songs from the early 70s
1997	Отрываясь	Otryvayas	Breaking away	
1999	ХХХ лет МВ	30 years of Mashina Vremeni	XXX anniversary concert	Live album
1999	Часы и Знаки	Chasy i znaki	Clocks and signs	
2000	50 на двоих	50 na dvoikh	50 for two	Joint concert of Mashina Vremeni and Voskreseniye
2001	Место где свет	Mesto gde svet	A lighted place	
2004	Машинально	Mashinalno	Mechanically	
2005		Kremlin Rocks!		A concert of Mashina Vremeni with the Kremlin chamber orchestra
2007		Time machine		
2009	Машины не парковать	Mashiny ne parkovat	Do not park the cars (Parking forbidden)	
2016	Вы	Vy	You	
2020	В метре	V metre	In The Meter	
2024	Чужие среди чужих (recorded in 1984)		https://www.deezer.com/uk/album/587162062	
2025	EP Пой со мной!	Poi so mnoi!	Sing With Me!	

== Line-up ==
=== Current line-up ===
- Andrey Makarevich — lead vocals, guitar (1969–present)
- Alexander Kutikov — bass guitar, vocals (1971–1975, 1979–present)
- Valeriy Efremov — drums, percussion (1979–present)

=== Touring musicians ===
- Igor Khomich — guitar (regular on studio and live performances since 2012)
- Alexander Lyovochkin — keyboards, backing vocals (regular on studio and live performances since 2017)
- Kirill Ipatov — percussion (regular on live performances since 2019)

=== Former members ===
- Sergey Kawagoe — bass guitar (1969–1971), keyboards (1971–1975), drums (1975–1979) †
- Evgeny Margulis — guitar, bass guitar, vocals (1975–1979, 1990–2012)
- Pyotr Podgorodetsky — keyboards, vocals (1979–1982, 1990–1999)
- Alexander Zaicev — keyboards (1982–1990) †
- Sergey Ryzhenko — violin, recorder, acoustic guitar (1982–1983)
- Yuri Borzov — drums (1969–1971) †
- Maxim Kapitanovsky — drums (1971–1973) †
- Yuri Fokin — drums (1973–1975)
- Andrei Derzhavin — keyboards, vocals (2000–2017)
- Sergey Ostroumov — percussions (regular on studio and live performances, 2004–2019) †
- Alexandr Ditkovsky — trumpet, tambourine, backing vocals (regular on studio and live performances, 2004-2025)

== Involvement in public debate ==
During the Russo-Ukrainian War frontman Andrey Makarevich denounced Russian military intervention in Crimea and eastern Ukraine. Other people associated with the band kept a low profile in the matter through 2014, but in 2015 it became known that at least Kutikov was against Russian policy in Ukraine, while Derzhavin and director/manager Vladimir Sapunov sided with President Vladimir Putin's policies.
