= Alexander Stefanovich =

Russian film director, producer, and screenwriter (1944–2021)

- Александр Стефанович
- Born: 13 December 1944; Leningrad, Russian SFSR, Soviet Union
- Died: 13 July 2021 (aged 76); Moscow, Russia
- Years active: 1967–2021
- Spouses: Natalya Bogunova (m. 1968; div. 1974); Alla Pugacheva (m. 1976; div. 1980)

Alexander Borisovich Stefanovich (Russian: Алекса́ндр Бори́сович Стефа́нович; 13 December 1944 – 13 July 2021) was a Russian film director, producer, and screenwriter. Cavalier of Order of Friendship.

== Biography ==
Was born in Leningrad on 13 December 1944. He graduated from the directing department of VGIK (workshop of Lev Kuleshov) in 1969. He died from COVID-19 complications on 13 July 2021, at the age of 76.

== Filmography ==
- Residence (1972)
- Dear Boy (1974)
- Foam (1979)
- Dusha (1981)
- Start All Over Again (1985)
- Bard's (1988)
- Autumn Blues (2001)
- Time of Cruel (2004)
- The Notre Dame de Paris Mosque (2011)
- Courage (2014)
