= Evgeny Margulis =

Russian rock and blues musician (born 1955)

Evgeny Margulis Евгений Маргулис
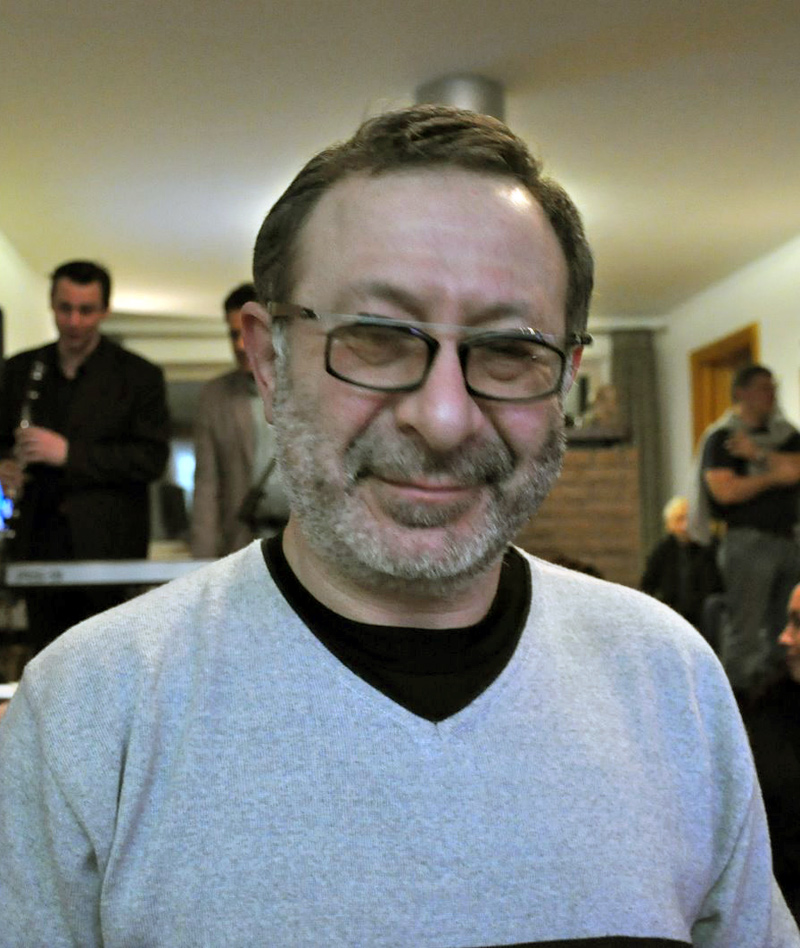
- in 2009

Background information
- Born: Evgeny Shulimovich Margulis; 25 December 1955 (age 70)
- Origin: Moscow, Soviet Union
- Genres: Rock, blues rock, blues
- Occupations: Musician, singer-songwriter, record producer
- Years active: 1975–present
- Website: margulis.ru

Evgeny Shulimovich Margulis (Russian: Евге́ний Шу́лимович Маргу́лис; (born 25 December 1955) is a Russian rock and blues musician. He was a member of the bands Mashina Vremeni (1975–1979, 1990–2012) and Voskreseniye (1979–1980, 1994–2003), but currently performs independently.

== Personal life ==
Margulis is married to Anna Margulis, a ceramic artist. Their son, Daniil, appeared in The House of the Sun.

== Discography ==
=== Solo ===
Year	Russian	Translit	English (where needed)	Notes
1998		7+1		
2001	Евгений Маргулис (альбом)	Evgeny Margulis (album)		
2002		Best		
2004	45 лет	45 let	45 years	Concert album
2007	Продолжение следует	Prodolzhenie Sleduet	To be continued	
2013	Маргулис (альбом)	Margulis (album)		

=== with Mashina Vremeni ===
Year	Russian	Translit	English	Notes
1978	Это было так давно	Eto bylo tak davno	It was so long ago	Self-released tape album. Released by an official label only in 1990
1991	Медленная хорошая музыка	Medlennaya khoroshaya muzyka	Slow good music	
1993	Внештатный командиръ Земли	Vneshtatniy komandir Zemli	Part-time commander of Earth	
1994		Unplugged		Live acoustic album
1996	Картонные крылья любви	Kartonniye kryliya lubvi	Cardboard wings of love	
1996	Неизданное	Neizdannoe	Unpublished	Rare songs from the early 70s
1997	Отрываясь	Otryvayas	Breaking away	
1999	ХХХ лет МВ	30 years of Mashina Vremeni	XXX anniversary concert	Live album
1999	Часы и Знаки	Chasy i znaki	Clocks and signs	
2000	50 на двоих	50 na dvoikh	50 for two	Joint concert of Mashina Vremeni and Voskresenie
2001	Место где свет	Mesto gde svet	A lighted place	
2004	Машинально	Mashinalno	Mechanically	
2005		Kremlin Rocks!		A concert of Mashina Vremeni with the Kremlin chamber orchestra
2007		Time machine		
2009	Машины не парковать	Mashiny ne parkovat	Do not park the cars (Parking forbidden)	

=== with Voskreseniye ===
- Voskreseniye 1 (1979–1980)
- Mi Vas Lubim (Live) (1995)
- Jiveye Vseh Jivih (Live) (1995)
- Legends of Russian Rock vol 1 (1996)
- Jivaro Kolektsia (Live) (1998)
- 50 Na Dvoih (A concert with Mashina Vremeni) (2001)
- All again (Re-recorded old songs) (2001)
- Legends of Russian Rock vol 2 (2002)
- Voskreseniye 79 (Remastered) (2002)
- Without hurry (2003)

=== with Shanghai ===
- Shanghai (album) (1989)
- Do svidaniya, drug! (1995)

=== with Romario and Sergey Chigrakov ===
- Imena (2010)

=== Film music ===
- Potselui padshih angelov (2007)
