= Alexandr Kutikov =

Russian musician and composer (born 1952)

Alexander Kutikov
- Александр Кутиков
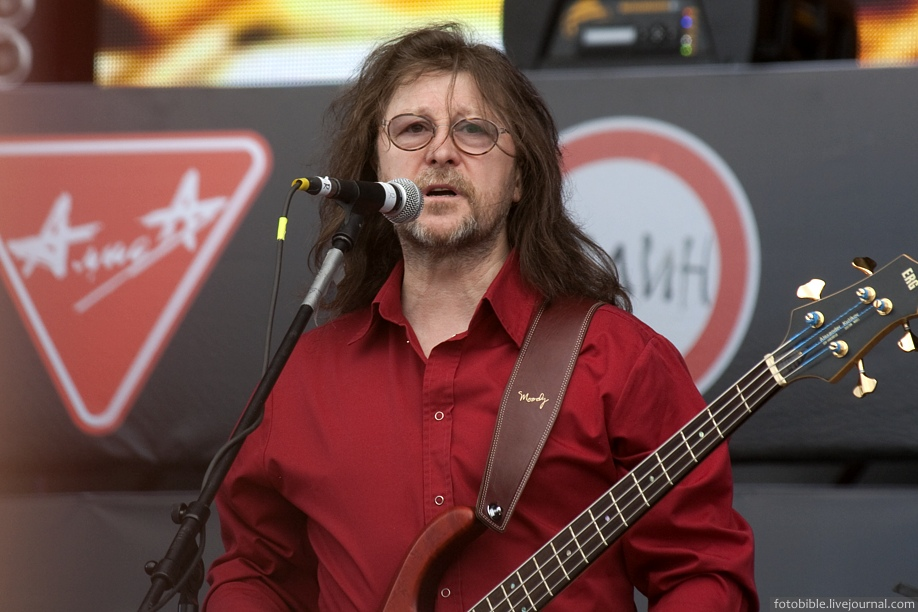
- Kutikov in 2010
- Born: 13 April 1952 (age 74); Moscow
- Occupations: Musician and businessman
- Known for: Mashina Vremeni

Alexander Viktorovich Kutikov (Russian: Александр Викторович Кутиков; 13 April 1952 in Moscow) is a Soviet/Russian rock musician, composer, producer, and businessman.

== Biography ==
Kutikov was born in a Russian-Jewish family in Patriarshiye Ponds, Moscow. He was a fan of groups such as The Beatles during his secondary school years. He later became the bass-guitarist and one of the singers of the Soviet rock band Mashina Vremeni, from 1971 to 1976, and then from to 1979 to the present. The band became famous in the USSR and in Eastern Europe for composing the soundtrack of Dusha (Soul), released in 1981. Kutikov is also the founding president of the sound recording company Sintez Records.

Kutikov wrote the music and performed the vocals for the song "Povorot" by Mashina Vremeni.

== Awards ==
- Order of Honour (June 24, 1999)
- Merited Artist of the Russian Federation (November 22, 1999)
- Honorary Prize of RAO and WIPO (2009)
