= Voskreseniye =

Russian rock band

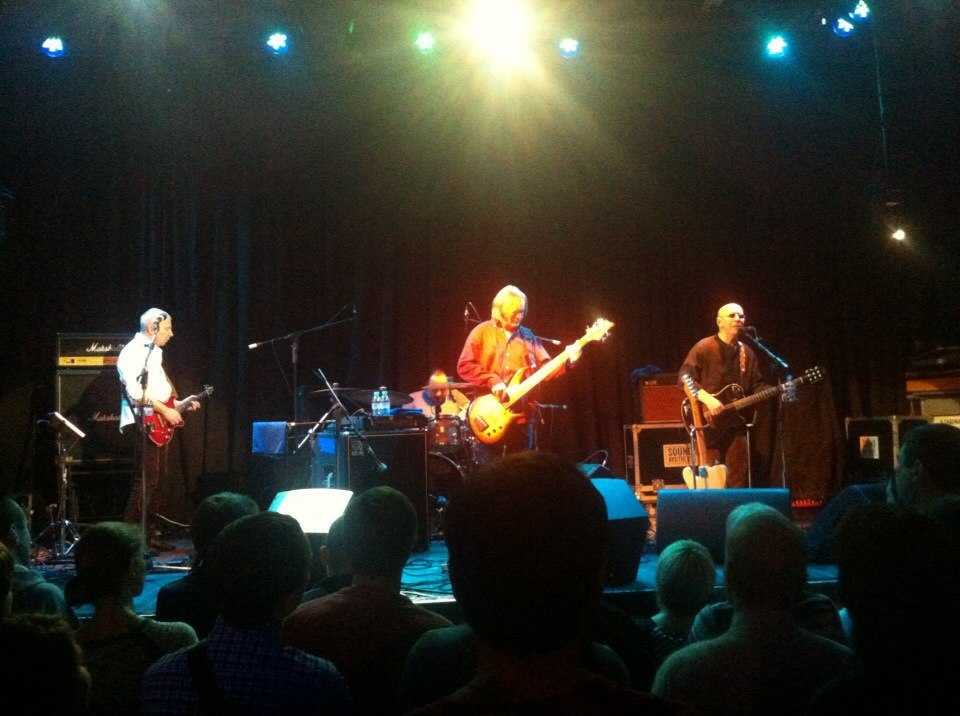

Background information
- Origin: Moscow, Russian SFSR
- Genres: Russian rock
- Years active: 1979–1982, 1994–present
- Members: Alexey Romanov; Alexey Korobkov; Yuri Smolyakov; Sergey Timofeev
- Website: Voskresenie Official site

Voskreseniye (Russian: Воскресение) is a Russian rock band.

== History ==
The band was formed in 1979, when drummer Sergey Kavagoe decided to leave Mashina Vremeni and form his own group. Kavagoe was joined by Mashina Vremeni's bassist, Evgeny Margulis. Alexey Romanov became the group's leader and songwriter, and Alexey Makarevich joined as guitarist. During this period the band released the successful albums Voskreseniye 1 (Russian: Воскресение 1) and Voskreseniye 2 (Russian: Воскресение 2). In 1980, Margulis left the group, after being invited to join the group Araks, and Konstantin Nikolsky, Andrey Sapunov, and Mikhail Shevyakov joined the line-up. In August 1982, Romanov and the group's sound engineer, Alexander Arutyunov, were arrested and charged with private entrepreneurial activity.

Romanov, Sapunov, Nikolsky, and Shevyakov reunited in 1989 to play at the Druzhba arena in a concert celebrating the group's tenth anniversary. The group officially reformed in 1994, performing on March 12 with a line-up of Romanov, Sapunov, Nikolsky, and Shevyakov, with Nikolsky serving as the group's leader. Nikolsky left the group shortly afterwards, due to creative differences, and Romanov asked Margulis to rejoin. Voskreseniye performed its first concert with this new line-up in St. Petersburg on May 1, sharing the bill with Cruise. In 2001, they released a new album, called Vse Snachala (Russian: Всё сначала, lit. 'All over again'), which contained re-recordings of old songs. In 2003, the band released a new album with new songs called Ne Toropyas (Russian: Не торопясь).

== Members ==
=== Current members ===
- Alexey Romanov – lead vocals, guitar (1979–1982, 1994–present)
- Alexey Korobkov – drums (2003–present)
- Yuri Smolyakov – keyboards, backing vocals (2016–present)
- Sergey Timofeev – bass (2017–present)

=== Former members ===
- Andrey Sapunov – vocals, guitar, bass (1979–1982, 1994–2016, died 2020)
- Evgeny Margulis – vocals, bass, guitar (1979, 1980, 1994–2003)
- Alexey Makarevich – guitar (1979–1980, 1994; died 2014)
- Sergey Kawagoe – drums, keyboards (1979–1980; died 2008)
- Sergey Kuzminok – trumpet (1980)
- Pavel Smeyan – saxophone (1980; died 2009)
- Alik Mikoyan – guitar (1980)
- Konstantin Nikolsky – vocals, guitar (1980–1982, 1994)
- Mikhail Shevyakov – drums (1980–1982, 1994–2003)
- Dmitry Leontiev – bass (2008–2017)

== Discography ==
=== Studio albums ===
- 1979-1980 – Voskreseniye 1 (Russian: Воскресение 1)
- 1981 – Voskreseniye 2 (Russian: Воскресение 2)
- 2001 – Vse Snachala (Russian: Всё сначала, lit. 'All over again')
- 2003 – Ne Toropyas (Russian: Не торопясь)

=== Live albums ===
- 1989 – Anniversary Concert "10 Years of Voskreseniye" (Russian: Юбилейный концерт «10 лет группе „Воскресение“»)
- 1994 – Concert. DK Mekhtekh (Russian: Концерт. ДК Мехтех) (recording of 1982 show)
- 1995 – My vas lyubim (Russian: Мы вас любим, lit. 'We Love You') (recording of June 16, 1994 show)
- 1995 – Zhiveye vsekh zhivykh (Russian: Живее всех живых) (recording of March 28, 1995 show)
- 1998 – Zhivaya kollektsiya (Russian: Живая коллекция) (recording of television concert)
- 2000 – 50 na dvoikh (Russian: 50 на двоих) (recording of joint concert with Mashina Vremeni in Moscow's Olympic Stadium)
- 2003 – Ne Toropyas Live (Russian: Не торопясь Live)
- 2005 – Posmotri, kak ya zhivu (Russian: Посмотри, как я живу, lit. 'Watch, how I live')
- 2005 – Ya privyk brodit' odin (Russian: Я привык бродить один)

=== Compilations ===
- 1996 – Legends of Russian Rock vol 1
- 2002 – Legends of Russian Rock vol 2
- 2005 – Grand Collection
- 2009 –The Best
- 2010 –The Best songs
