= Igor Kokhanovsky =

Soviet-Russian songwriter & poet (born 1937)

Igor Vasilyevich Kokhanovsky
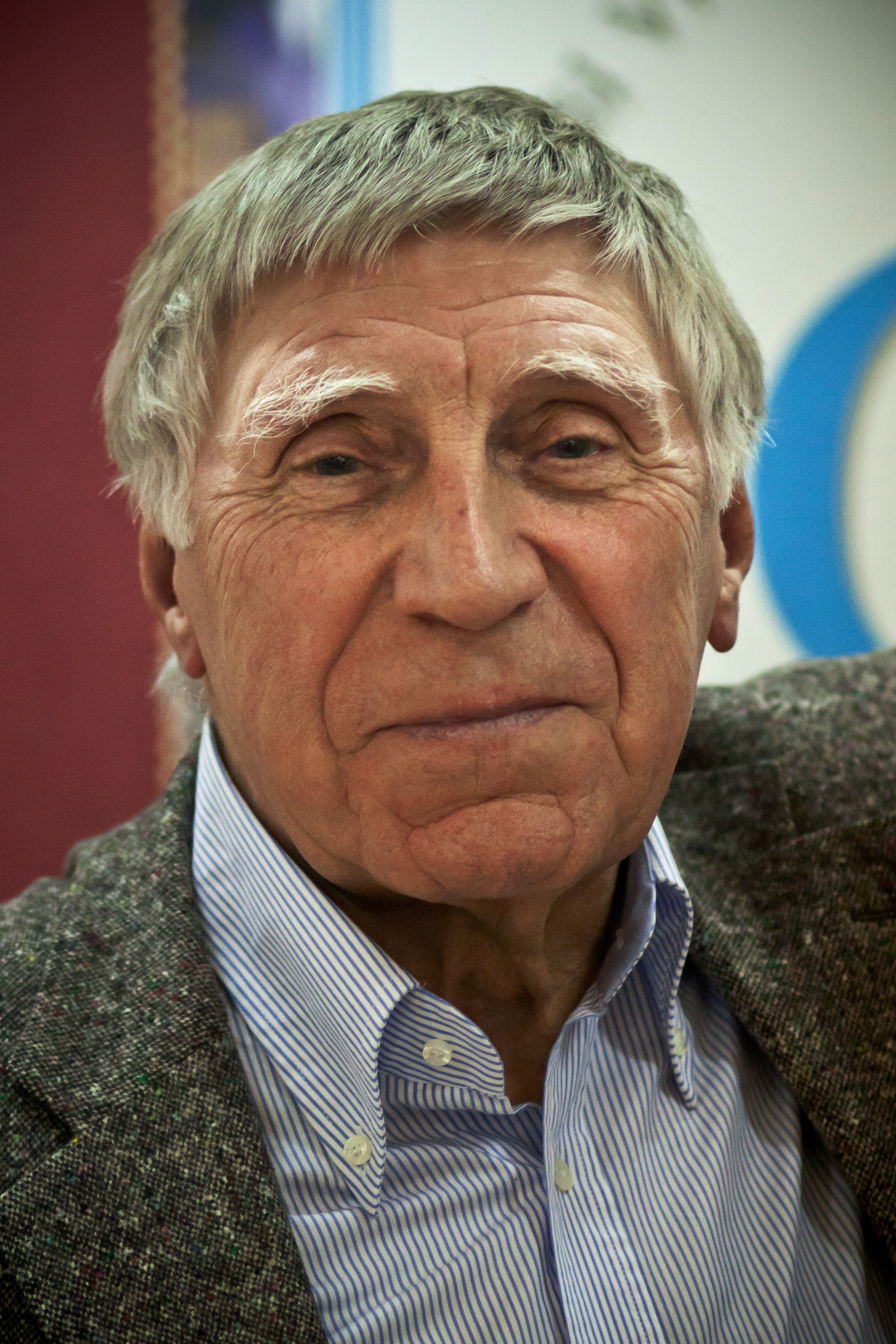
- Born: Игорь Васильевич Кохано́вский; 2 April 1937 (age 89); Moscow, USSR
- Occupations: singer-songwriter, poet, writer
- Years active: 1964-present

Igor Vasilyevich Kokhanovsky (Russian: Игорь Васильевич Кохано́вский, born 2 April 1937 in Moscow, USSR) is a Soviet, Russian bard, poet and lyricist whose songs recorded, among others, Anna German, Sofia Rotaru, Klavdiya Shulzhenko, Lyudmila Zykina and Vladimir Vysotsky, his classmate and friend.

== Biography ==
Igor Kokhanovsky was born in Moscow and attended the same school (from 1952, the same class) as Vladimir Vysotsky. The two developed common passion for literature and poetry, became close friends and exerted considerable influence one upon another.

Igor was the first to start writing poetry and play guitar; it was he who taught Vladimir some chords. But it was Vysotsky who first came up with his own songs. "'Semyonych, what's that?' - I asked, as he sang some. – 'My own, I started to write such pieces.' - Out of sheer envy I wrote Indian Summer, a song dedicated to Lena Kopeleva (Lev Kopelev’s daughter), a girl whom I was in love with at the time. This song served for a while a hymn for our company," Kokhanovsky reminisced later.

The duo enrolled in the Moscow Institute of Civil Engineering but, unlike his friend, who dropped after a year, Kokhanovsky graduated and for a year worked at a construction site in Moscow Oblast. In 1964 he moved to Magadan to work there as a correspondent for Magadansky Komsomolets newspaper (1965-1968), as well as a gold prospector in Chukotka. This move, considered highly unusual in the times when the Russian Far East associated for many with the GULAG, inspired "My Friend Has Moved to Magadan" (Moy drug uyekhal v Magadan), one of Vysotsky's best known early tunes. In all, five of Vysotsky's songs have been dedicated to his friend. In Magadan Kohanovsky published his debut book of poetry The Sound Barrier (Звуковой барьер).

"Indian Summer" (Бабье лето), often performed in its original version by Vladimir Vysotsky at his early concerts, became popular among Moscow students. In 1964 composer Tamara Markova (having heard 'Babje Leto' in a suburban train, sung by a group of young people) approached Kokhanovsky and asked for the permission to write her own music for the piece. Markova's version of the song was recorded by Klavdiya Shulzhenko. Dissatisfied with the result, Kokhanovsky asked composer and performer Yuri Antonov to come up with another melody. This third version of "Babje Leto" was recorded by the pop band Poyushchiye Serdtsa (The Singing Hearts).

In 1976 Kokhanovsky recorded his debut album Indian Summer featuring the song "The Face in the Palms" put to music by Anatoly Dneprov, who's just left for the United States. The officials at the Melodiya record label asked Kohhanovsky to remove the track, he refused, and the album has never been released. His second one, The Discs Are Spinning, recorded in 1979 with Yuri Chernavsky and his Krasnye Maki (The Red Poppies) pop band, became a massive Soviet disco hit and by 1983 has sold 15 million copies. Throughout his career he also worked together on songs with a wide number of other singers and composers like Sergey Minaev, Vadim Baikov, Yuri Antonov, Valery Obodzinsky and Eson Kandov.

In 2014 Kohhanovsky published his new book, called The Mismatch (Несовпаденье), about the "mismatch of my set of moral values with those dominant today," as he explained. As of late 2014 he was working upon another book, Vysotsky Remembered featuring interviews with Alla Demidova, Yuri Lyubimov, Veniamin Smekhov and Eldar Ryazanov, among others.
