= Andrey Makarevich =

Soviet-Russian rock musician (born 1953)

- Андрей Макаревич
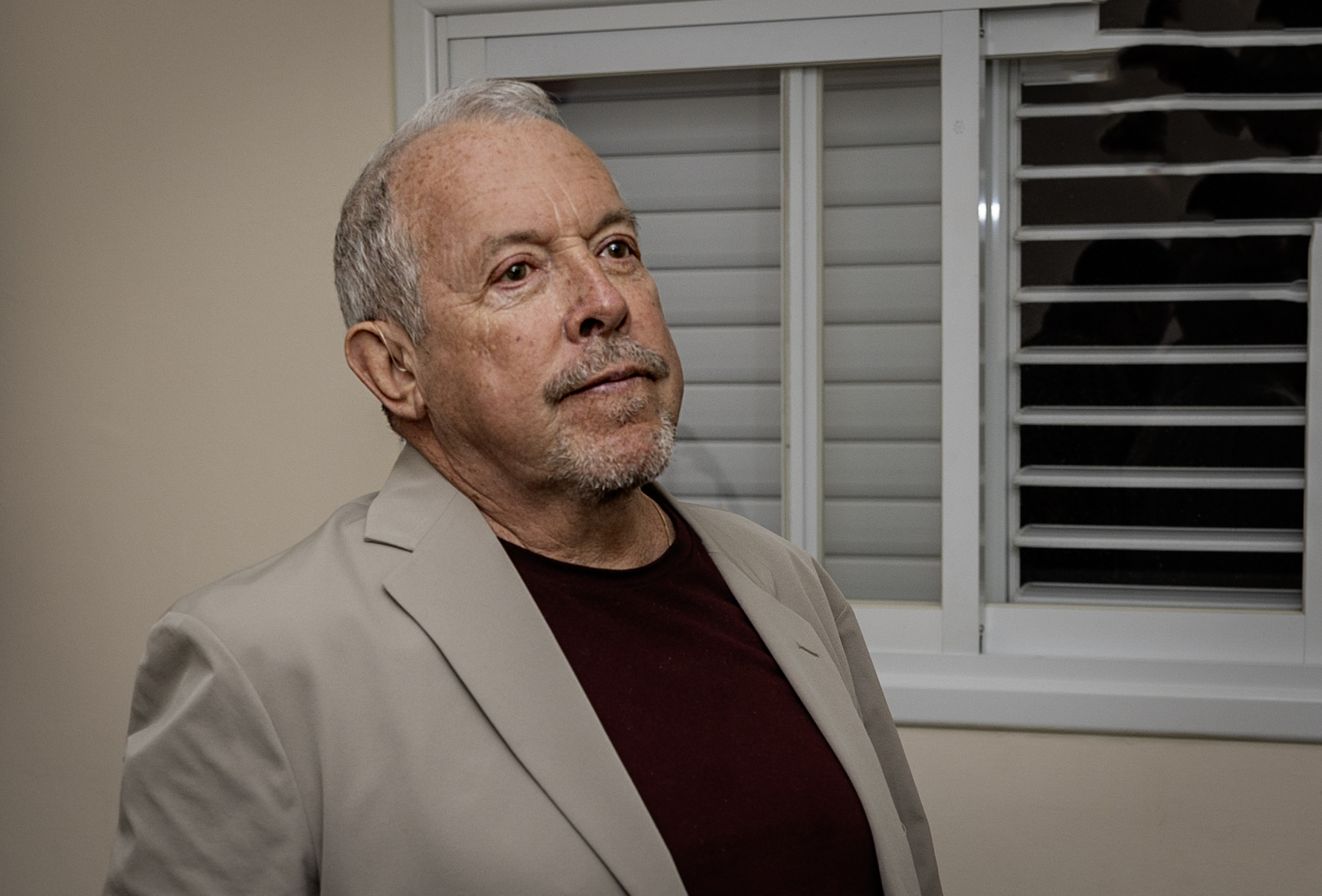
- Makarevich in 2024
- Born: 11 December 1953 (age 72); Moscow, Russian SFSR, Soviet Union
- Education: Moscow Architectural Institute
- Occupations: Singer; composer; writer; graphics artist; TV host; producer; poet
- Title: People's Artist of Russia (1999)
- Awards: Order "For Merit to the Fatherland" (4th class); Order of Honour

Andrey Makarevich's voice
recorded September 2013

Andrey Vadimovich Makarevich (Russian: Андрей Вадимович Макаревич; born 11 December 1953) is an Israeli and Soviet-Russian rock musician and the founder of Russia's oldest active rock band Mashina Vremeni (Time Machine).

== Personal life ==
Makarevich was born in Moscow to mixed-heritage parents of Belarusian (royal peasantry), Polish aristocracy (from the Sas family), Greek and Jewish origin. He graduated from the Moscow Architectural Institute as a graphic artist.

He was born to a mother of Jewish origin, tuberculosis specialist, microbiologist Nina Markovna Makarevich (née Shmuylovich, 1926–1989) and a father of Belarusian origin, architect and teacher of the Moscow Architectural Institute Vadim Grigorievich Makarevich (1924–1996).

Until 2011, he was a supporter of the Presidents Vladimir Putin and Dmitry Medvedev, believing that at that time there was no alternative to them, and that many problems were caused not by the authorities, but by the society itself. Starting in 2011, he opposed the re-election of Putin for a third term in the absence of real elections.

He immigrated to Israel in 2022, where he had a son from an Israeli-Ukrainian wife in his fourth marriage.

== Career ==
In his youth, Makarevich was a big fan of the English rock band The Beatles. In 1969, he founded Mashina Vremeni, a rock band largely inspired by Western rock and blues of the time. He is the band's singer and guitarist. While their music is written by all the members, Makarevich is the band's exclusive lyrics writer. Mashina Vremeni had a big influence on the development of rock music in USSR.

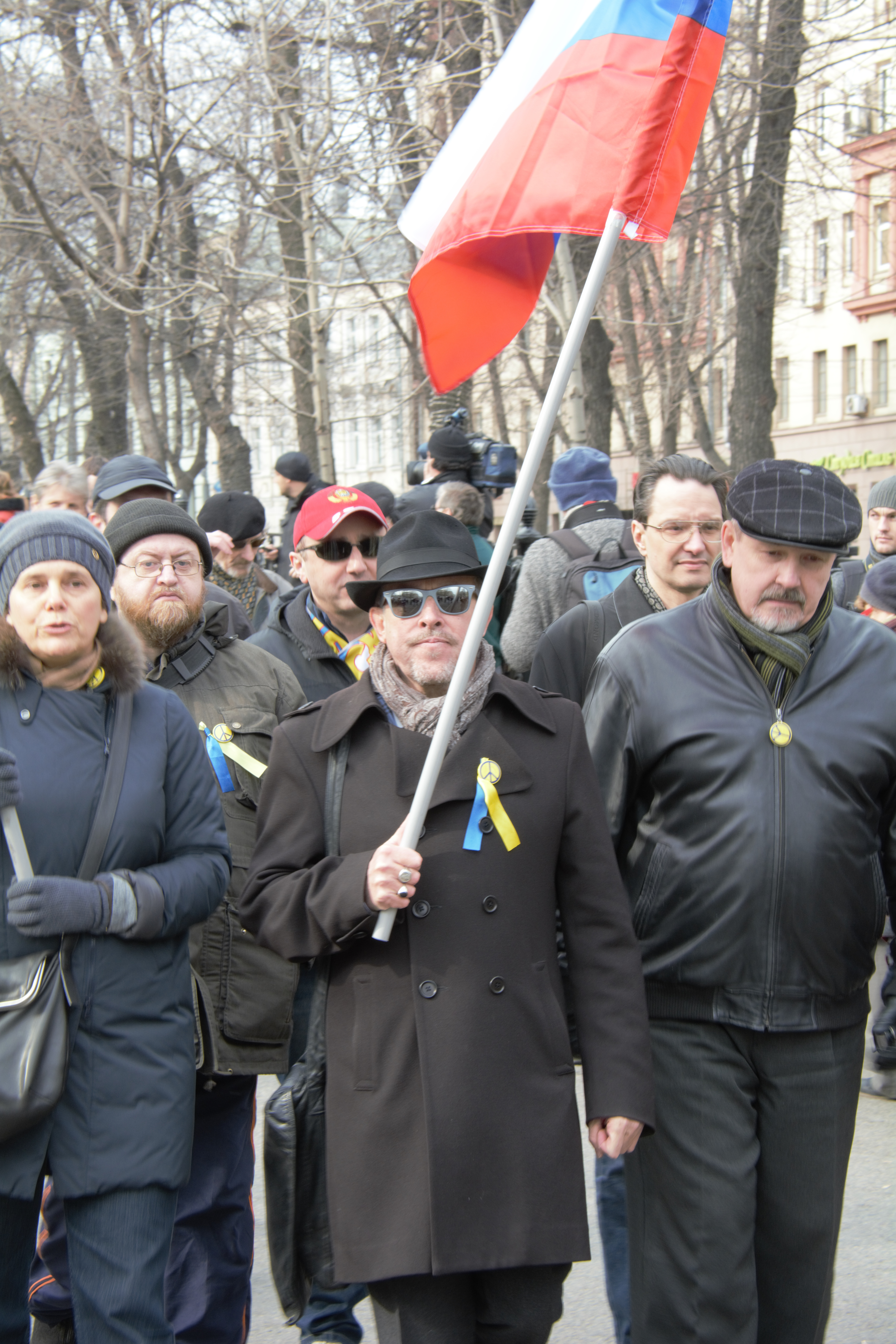
Andrey Makarevich and Irina Prokhorova at a 2014 anti-war protest in Russia

Makarevich also released eight solo albums, participated in regular TV shows and assisted other groups and artists. He authored several poetry collections and two volumes of memoirs. Makarevich is also interested in painting. He accompanied Mikhail Gorbachev on his solo album in 2009.

Makarevich performed for Ukraine's internally displaced people during the war in Donbas in the Ukrainian town Sviatohirsk in August 2014. Deputy of the State Duma Yevgeny Fyodorov vowed to strip Makarevich of all Russian state honors, describing his performance in Svyatogorsk as "collaborating with the fascists". Later that month, NTV aired a documentary titled 13 Friends of the Junta in which Makarevich was described as a "traitor" and supporter of fascists. The Moscow Times reported that footage of his concert "was merged with images of the fighting that he supposedly endorsed. The program never mentions that the concert was for the benefit of Ukraine's internally displaced children."

In July 2015, Makarevich together with Ukrainian band Haydamaky and Polish singer Maciej Maleńczuk presented a new song, "Only Love Will Keep You Alive" (Тільки любов залишить тебе живим). The lyrics of the song are written in three languages – Russian, Ukrainian and Polish.

In 2014 Makarevich received the Dr Rainer Hildebrandt Human Rights Award endowed by Alexandra Hildebrandt. The award is given annually in recognition of extraordinary, non-violent commitment to human rights. He supported the 2020–2021 Belarusian protests and criticized the Russian invasion of Ukraine. In 2022, Russia designated him a "foreign agent".

== Solo discography ==
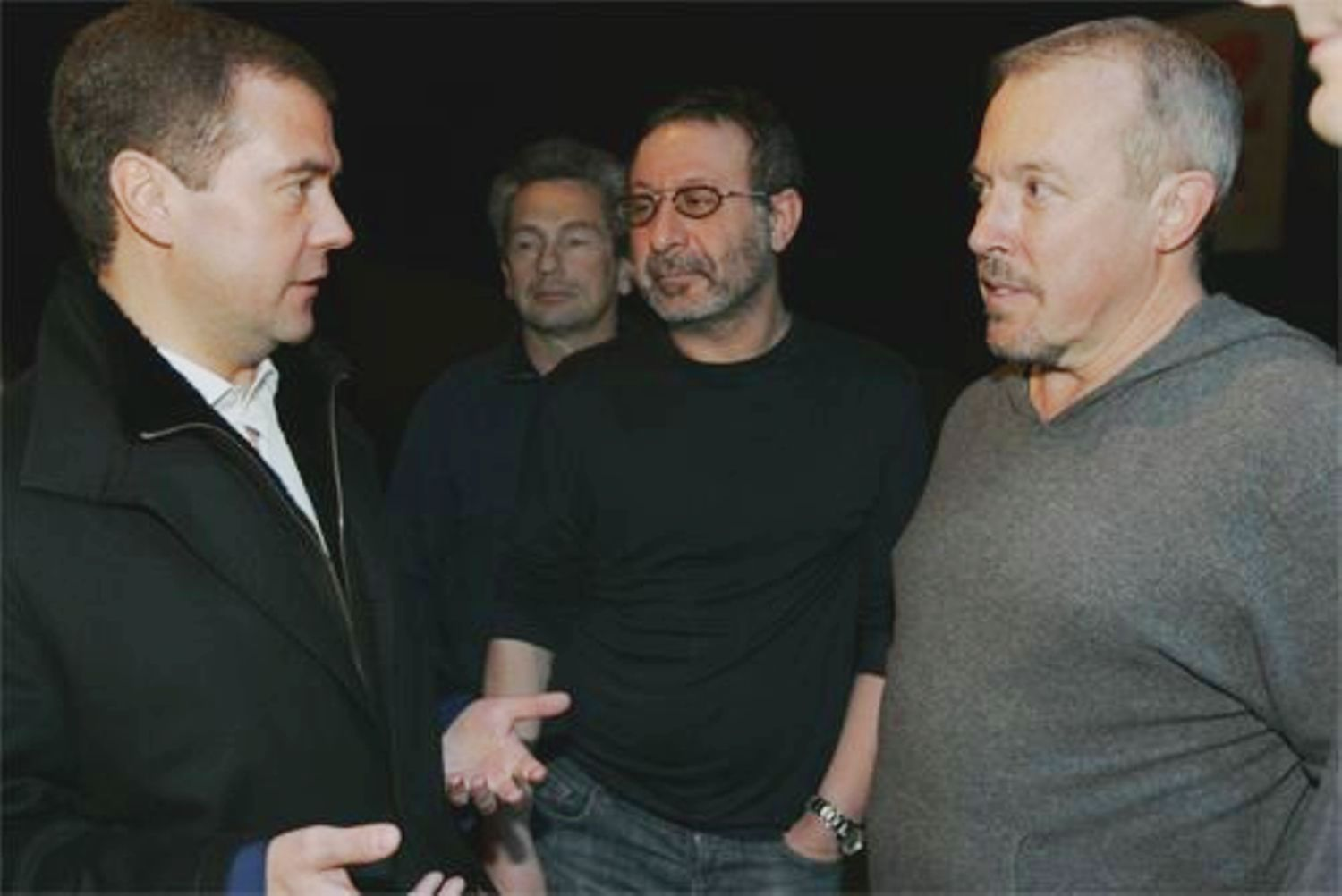
Makarevich speaking with Dmitry Medvedev

- 1989 – Песни под гитару
- 1991 – У ломбарда
- 1994 – Я рисую тебя
- 1997 – Двадцать лет спустя (Andrey Makarevich and Boris Grebenshchikov)
- 1996 – Песни, которые я люблю
- 1996 – Пионерские блатные песни (Aleksei Kozlov and Andrey Makarevich)
- 1998 – Женcкий Альбом (Andrey Makarevich and group Paporotnik)
- 1999 – Песни из кинофильма Перекресток
- 2000 – Время напрокат (Andrey Makarevich and group Kvartal)
- 2001 – Лучшее
- 2002 – И Т.Д.
- 2003 – Избранное
- 2003 – Тонкий шрам на любимой попе
- 2004 – От меня к тебе
- 2005 – Песни Геннадия Ни-Ли
- 2005 – Песни Булата Окуджавы
- 2006 – Старая машина
- 2007 – Штандер
- 2008 – Было не с нами
- 2008 – 55
- 2009 – Лучшее
- 2012 – Вино и слёзы
- 2023 – Убежище

== TV projects ==
- Смак (Smak) – cookery and chat program.
- Три окна (Three windows) – successor of Smak
- Подводный мир с Андреем Макаревичем (Underwater world with Andrey Makarevich)

== Film ==
Makarevich had a cameo in the 1999 cult film 8 ½ $ and played an important acting role in Eldar Ryazanov's 2000 film Still Waters. He has also composed music for a number of films.

== Exhibitions ==
- 1991 – Персональная выставка. Дворец Молодежи. Москва, Россия.
- 1991—1993 – Персональная выставка. Галерея "Борей". Санкт-Петербург, Россия.
- 1991—1993 – Совместная выставка с А. Белле. Санкт-Петербург, Россия.
- 1991—1993 – Серия передвижных выставок по городам России.
- 1994 – Андрей Макаревич, Андрей Белле. Галерея "Палитра". Санкт-Петербург, Россия.
- 1995 – Персональная выставка. Казерта, Италия.
- 1996 — Выставка Графики, галерея Ольги Хлебниковой, ЦДХ. Москва
- 1996 – Персональная выставка. Рига, Латвия.
- 1998 – "Арт-Манеж'98". ЦВЗ "Манеж". Москва, Россия.
- 1998 – Персональная выставка. "Галерея Аллы Булянской". Москва, Россия.
- 1999 – Арт-салон "ЦДХ'99". Центральный Дом Художника. Москва, Россия.
- 2000 – Консульство России. Лондон, Великобритания.
- 2000 – "Арт-Манеж'2000". ЦВЗ "Манеж". Москва, Россия.
- 2000 – Арт-салон "ЦДХ'2001". Центральный Дом Художника. Москва, Россия.

== Books ==
- Все очень просто ("Everything is very simple")
- Сам овца ("A sheep against the brave")
- Стихи и песни ("Poetry and songs")
- Андрей Макаревич: песни и стихи ("Andrey Makarevich: songs and poetry")
- 7 городов ("Seven towns")
- СМАК: встречи на кухне ("SMAK: meetings at a kitchen")
- Что такое дайвинг или акваланги для всех (в соавторстве с Юрием Бельским) {"What scuba diving is like or Scuba's for everyone!"}
- Место где свет ("A place where there is light")
- Занимательная наркология {"Entertaining study of drug addiction"}
