= To li eshchyo budet... =

1980 studio album by Alla Pugacheva

Studio album by Alla Pugacheva
- Released: 1980
- Recorded: 1977–1979
- Genre: Pop
- Length: 34:00
- Language: Russian
- Label: Melodiya

Alla Pugacheva chronology
| Podnimis nad suyetoj! (1980) | To li eshchyo budet... (1980) | Kak trevozhen etot put (1981) |

To li eshchyo budet... (Russian: То ли ещё будет...; transl. Something's Still To Come...) is the fourth studio album by Russian Soviet singer Alla Pugacheva released in 1980 by Melodiya.

== Album information ==
The album consisted in part of new songs, but also included songs from the film The Woman who Sings, recorded in 1977 ("Da","Ty ne stal sudboj" and "Etot mir"), and the song "Chto bylo odnazhdy", which was recorded for the movie 31 June, but was not included in the final version of the film. The record was released with a starting circulation of 12 thousand copies, and its final circulation was 2 million 200 thousand copies.

In 1981 the album was released in Czechoslovakia by Supraphon under the name Alla Pugačova.

== Track listing ==
Side one
| No. | Title | Lyrics | Music | Length |
|---|---|---|---|---|
| 1. | "Улетай, туча" ("Uletaj tucha", eng. "Fly away, cloud") | Viktor Reznikov | Viktor Reznikov | 4:58 |
| 2. | "Да" ("Da", eng. "Yes") | Leonid Derbenyov | Aleksandr Zatsepin | 3:25 |
| 3. | "Что было однажды" ("Chto bylo odnazhdy", eng. "What once happened") | Leonid Derbenyov | Aleksandr Zatsepin | 3:38 |
| 4. | "Ты не стал судьбой" ("y ne stal sudboj", eng. "You did not become destiny") | Leonid Derbenyov | Aleksandr Zatsepin | 4:57 |
| 5. | "Этот мир" ("Etot mir", eng. "This world") | Leonid Derbenyov | Aleksandr Zatsepin | 1:43 |

Side two
| No. | Title | Lyrics | Music | Length |
|---|---|---|---|---|
| 6. | "Скажи мне что-нибудь" ("Skazhi mne chto-nibud", eng. "Tell me something") | Robert Rozhdestvensky | Mark Minkov | 3:50 |
| 7. | "Эти летние дожди" ("Eti letniye dozhdi", eng. "These summer rains") | Semyon Kirsanov | Mark Minkov | 4:10 |
| 8. | "Ты возьми меня с собой" ("Ty vozmi menya s soboj", eng. "Take me with you") | Ilya Reznik | Eduard Khanok | 2:49 |
| 9. | "Песня первоклассника" ("Pesenka pervoklassnika", eng. "First-grader's song") | Igor Shaferan | Eduard Khanok | 2:30 |
| Total length: | | | | 30:00 |

== Charts ==
| Chart (1981) | Peak Position |
|---|---|
| USSR (Moskovskij Komsomolets) | 8 |

== Bibliography ==
- Razzakov, Fedor (2003). Алла Пугачёва: По ступеням славы [Alla Pugacheva: On the steps of glory] (PDF) (in Russian). Moscow: Eksmo. ISBN 5-8153-0059-4. Archived from the original (PDF) on 2014-02-01.
