= Yadviga Poplavskaya =

Soviet-Belarusian singer

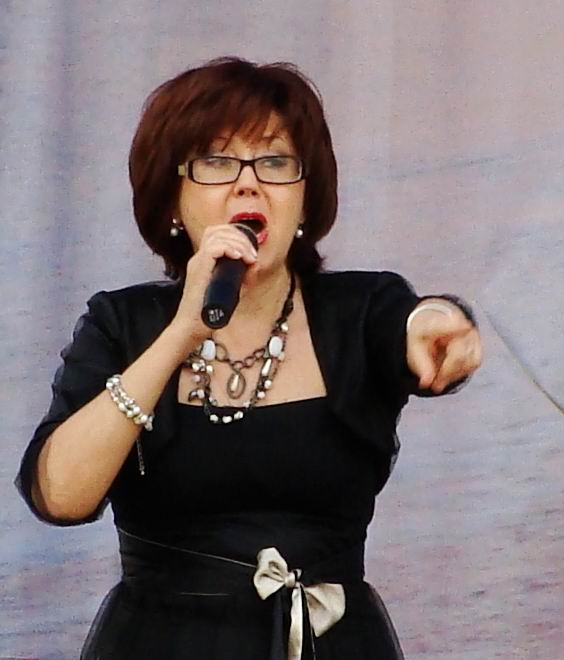

Background information
- Born: Yadviga Konstantinovna Poplavskaya; 1 May 1949 (age 77); Dalidavichy, BSSR
- Genres: Estrada, Popular music
- Occupation: Singer-songwriter
- Instruments: vocals, piano
- Years active: 1971-present
- Formerly of: Verasy

Yadviga Konstantinovna Poplavskaya (Belarusian: Ядвіга Канстанцінаўна Паплаўская, Russian: Ядвига Константиновна Поплавская born 1 May 1949) is a Soviet and Belarusian singer, member of the first ensemble Verasy and a People’s Artist of Belarus (2005).

== Biography ==
Poplavskaya was born into a musical family. Her father, choirmaster Konstantin Poplavsky, created Belarusian State Folk Choir with Gennady Tsitovich.

Poplavskaya graduated from Belarusian Conservatory twice, in 1972 for piano and again in 1988 for composition. In 1971, she was among the founders of the Minsk-based VIA group Verasy; she played keyboards, sung vocals, and wrote arrangements. In 1973, Alexander Tikhanovich joined the ensemble (bass guitar, vocal, trumpet), and the two would later marry.

In 1986, Poplavskaya and Tikhanovich parted ways with the Verasy ensemble, and in 1987 they joined the recently organized State Orchestra of Belarus under the direction of Mikhail Finberg.

After winning the 1988 Pesnya goda with the song "Schastlivy sluchay" (Счастливый случай, "Happy Occasion" or "Lucky Chance"; music by Eduard Khanok, lyrics by Larisa Rubalskaya), Poplavskaya and Tihanovich created a duet of the same name, later expanding into a full band. Within the group, Poplavskaya sang, arranged music, and played keyboards. The group participated in the Golden Lyre festival (Belarus), and toured in Russia, Belarus, Bulgaria, Czechoslovakia, Germany, Yugoslavia, Poland, Hungary, Finland, France, Canada and Israel.

In 1988, Poplavskaya and Tikhanovich organized The Theater of Songs, through whose studio many young Belarusian performers went, including Alexander Solodukha and Lyapis Trubetskoy.

The song “Charaunitsa” was included in the repertoire of the duet Poplavskaya and Tihanovich (as well as the “Chuk i Gek” group, the song and dance ensemble of the Armed Forces of Belarus). Poplavskaya and Sergey Sukhomlin won For the arrangement, Poplavskaya and Sergey Sukhomlin won an award for “The Best Arranger of the Year”.

=== Dispute with Eduard Khanok ===
After Alexander Tikhanovich died, Eduard Khanok declared on 28 April 2017 that his copyrights were grossly violated and forbade the performance or transmission of a number of Verasy and Lucky Chance works he had composed. Anastasia Tikhanovich, the daughter of Poplavskaya and Tikhanovich, said Khanok demanded $25,000 for the right to perform his songs, which the family would not be able to afford due to her father's medical expenses. Additionally, he announced his intention to sue Poplavskaya “in connection with the protection of honor, dignity and business reputation", noting that not a single Belarusian newspaper mentioned Khanok's authorship of the song "Robin" in articles about Tikhanovich's funeral. On 3 May, he said he no longer intended to sue, expressing the opinion that it was enough for him to ban his songs. On 5 July, however, Khanok changed his mind and again announced his intention to go forward with court proceedings, despite the fact that the ban was not violated.

== Personal life ==
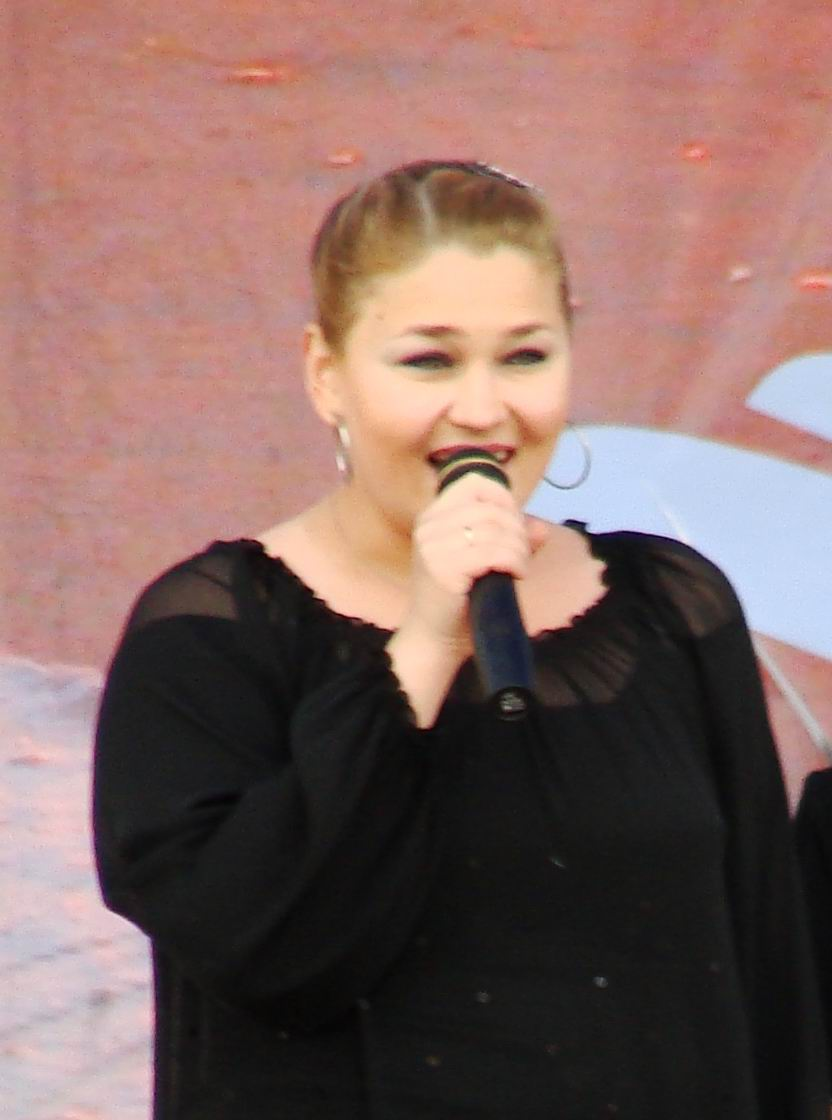
Anastasia Tikhanovich

Poplavskaya was married to Alexander Tikhanovich until his death on 28 January 2017. Together, they had a daughter, Anastasia (born 1980).

== Discography ==
Albums with the ensemble "Verasy":

- “Our disco”
- “Music for all”

Albums of Yadviga Poplavskaya and Alexander Tikhanovich:

- “Happy Occasion” (Firm Melody, LP, 1989)
- “Music of Love” (Firm Melody; Eddy (Minsk), LP, 1995)
- "From" Robin "to ..." (Eddy. CD, 1997)
- “Life is a wonderful moment” (Master Sound, CD, 1997)
- “Love is Destiny” (West Records, 2008)
