= Maestro (Alla Pugacheva song) =

Single by Alla Pugacheva

from the album Kak trevozhen etot put
- Language: Russian
- B-side: "Dezhurny angel"
- Released: June 1981
- Genre: Pop
- Length: 5:40
- Label: Melodiya
- Composer: Raimonds Pauls
- Lyricist: Ilya Reznik

Alla Pugacheva singles chronology
"Ety letniye dozhdi" (1980)	"Maestro" (1981)	"Dezhurny angel" (1981)

"Maestro" (Russian: Маэстро) is a song by Russian singer Alla Pugacheva. It was released in June 1981, by Melodiya as the lead single from her fifth studio album, Kak trevozhen etot put (1982).

== Background ==
The song "Maestro" is one of the most famous and popular songs in the repertoire of Pugacheva. This song was the first result of the singer's collaboration with composer Raimonds Pauls. Ilya Reznik, the lyricist, had already worked with Pugacheva and by the time the song was created, he had already co-authored several hits in the singer's repertoire.

The song got to Pugacheva by accident. Pauls sent her another song, "Dva strizha", but Pugacheva did not like it, although the lyricist Reznik drew attention to the melody. It was he who wrote the lyrics. According to Pugacheva's memoirs, 15 versions of the song were written, and the recording of the song lasted for a year.

== Release ==
The song was first performed on the air of the New Year's show Little Blue Light in 1980. In June 1981, the single "Maestro" was released. The song "Dezhurny angel" (music by Pugacheva, lyrics by Reznik) was used as a b-side. A month earlier, a flexi single was released, but the songs "Papa kupil avtomobil" and "Tri zhelaniya" from the album Podnimis nad suyetoy! (1980) were used as the b-side there.

According to a survey of readers of Moskovskij Komsomolets, the song was recognized as the best for seven months in a row (from January to July 1981), it was also recognized as the song of the year. For the song "Maestro" Pugacheva and the authors of the song in 1981 became laureates of the annual variety television festival Song of the Year. By the end of 1982, the single had sold a record 2,600,000 copies.

== Bibliography ==
- Razzakov, Fyodor (2003). Алла Пугачёва: По ступеням славы [Alla Pugacheva: On the steps of glory] (in Russian). Moscow: Eksmo. ISBN 5-8153-0059-4.
