= To Serve Russia =

Russian patriotic song

Song
- Language: Russian
- Genre: March
- Songwriter: Eduard Khanok
- Lyricist: Ilya Reznik

"To Serve Russia" (Russian: Служить России, romanized: Sluzhit' Rossii) is a Russian patriotic song written in the early 2000s.

== Creation ==
"To Serve Russia" was written by composer Eduard Khanok (Эдуа́рд Хано́к) and lyricist Ilya Reznik (Илья Peзник) in the early 2000s.

The first public appearance of "To Serve Russia" occurred on 10 November 2000 for Police and Internal Affairs Servicemen's Day, sung by Nikolay Baskov (Николай Басков) at the Grand Kremlin Palace.

== Usage ==
=== Russian Federation ===
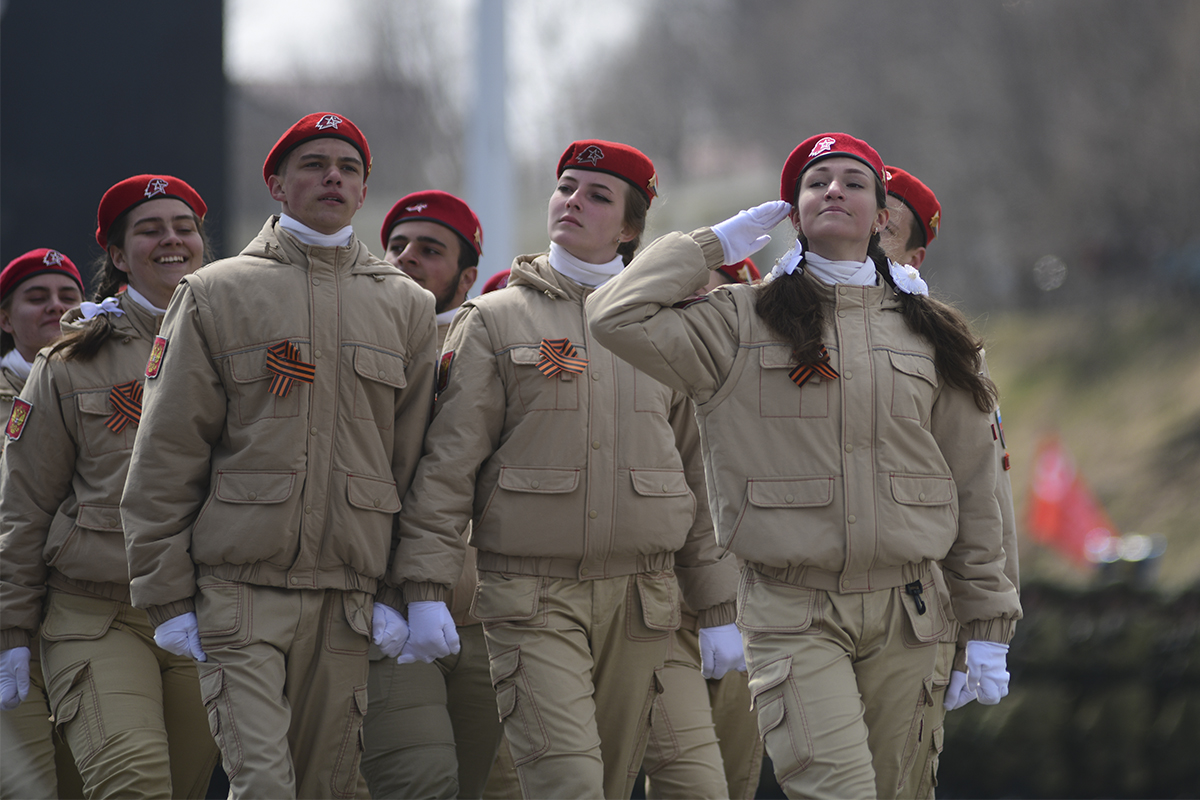
Cadets of the Young Army Cadets National Movement

An instrumental variant of the song, adjusted for marching cadence was featured in the 2008 Moscow Victory Day Parade (Парад Победы в Москве), celebrating the triumph of Russia (Note: As the continuator state to the Soviet Union) over Nazi Germany. In each subsequent Victory Day parade, the song has been played during the infantry column precession. In recent years, "To Serve Russia" has also been included in performances of the Alexandrov Ensemble. (Note: Also known as the Red Army Choir)

"To Serve Russia" was adopted as the official anthem of the Young Army Cadets National Movement following its establishment in 2016.

=== North Korea ===
In North Korea, both the original song, as well as a derivative with Korean lyrics are increasingly popular. In 2009, a recording with the original Russian lyrics was performed by the State Merited Chorus and Symphony Orchestra of the Korean People's Army, alongside other patriotic songs from Russia and China. In July 2023, during the visit of Russian Defence Minister Sergei Shoigu to North Korea for the 70th Day of Victory, the song was performed in a concert, alongside other contemporary Russian songs.

For the 2024 visit by Vladimir Putin to North Korea, an instrumental fife and drum variant was played by the band of the State Affairs Commission during a concert in the Pyongyang Indoor Stadium.

In October 2025, during a parade celebrating the 80th anniversary of the Workers' Party of Korea, a contingent of Korean People's Army soldiers of the Overseas Operation Battalion who took part in the Kursk offensive marched to "To Serve Russia" with joint Russian and North Korean colours, returned from Kursk Oblast. Dmitry Medvedev was present at the parade.

In November 2024, a derivative of "To Serve Russia", with Korean lyrics was performed by the State Merited Chorus during the National Defence Development; 2024 exhibition in Pyongyang. While the song maintains the march composed by Eduard Khanok, the lyrics are changed to match North Korean military ideology (Juche), named "To Serve the Motherland and the People" (조국과 인민을 위하여 복무함). (Note: Not to be confused with a song of the same name performed by Moranbong Band in 2014.) On 25 April 2025, the song was used as a centrepiece composition for the launch of the North Korean destroyer Choe Hyon.

=== Transnistria ===
A variant of the song with minor changes has been adopted by the Armed Forces of Moldova's unrecognized breakaway region of Transnistria (officially the Pridnestrovian Moldavian Republic) as "To Serve the Fatherland" (Russian: Служить Отчизне).

== Lyrics ==
=== Russian original ===
Cyrillic script

I
Полки идут стеной, красиво держат строй,
И гордо шелестят знамёна
Комбат и рядовой, единою судьбой
Мы связаны навек, друг мой!

Припев:
Служить России, суждено тебе и мне
Служить России—удивительной стране,
Где солнце новое встаёт на небе синем
Плечом к плечу идут российские войска
И пусть военная дорога нелегка,
Мы будем верою и правдою служить России!

II
В бесстрашии атак спасли мы Русский флаг,
И дом родной, и наши песни
А коль придёт беда, собою мы тогда
Отчизну заслоним, друг мой

(Припев)

III
Полки идут стеной, красиво держат строй,
И вместе с нами вся Россия
И он, и ты, и я—армейская семья,
И этим мы сильны, друг мой!

(Припев)

Romanization of Russian

I
Polkí idút stenóy, krasívo dérzhat stroy,
I górdo shelestyát znamyóna
Kombát i ryadovóy, yedínoyu sud'bóy
My svyázany navék, drug moy!

Pripév:
Sluzhít' Rossíi, suzhdenó tebé i mne
Sluzhít' Rossíi—udivítel'noy strané,
Gde sólntse nóvoye vstayót na nébe sínem
Plechóm k plechú idút rossíyskiye voyská
I pust' voyénnaya doróga nelegká,
My búdem véroyu i právdoyu sluzhít' Rossíi!

II
V besstráshii aták spaslí my Rússkiy flag,
I dom rodnóy, i náshi pésni
A kol' pridyót bedá, sobóyu my togdá
Otchíznu zasloním, drug moy

(Pripév)

III
Polkí idút stenóy, krasívo dérzhat stroy,
I vméste s námi vsya Rossíya
I on, i ty, i ya—arméyskaya sem'yá,
I étim my sil'ný, drug moy!

(Pripév)

IPA transcription (Note: See Russian phonology and Help:IPA/Russian.)

1
[pɐɫ.ˈkʲi‿ɪ.ˈdut stʲɪ.ˈnoj krɐ.ˈsʲi.və 'dʲer.ʐɐt stroj]
[i‿ˈɡor.də ʂɨ.lʲɪ.ˈsʲtʲat znɐ.mʲɵ.nə]
[kɐm.ˈbat‿i rʲɪ.dɐ.ˈvoj jɪ.ˈdʲi.nə.jʊ sʊdʲ.ˈboj]
[mɨ‿ˈsvʲa.zə.nɨ nɐ.ˈvʲek ˈdruɡ‿moj]

[prʲɪ.ˈpʲef]:
[sɫʊ.ˈʐɨt rɐ.ˈsʲi.jɪ sʊʐ.dʲɪ.'no tʲɪ.ˈbʲe i‿mnʲe]
[sɫʊ.ˈʐɨt rɐ.ˈsʲi.jɪ ʊdʲɪ.ˈvʲi.tʲɪlʲ.nəj strɐ.ˈnʲe]
[kdʲe ˈson.(t)͡sə ˈno.və.jə‿fstɐ.ˈjɵt na ˈnʲe.bʲɪ ˈsi.nʲɪm]
[plʲɪ.ˈt͡ɕɵm k͡ plʲɪ.ˈt͡ɕu ɪ.ˈdut rɐ.ˈsʲij.skʲɪ.jɪ vɐj.ˈska]
[ɪ pustʲ vɐ.ˈjen.nə.jə də.ˈro.ɡə nʲɪ.lʲɪх.ˈka]
[mɨ ˈbu.dʲɪm ˈvʲe.rə.jʊ i ˈprav.də.jʊ sɫʊ.ˈʐɨt rɐ.ˈsʲi.jɪ]

2
[v‿bʲɪs.ˈstra.ʂɨ.jɪ‿ɐ.ˈtak ˈspɐ.slʲi mɨ‿ˈrus.kʲɪj flak]
[i‿dom rɐd.ˈnoj i‿ˈna.ʂɨ ˈpʲesʲ.nʲɪ]
[a‿kolʲ prʲɪ.ˈdʲɵt bʲɪ.ˈda sɐ.ˈbo.jʊ mɨ‿tɐɡ.ˈda]
[ɐt.ˈt͡ɕiz.nʊ zə.sɫɐ.ˈnʲim ˈdruɡ‿moj]

([prʲɪ.ˈpʲef])

3
[pɐɫ.ˈkʲi‿ɪ.ˈdut stʲɪ.ˈnoj krɐ.ˈsʲi.və 'dʲer.ʐɐt stroj]
[i‿ˈvmʲesʲ.tʲɪ s‿ˈna.mʲɪ‿fsʲa rɐ.ˈsʲi.jə]
[i‿on i‿tɨ i‿ja ɐr.ˈmʲej.skə.jə sʲɪm.ˈja]
[i‿ˈe.tʲɪm mɨ sʲɪlʲ.ˈnɨ ˈdruɡ‿moj]

([prʲɪ.ˈpʲef])

=== English translation ===
I
The regiments stand like a wall, marching straight and tall,
And the banners fly proudly
Commander and private, are bound by one fate
We are bound together, my friend

Chorus:
Serving Russia, is our destiny
Serving Russia—the amazing country,
Where the new sun rises on a blue sky
Shoulder to shoulder walk Russia's fighters
And even if the road becomes uneasy,
We will with faith and truth serve Russia!

II
We fearlessly attack to save Russia's flag,
And our homes and our songs
And if trouble comes near, then we will volunteer
To protect the fatherland, my friend

(Chorus)

III
The regiments stand like a wall, marching straight and tall,
And with us is all of Russia
And he, and you, and I—an army family,
And that is what makes us strong, my friend!

(Chorus)
