= Zvyozdnoye leto =

Song by Alla Pugacheva

from the album Podnimis nad suyetoy!
- Language: Russian
- Released: 1978
- Genre: Pop
- Length: 4:43
- Label: Melodiya
- Composer: Alla Pugacheva
- Lyricist: Ilya Reznik

"Zvyozdnoye leto" (Russian: Звёздное лето; transl. Starry summer) is a song by Russian singer Alla Pugacheva.

This song was the first that Pugacheva wrote together with the poet Ilya Reznik. It was originally recorded at the tone studio of the Armenfilm film studio for the children's film Starry Summer (directed by Levon Grigoryan) in September 1978. The idea to invite Pugacheva to perform songs for the film was accidental, many children read poems at the auditions, and sang mostly hits of the young singer Alla Pugacheva.

In January 1979, Pugacheva presented her first concert program, The Woman Who Sings, in which she included "Zvyozdnoye leto". For the album Podnimis nad suyetoy! (1980) Pugacheva recorded new versions of this song.

Although the song was not released as a single, it was a huge success in the Soviet Union. In the hit parade Zvukovaya Dorozhka it held a leading position for several months. The song was awarded the Pesnya goda award. And Pugacheva herself performed it at her concerts and in various TV shows.

In 2023, a remix of the song created by Geoffplaysguitar became the soundtrack to the game Atomic Heart.

== Bibliography ==
- Razzakov, Fyodor (2003). Алла Пугачёва: По ступеням славы [Alla Pugacheva: On the steps of glory] (in Russian). Moscow: Eksmo. ISBN 5-8153-0059-4.
