= Angelika Yutt =

Russian singer (born 1969)

- Born: November 5, 1969 (age 55); Simferopol, USSR
- Genres: Pop, house, trance, opera, ambiet, eurodance
- Occupation(s): Singer, vocal trainer, producer, music composer.
- Website: angelikamusic.ru

Angelika Aleksandrovna Yutt (Russian: Анжелика Александровна Ютт; born 5 November 1969), better known by stage name Angelika (Russian: АНЖЕЛИКА), is a Russian opera, pop, house and trance singer, vocal trainer, producer and music composer. Her voice is a coloratura soprano.

== Biography ==
Born in Simferopol in 1969, Yutt studied at a music school, then at the Simferopol music college. From 1988 to 1989 she studied at the Crimean Ukrainian Drama and Musical Comedy theater.

In 1993 Angelika Yutt won the first prize in Maladzyechna.

From 1997 to 1999 she performed with the band Syabry. In 1998 she released her second solo album Planet of Love, as well as the album Mama Maroussia album and "The Charmed Paradise" book of videos.

In 1998 Angelika Yutt won Song of the Year in the Belarusian hit parade music video festival.

In 2002 she began working with Moscow producer Igor Siliviorstov, releasing the Above The Clouds album.

In late 2013, Angelica Yutt became the first Russian artist to sing the Russian national anthem in a soul style. The video of this interpretation sparked a backlash on social media.

Angelika Yutt is a member of the Russian Authors Society (RAO) and the Russian Professional Writers Union. She now works as a vocal teacher and producer.

== Filmography ==
2012 – "The Lawyer" (TV serial), Galina the witness

== Awards ==
- 1993 – "Molodechno-93" vocal contest, the 1st prize
- 1993 – "Vilnius-93" international vocal competition, Diploma title.
- 1998 – "Belarusian hit parade’98", the 1st place in “The Best Songs Of The Year”
