= Pakhomenko =

Pakhomenko (Ukrainian: Пахоменко) is a Ukrainian surname. Notable people with the surname include:

- Igor Pakhomenko (born 1992), Russian gymnast
- Maria Pakhomenko (1937–2013), Soviet and Russian singer
