= Kak trevozhen etot put =

Studio album by Alla Pugacheva
- Released: September 1982
- Recorded: 1980–1981
- Genre: Pop; Funk rock
- Length: 1:16:12
- Language: Russian
- Label: Melodiya

Alla Pugacheva chronology
To li eshchyo budet... (1980)	Kak trevozhen etot put (1982)	Akh, kak khochetsya zhit (1985)

Professional ratings
Review scores
Source	Rating
InterMedia	9/10

Kak trevozhen etot put (Russian: Как тревожен этот путь; transl. How Disturbing Is This Way) is the fifth studio album by Russian Soviet singer Alla Pugacheva released in 1982 by Melodiya. It was released as a double album, but later also distributed as separate long plays. The album sold 7 million copies as of 1983.

The album contains studio recordings from 1980–1981; the second disc of the album contains several live recordings from 1981 from one of the solo concerts of Pugacheva's program "Monologues of a singer".

There was also an export version of the album called How Disturbing Is This Way for distribution abroad. In Czechoslovakia the album was released in 1984 by the name Dávná Píseň.

== Background ==
In August 1980, Pugacheva began shooting in the lead role in the film Recital, but was subsequently suspended from work and did not tour in the USSR for several months. In November–December 1980, she toured Czechoslovakia (as part of the programme "Days of culture of the USSR in Czechoslovakia") and in the cities of Germany. In Cologne, Pugacheva participated in the WDR radio concert as part of the international music festival. In December 1980, for the first time since the September incident with Recital Pugacheva performed in the USSR — in the Moscow variety Theater, she gave a series of concerts "Alla Pugacheva Theater".

Preparation for filming in the film "Recital" and for concerts for guests of the "Olympics-80", as a result — infrequent tours and rare appearances of Pugacheva on Central television in 1980 affected her popularity. In 1980, there were almost no new hits. The songs "Moskovsky romans", "Ukhodya - ukhodi", "Kogda ya ujdu", "Kak trevozhen etot put" did not gain much popularity among listeners. And only one song became the most popular - "Uletaj, tucha", by the then unknown composer Viktor Reznikov. For this reason, for the first time in 4 years, Pugacheva did not become a winner of the all-Union festival "Pesnya goda". In General, 1980 was a difficult and crucial year in the singer's creative and personal life, separating the period of the 1970s and 1980s.

== Release ==
Pugacheva finished work on the album in 1981, but Melodiya constantly delayed its release. As a result, the album was released only in September 1982. In anticipation of the album's release, three singles were released as minions "Maestro","Dezhurny angel" and "Ya bolshe ne revnuyu". Originally released as a double album, it was later also distributed as separate records: Kak trevozhen etot put 1 and Kak trevozhen etot put 2.

== Recording ==
At the end of 1980, Pugacheva started working on the record. In "Little Blue Light" in 1980–81, Pugacheva performs the song "Maestro" to the music of the Latvian composer Raimonds Pauls and poems by Ilya Reznik. Thanks to this song, there is a creative tandem "Reznik-Pauls-Pugacheva" and such songs as "Starinniye chasy", "Vosvrashcheniye", "Bez menya", "Delu vremya" and others. The composer of almost all the songs from the album was Pugacheva herself. The music for the three compositions was written by Raimonds Pauls, the song "Beda" was written by Vladimir Vysotsky, which in the early 1980s was often performed by Alla Pugacheva at solo concerts, in particular in the concert program "Monologues of the singer". Vysotsky wrote "Beda" for his wife Marina Vladi in 1973. The album also includes several concert recordings from 1981 from one of the solo concerts of Pugacheva's program "Monologues of a singer".

== Track listing ==
Side one
No.	Title	Lyrics	Music	Length
1.	"Люди, люди" ("Lyudi, lyudi", trans. "People, People")	Ilya Reznik	Alla Pugacheva	4:34
2.	"Усталость" ("Ustalost", trans. "Tiredness")	Ilya Reznik	Alla Pugacheva	4:30
3.	"Я больше не ревную" ("Ya bolshe ne revnuyu", trans. "I'm Not Jealous Any More")	Osip Mandelstam	Alla Pugacheva	5:15
4.	"Дежурный ангел" ("Dezhurny angel", trans. "The Angel On Duty")	Ilya Reznik	Alla Pugacheva	4:33

Side two
No.	Title	Lyrics	Music	Length
5.	"Беда" ("Beda", trans. "Trouble")	Vladimir Vysotsky	Vladimir Vysotsky	5:07
6.	"Лестница" ("Lestnitsa", trans. "A Staircase")	Ilya Reznik	Alla Pugacheva	3:50
7.	"Как тревожен этот путь" ("Kak trevozhen etot put", trans. "How Disturbing Is This Way")	Ilya Reznik	Alla Pugacheva	4:57
8.	"Держи меня, соломинка" ("Derzhi menya, solominka", trans. "Catching At A Straw")	Yevgeny Shelonsky	Alla Pugacheva	4:20

Side three
No.	Title	Lyrics	Music	Length
9.	"Первый шаг" ("Pervy shag", trans. "The First Step")	Ilya Reznik	Alla Pugacheva	4:26
10.	"Вот так случилось, мама" (live) ("Vot tak sluchilos, mama", trans. "It So Happened, Mom")	Oleg Milyavsky	Alla Pugacheva	3:41
11.	"Старая песня" (live) ("Staraya pesnya", trans. "An Old Song")	Ilya Reznik	Alla Pugacheva	4:28
12.	"Когда я буду бабушкой" (live) ("Когда ya stanu babushkoj", trans. "When I Become Grandma")	Marina Tsvetaeva	Alla Pugacheva	3:07
13.	"Жди и помни меня" ("Zhdi i pomni menya", trans. "Wait For Me And Remember Me")	Ilya Reznik	Alla Pugacheva	4:26

Side four
No.	Title	Lyrics	Music	Length
14.	"Маэстро" ("Maestro")	Ilya Reznik	Raimonds Pauls	5:40
15.	"Старинные часы" ("Starinnye chasy", trans. "Old Clock")	Ilya Reznik	Raimonds Pauls	4:38
16.	"Песня на Бис" (live) ("Pesnya na Bis", trans. "An Encore")	Andrei Voznesensky	Raimonds Pauls	7:17
Total length:				1:00:39

== Charts ==
Quarterly chart performance for Kak trevozhen etot put
Chart (1983)	Peak position
Soviet Albums (Moskovskij Komsomolets)	1

== Bibliography ==
- Razzakov F. (2003) [Алла Пугачёва: По ступеням славы]. Alla Pugacheva: On the steps of glory (PDF). Moscow: Eksmo. ISBN 5-8153-0059-4. Archived from the original (PDF) on 2014-02-01.
