= Podnimis nad suyetoy! =

1980 studio album by Alla Pugacheva

Studio album by Alla Pugacheva
- Released: November 1980
- Recorded: 1979
- Genre: Pop; Funk rock
- Length: 30:19
- Language: Russian
- Label: Melodiya
- Producer: Alla Pugacheva; Yurij Stelnik

Alla Pugacheva chronology
Arlekino i drugiye (1979)	Podnimis nad suyetoy! (1980)	To li eshchyo budet... (1980)

Singles from Podnimis nad suyetoy!
- 1. "Vot tak sluchilos, mama" Released: September 1980

Podnimis nad suyetoy! (Russian: Поднимись над суетой!; transl. Be Beyond a Fuss of Life) is the third studio album by Soviet singer Alla Pugacheva, released in 1980 by Melodiya.

== Album information ==
The album was named after the song of the same name. The composer of all the songs is Alla Pugacheva. The song "Podnimis nad suyetoy" was written in 1978 for the film "Foam". The recording was made in the tone studio of the Mosfilm Studio in a duet with Mikhail Boyarsky and was played on the radio during 1979. In the fall of 1979, Pugacheva recorded a new version of the song for the upcoming album at the studio of Melodiya.

The songs "Papa kupil avtomobil", "Tri zhelanya" and "Zvyozdnoye leto" were originally recorded at the tone studio of the Armenfilm film studio for the children's film "Star summer" (directed by Levon Grigoryan) in September 1978. In January 1979, Pugacheva presented her first concert program, "The Woman Who Sings", which included these three songs. For the album Podnimis nad suyetoy! Pugacheva recorded new versions of these songs.

The songs "Leningrad" and "Muzykant" were written by Pugacheva in 1977 based on poems by Osip Mandelstam; the composition "Leningrad" is dedicated to the memory of the popular Leningrad singer Lydia Clement, who died of a transient illness in 1964 at the age of 27. In the text of the poem by Alla Pugacheva has been amended: in particular, gone is the mention of St. Petersburg (totally impossible for the Soviet stage in the late 1970s), and the line "which I find dead voices" changed to "which find voice." The song "Muzykant" is written on the poem "Alexander Hertzovich Lived". Both songs were performed by Alla Pugacheva from 1977 to 1983 in solo concert programs, including "The Woman Who Sings" (1979-1980) and "Monologues of a Singer" (1981-1983). In the mid and late 1980s, Pugacheva performed the song "Leningrad" at concerts only during tours in Leningrad.

The song "Chto ne mozhet sdelat atom" was written in 1979 based on the lyrics of the popular 1940s-1960s American country singer Woody Guthrie translated by Tatyana Sikorskaya.

The songs "Vsye sily dazhe prilagaya" and "Vot tak sluchilos, mama" appeared in the singer's repertoire in 1978. During 1978–1979, they were played on radio and television in their original studio versions. For the album Podnimis nad suyetoy! Pugacheva recorded new versions of these songs. The melody of the song "Vsye sily dazhe prilagaya" appeared in 1977 and was played in the movie "The Woman Who Sings" as background music.

== Cover art ==
The author of the photo used on the album cover is Mosfilm staff photographer Vyacheslav Maneshin, who often photographed the singer in the late 1970s and early 1980s. The photos were taken in August 1979 on the balcony of the Yalta-Intourist hotel in Yalta, where the singer was touring at the time. Maneshin and Pugacheva agreed that "instead of a loose red mane, which everyone is already used to, you need to remove it with smoothly combed back hair". This and other photos from that photoshoot in the 1980s were often printed in magazines, posters, playbills, calendars and other promotional products of the singer. In 2009, some photos were included in the photo album "Alla Art", released for the 60th anniversary of the singer.

However, not all copies of the album came with the author's version of the cover with a photo of Maneshin. So, part of the circulation of the Aprelevsky plant and the entire circulation of the Leningrad plant came out with simple abstract drawings instead of the original photo. As part of the circulation of the Tashkent plant, a frame from the movie "The Woman Who Sings" was used on the cover.

== Track listing ==
All music is composed by Alla Pugacheva.

Side one
No.	Title	Lyrics	Length
1.	"Все силы даже прилагая" ("Vse sily dazhe prilagaya", eng. "Even with all my efforts")	Yevgeny Yevtushenko	2:35
2.	"Вот так случилось, мама" ("Vot tak sluchilos, mama", eng. "That's how it happened, mom")	Oleg Milyavsky	3:42
3.	"Папа купил автомобиль" ("Papa kupil avtomobil", eng. "Dad bought a car")	Oleg Milyavsky	2:32
4.	"Три желания" ("Tri zhelaniya", eng. "Three wishes")	Diomid Kostyurin	2:50
5.	"Что не может сделать атом" ("Chto ne mozhet sdelat atom", eng. "What an atom can't do")	Woody Guthrie; Tatyana Sikorskaya (Russian lyrics)	3:04

Side two
No.	Title	Lyrics	Length
6.	"Звёздное лето" ("Zvyozdnoye leto, eng. "Starry summer")	Ilya Reznik	4:43
7.	"Ленинград (Памяти Лидии Клемент)" ("Leningrad (In Memory of Lydia Clement)")	Osip Mandelstam	3:08
8.	"Музыкант" ("Muzykant", eng. "Musician")	Osip Mandelstam	2:53
9.	"Поднимись над суетой" ("Podnimis nad suyetoy", eng. "Be Beyond A Fuss Of Life")	Ilya Reznik	4:20
Total length:			29:47

== Charts ==
=== Monthly charts ===
Monthly chart performance for Podnimis nad suyetoy!
Chart (1981)	Peak position
Soviet Albums (Moskovskij Komsomolets)	1

=== Year-end charts ===
Year-end chart performance for Podnimis nad suyetoy!
Chart (1981)	Peak position
Soviet Albums (Moskovskij Komsomolets)	1

== Bibliography ==
- Razzakov, F. (2003). Алла Пугачёва: По ступеням славы [Alla Pugacheva: On the steps of glory] (PDF). Moscow: Eksmo. ISBN 5-8153-0059-4. Archived from the original (PDF) on 2014-02-01.
