= Alexander Tikhanovich =

Soviet-Belarusian pop singer

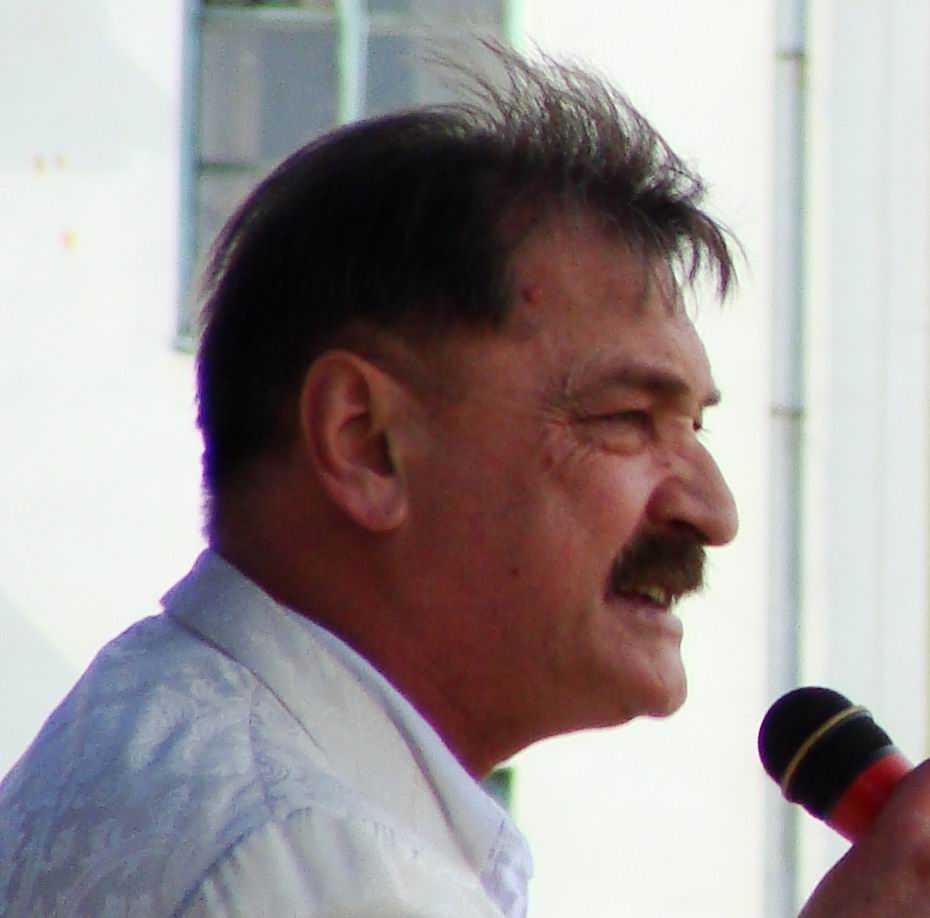
- Born: Alexander Grigorievich Tikhanovich; 13 July 1952; Minsk, Belarusian SSR
- Died: 28 January 2017 (aged 64); Minsk, Belarus
- Occupation: Singer
- Awards: Honored Artist and People's Artist (Belarus)

Alexander Grigorievich Tikhanovich (Belarusian: Аляксандр Рыгоравіч Ціхановіч; 13 July 1952 – 28 January 2017) was a Soviet and Belarusian pop singer, former member of the ensemble Verasy. He was named Honored Artist and People's Artist (Belarus).

From 2006 to 2009, Alexander Tikhanovich headed the national TV music project Eurofest Belarusian selection round for the international Eurovision Song Contest.

== Family ==
Tikhanovich's wife was singer Yadviga Poplavskaya.
