= Atomic Heart 2 =

Upcoming video game

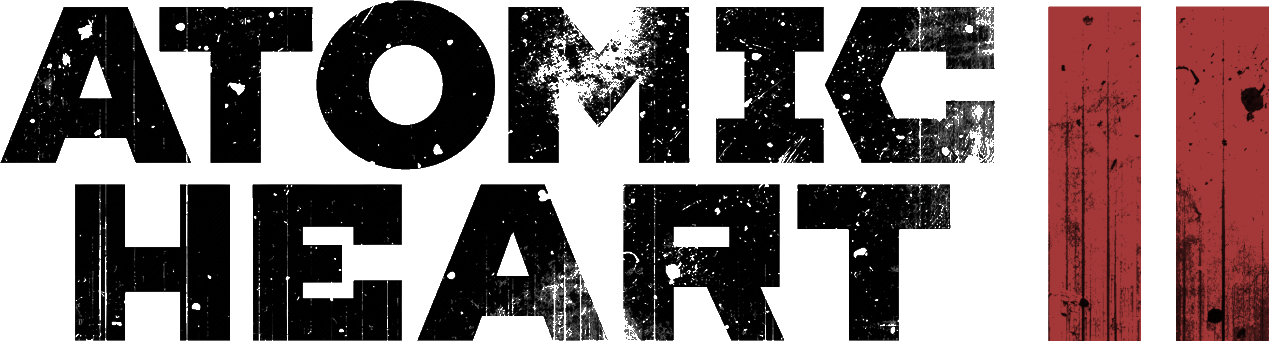
- Developer: Mundfish
- Publisher: Mundfish
- Series: Atomic Heart
- Engine: Unreal Engine 5
- Platforms: PlayStation 5; Windows; Xbox Series X/S
- Genres: Action role-playing, first-person shooter
- Mode: Single-player

Atomic Heart 2 (stylized as Atomic Heart II) is an upcoming action-adventure role-playing video game developed and published by Mundfish. It is the sequel to Atomic Heart and was announced during the Summer Game Fest in June 2025.

== Gameplay ==
Atomic Heart 2 continues the alternate-history setting of its predecessor, where a retrofuturistic Soviet-era aesthetic blends with dystopian sci-fi themes. The sequel expands the scope of the game's world, featuring events on a global scale, compared to the more isolated environments of Atomic Heart.

Atomic Heart 2 is a first-person shooter with role-playing mechanics. It will include deeper role-playing systems, such as skill upgrades and special abilities, alongside a wider variety of weapon customizations and combat strategies. The combat includes both ranged firearms and melee elements, with new robotic enemies and environmental hazards.

== Story ==
The sequel picks up after the events of the first game, with the player navigating a world on the brink of societal collapse. Players are tasked with confronting new threats across various locations and dealing with the consequences of earlier developments in the game's universe.

According to Mundfish, the narrative will explore more diverse geopolitical regions and involve more morally complex themes, including the ethics of artificial intelligence and control.

== Development ==
Plans for a sequel to Atomic Heart were in place as early as 2021, two years before its release. At that time, developers at Mundfish had indicated their interest in expanding the franchise. In June 2023, the studio head confirmed that development on a sequel had begun.

Atomic Heart 2 was formally announced on June 8, 2025, during the Summer Game Fest. Along with the sequel, Mundfish also revealed The Cube, a standalone multiplayer role-playing shooter set in the same universe.

== Release ==
The game is expected to be available on Microsoft Windows, PlayStation 5, and Xbox Series X/S. Gematsu reported that the game was expected to release in 2026.

== Reception ==
Initial coverage from media outlets such as IGN, PC Gamer, and GameSpot highlighted the game's ambitious scale and visual style. While some previews compared it to a blend of genres ranging from BioShock to open world role-playing games, others noted its blend of Soviet aesthetics and speculative fiction themes.
