= Eduard Khanok =

Soviet composer (born 1940)

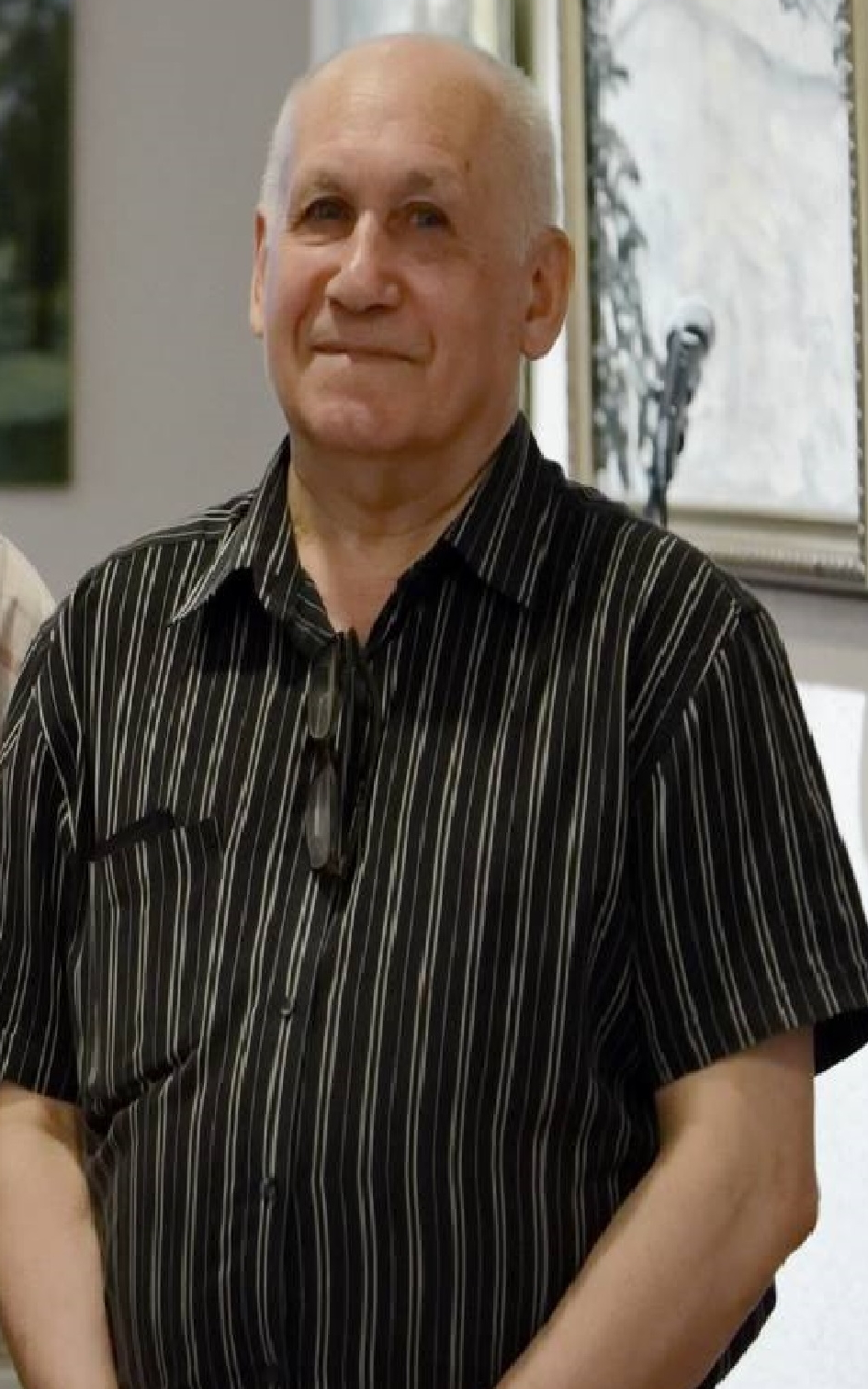
- Eduard Khanok (2006)
- Born: Eduard Semyonovich Khanok; 18 April 1940 (age 85); Kazakh Soviet Socialist Republic, Soviet Union
- Occupation: Composer
- Awards: Lira 2013

Eduard Semyonovich Khanok (Russian: Эдуа́рд Семёнович Хано́к, Belarusian: Эдуард Сямёнавіч Ханок; born 1940) is a Soviet and Belarusian musician and composer. Honored Worker of Culture of the Byelorussian SSR (1982). People's Artist of Belarus (1996).

== Early life and education ==
Born April 18, 1940 in Kazakhstan in a military family. In his childhood, he moved to the city of Brest, where he graduated from high school. In 1962, he graduated from the Minsk State Musical College, in 1969, the Moscow Conservatory, learning in which he wrote his first song. Member of Union of Soviet Composers since 1973.

== Career ==
Khanok has composed music in various genres ranging from vocal-symphonic, chamber-instrumental, chamber-vocal, but most fruitfully in song. From his works the repertoires of ensembles Verasy, Syabry, and Pesnyary were formed. He is the author of popular songs.

== Discography ==
- "White Stork" (Pesnyary)
- "You Shout, Birch" (Syabry)
- "Robin" (Verasy)
- "Conversations" (Maria Pakhomenko)
- "It's Only the Beginning" (Alla Pugacheva)
- "I Live With My Grandmother" (Verasy)
- "You Take Me With You" (Alla Pugacheva)
- "To Serve Russia" (Alexandrov Ensemble)
- "Comic Drill" (Eduard Khil)
- "Tick-So-Words" (Balagan Limited)

== Bibliography ==
- Д.П., В.Б. (2008). "ХАНОК ЭДУАРД (Ханок Эдуард, Khanok Eduard)". Энцыклапедыя беларускай папулярнай музыкі (2000 экз ed.). Мінск: Zmicier Kołas. pp. 318–319. ISBN 978-985-6783-42-8 – via уклад. Дз. Падбярэзскі і інш.
