= Verasy =

Belarusian musical band

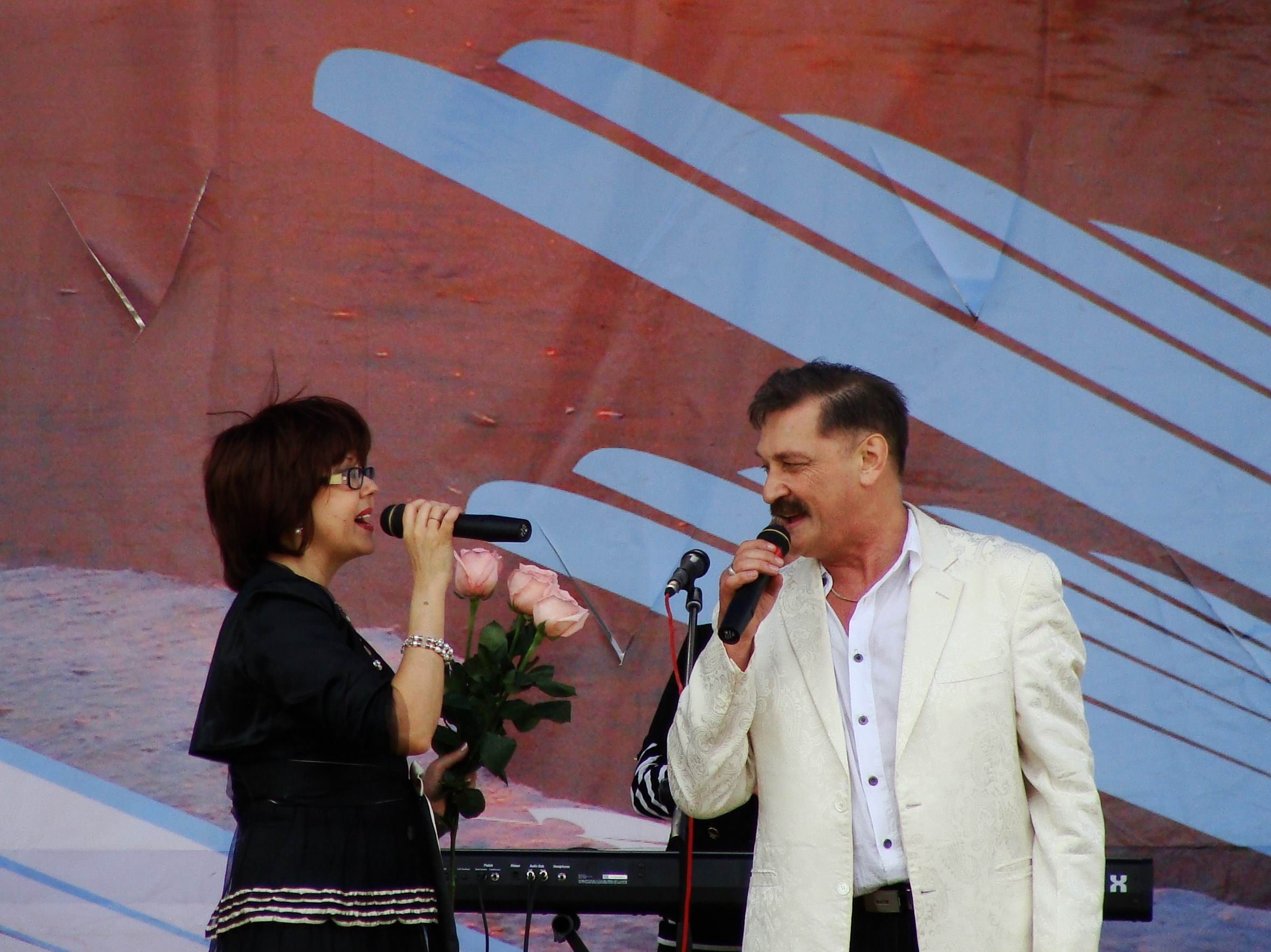
Former Verasy members Alexander Tikhanovich and Yadviga Poplavskaya in 2009

Verasy (Belarusian: Верасы́) was a musical band created in Belarus (then Belarusian SSR, Soviet Union) in 1971. It was created under the Belarusian State Philarmony, Minsk, director and composer Vasily Rainchik. Verasy is Belarusian for heather (see Calluna).

In 2006 Rainchik created a band of the same name.

== Discography ==
- 1975 Where to Find Such Happiness
- 1976 Smells like Chabor
- 1978 White Birch
- 1978 Red Poppies
- 1979 Herbs of Childhood
- 1980 Our Discotheque
- 1980 Robins Hearing a Voice
- 1985 Music for All
