= Maria Pakhomenko =

Maria Pakhomenko Мария Пахоменко
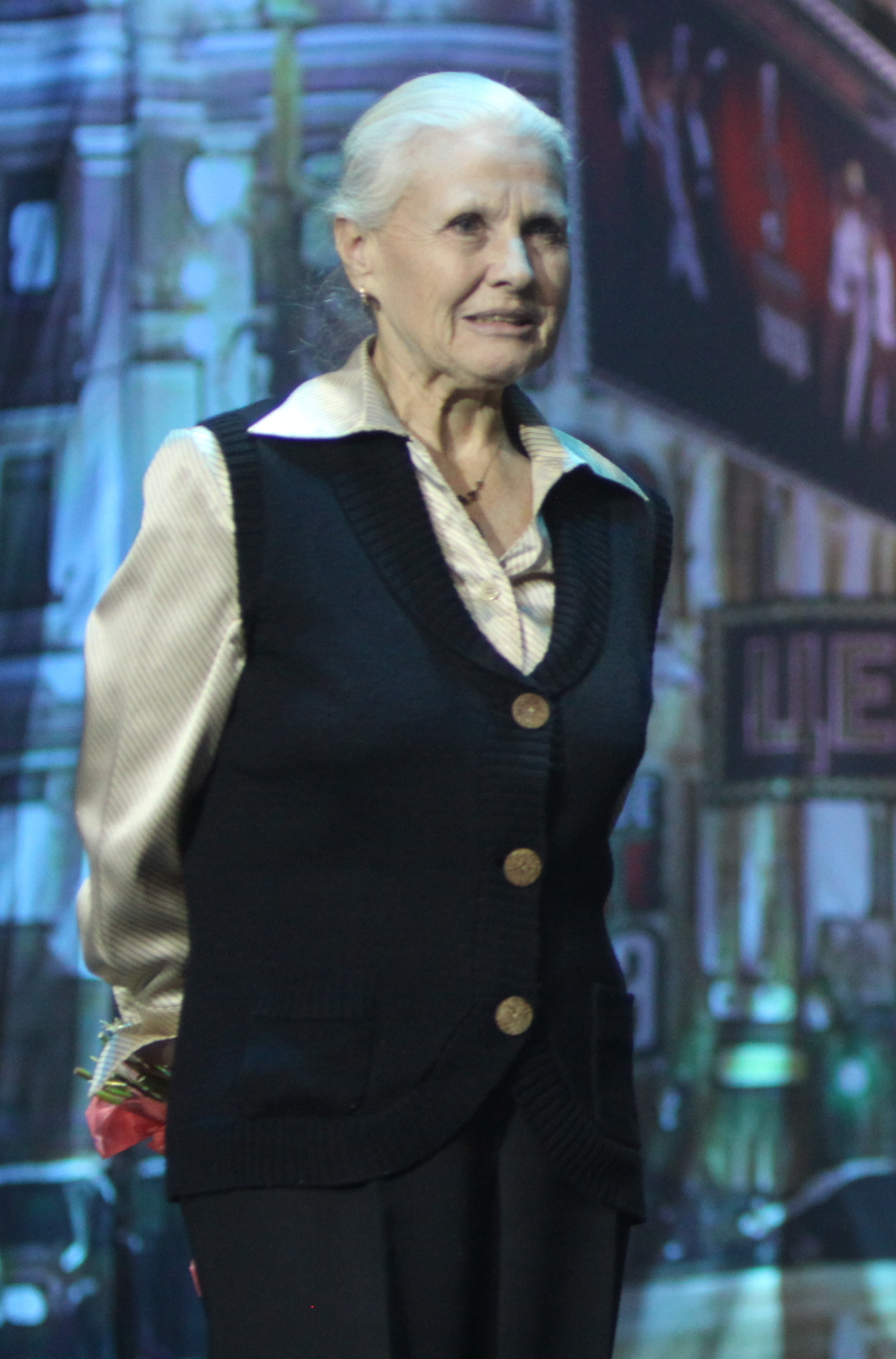
- Pakhomenko in 2009
- Born: Maria Leonidovna Pakhomenko; 25 March 1937; Leningrad, Soviet Union
- Died: 8 March 2013 (aged 75); Saint Petersburg, Russia
- Occupation: Singer
- Years active: 1964–2013
- Title: People's Artist of Russia (1998)
- Awards: Golden Orpheus (Grand Prix,1971)

Maria Leonidovna Pakhomenko (Russian: Мари́я Леони́довна Пахо́менко; 25 March 1937 – 8 March 2013) was a Soviet and Russian singer, a holder of the title of People's Artist of Russia since 1999.

The song that brought her fame was Kachaet, kachaet... (Russian: Качает, качает...) that she recorded for the theater play Idu na Grozu (Russian: Иду на грозу) in 1963. In the 1960s and until the mid-1970s, Maria Pakhomenko was one of the main stars of the Soviet stage. The songs in her performance sounded in the programs of many radio stations and on television. During her career she toured the USSR and abroad, including Yugoslavia and Czechoslovakia.

Among the songs by leading Soviet composers of which she was the original performer are Love Will Stay (by Valery Gavrilin), Nenaglyadnyy Moy (by Aleksandra Pakhmutova), Men (by Eduard Kolmanovsky), Conversations (by Eduard Khanok), Vals pri Svechakh (by Oscar Feltsman), etc.

== Career highlights ==
In 1968, she sold 2,600,000 discs. In 1971, Pakhomenko became the first of Soviet singers to win the Grand Prix at the Golden Orpheus song contest.

Several music films were shot about her, one of which was acquired by 13 countries.

== Discography ==
Singles and EPs

- "Kolker's Songs" (1966)
- "Maria Pakhomenko sings" (1966)
- "Pop Songs" (1966) (feat. Eduard Khil)
- "Waltz by Candlelight" (1970)
- "Conversations" / "Your Letters" (1971)
- "Confession" (1971)
- "Don Quixote / My Beloved" (1971)
- "Let's stand under the rowan tree" (1972)
- "Russian hut" (1973)
- "And have pity on me" (1973)
- "Our favorites" (1973)
- "Leningraders are singing" (1974)
- "White dance" / "With a birch tree nearby" (1974)
- "Our favorites" / "Make no mistake" / "Romance of Lida" (1974)
- "Revelation" / "Why?" (1975)
- "School Waltz" / "Come to us in Saratov" (1977)
- "Song of the first-grader and other songs by Eduard Khanok" (1978)
- "Blue snows" (1981) (feat. Eduard Khil)

Compilations

- 2002 — Names for all times
- 2005 — Love will remain

== See also ==
- Russian pop music
