= Dalidavichy =

Dalidavichy Далідавічы (Belarusian) Далидовичи (Russian)
- Village
- Location within Belarus
- Coordinates: 53°50′55″N 26°41′31″E
- Country: Belarus
- Region: Minsk Region
- District: Valozhyn District

Dalidavichy (Belarusian: Далідавічы, romanized: Dalidavičy; Russian: Далидовичи, romanized: Dalidovichi) is a village in Valozhyn District, Minsk Region, Belarus.
