= Syabry =

Belarusian pop band

Syabry Сябры
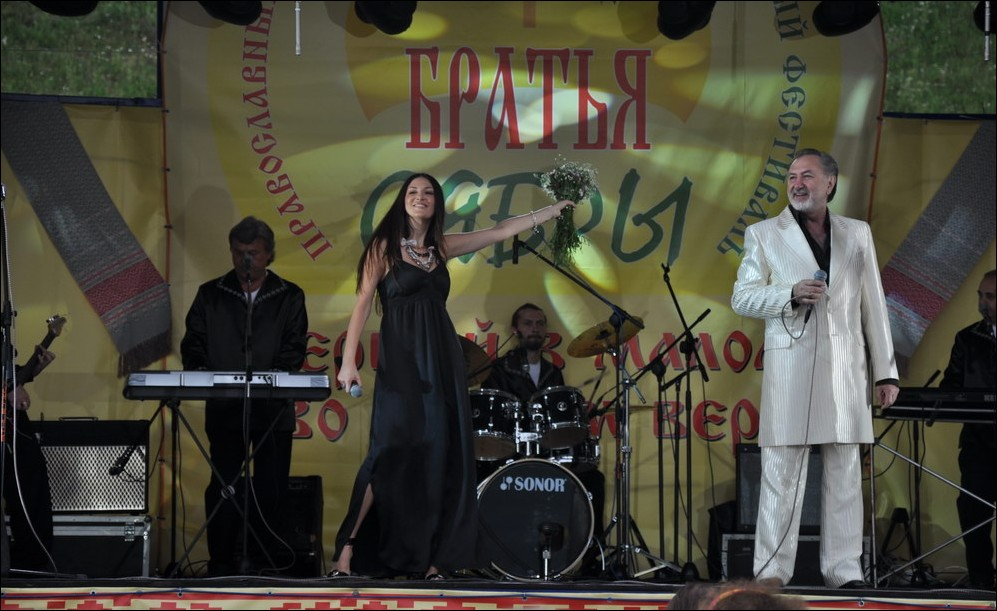

Background information
- Origin: BSSR
- Genres: Folk rock, pop
- Years active: 1974–present
- Label: Melodiya
- Website: syabry.com

Syabry (Belarusian: Сябры, lit. 'Friends') is a Belarusian pop group, established in 1974.

Ensemble Syabry of Anatoly Yarmolenko was created in the early 70s, the first was composed of friends – musicians, graduates of Sokolovsky Gomel Music College. The first victory – the first place in the first national contest entertainers 1974 in Minsk. In the summer of 1975, the management team was invited Valentin Badyarov.

The ensemble was included in the plans of Rosconcert actively toured over the USSR. Performs songs of Russian and Belarusian authors. Most of the songs were written for the ensemble of the Belarusian composer and musical director of the ensemble, Nikolay Satsura.

== Discography ==
- The Best (1995)
- Grand Collection (2004)
- Grand Collection (2009)
