= Ilya Reznik =

Russian poet and songwriter (born 1938)

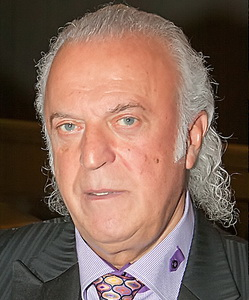
Reznik in 2013

Ilya Rahmielevich Reznik (Russian: Илья Pахмильeвич Peзник; born April 4, 1938) is a Russian poet and songwriter, People's Artist of Russia (2003). Honorary member of the Russian Academy of Arts.

Born in Leningrad, he is the lyricist of popular pop songs to the music of Gennady Gladkov, Maksim Dunayevsky, Alexander Zhurbin, Vladimir Feltsman, Raimonds Pauls and other composers, known by Nikolai Karachentsov, Mikhail Boyarsky, Edita Piekha, Alla Pugacheva, Sofia Rotaru, Tamara Gverdtsiteli, Laima Vaikule, Alexander Gradsky, Eugene Martynov, Irina Ponarovskaya and many others. He wrote texts for parodic Viktor Chistyakov.

In 2013 Reznik was awarded the title People's Artist of Ukraine. In January 2025 he was stripped of this title.

== Biography ==
He was born on 4 April 1938 in Leningrad to a Jewish family. His father, Leopold Iosifovich Izraelson (1916-1944), was a native of Copenhagen, a furrier. Served in Karelia as a member of the 142nd Rifle Division. In August 1941 he was surrounded, listed as missing in action, was severely wounded at the front and died on 15 April 1944. In 1942, Ilya Reznik and his mother Genya Borisovna Izraelson (Evelson, 1914-2001) were evacuated from besieged Leningrad to Sverdlovsk. In 1944, he returned to Leningrad.

After school, he worked as a lab technician at a medical school. In 1958 he entered the Leningrad State Institute of Theatre, Music and Cinema. Graduated in 1962. Since 1965 he has been working in the troupe of the Komissarzhevskaya Theatre. In 1972 he retired from the theatre and engaged only in song poetry.
