= Bank (Icegergert and Zivert song) =

Single by Icegergert and Zivert
- Language: Russian
- Released: October 17, 2025
- Genre: Trap; dance-pop
- Length: 2:57
- Label: GAZ; Sem'ya
- Songwriters: Arkady Kotkov; Icegergert; Zivert; Bogdan Leonovich; Sergey Shabanov

"Bank" (Russian: «Банк») is a song by the Russian rapper Icegergert and the Russian singer Zivert, released as a single on 17 October 2025 by GAZ, an imprint of the Gazgolder label, together with Zivert's label Sem'ya. A boastful track about wealth and partnership set to a danceable instrumental, it became a commercial success, climbing the Russian streaming charts and reaching number one on the Apple Music chart in Ukraine, where its popularity drew criticism. An accompanying music video, directed by Katya Yak, premiered on 12 December 2025.

== Background and release ==
The collaboration originated at the VK Fest festival in Moscow in July 2025, where, during an interview, Icegergert named Zivert as one of the first artists he would like to record a track with. He said that her songs "Zelyonye volny", "Beverly Hills" and "Life" had been in his playlists before he began his own music career. 2025 had been a breakthrough year for Icegergert, who had several singles on the Russian charts, while Zivert had been a fixture of Russian pop since her own rise to fame in 2017. The single was released on 17 October 2025.

== Composition ==
"Bank" is built on a danceable, vogue-styled instrumental, over which Icegergert's rapping is paired with Zivert's vocals. The track draws on quotes from the cult 2000 Russian film Brother 2, and its lyrics revolve around money, luxury and the partnership between the two performers.

== Music video ==
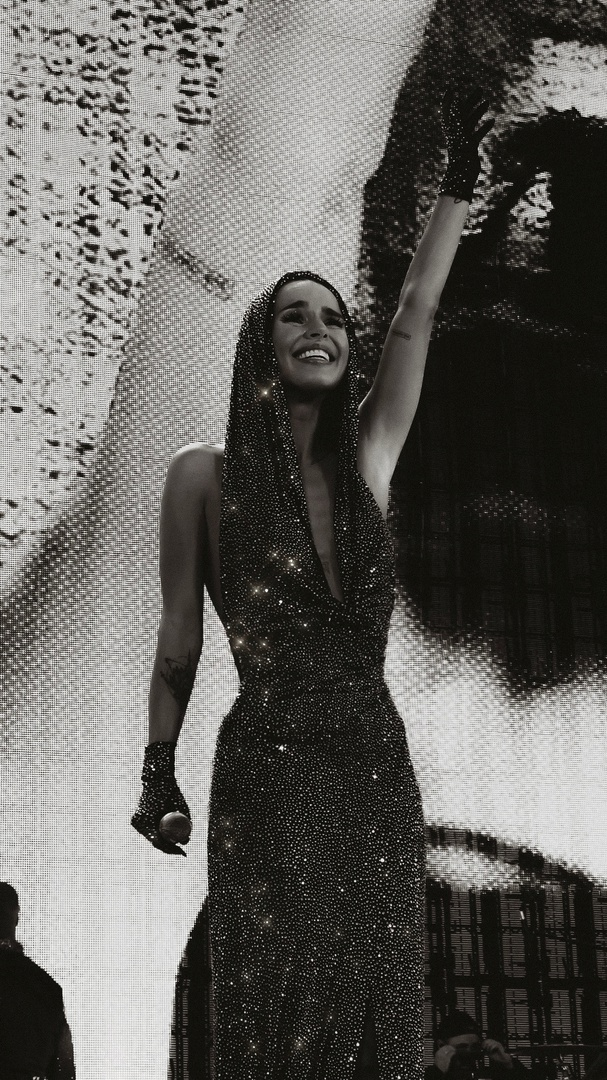
Zivert (pictured at VK Fest in 2023), the featured vocalist; the collaboration began at the festival in 2025.

The music video premiered on 12 December 2025. It was directed by Katya Yak and produced by the studio DropFilm, with Vitaly Sechen as director of photography. The Flow described it as a large-budget production made in a traditional industry style. The clip presents Icegergert and Zivert as a pair of partners who arrive at a luxurious mansion as victors carrying their trophies, styled after the protagonists of crime films.

== Commercial performance ==
The track became a notable streaming hit on platforms operating in Ukraine despite being a Russian-language release by Russian performers. In the Apple Music Ukraine ranking, "Bank" by Icegergert and Zivert took first place, and the fact that a song from the Russian catalogue once again became the most popular in wartime provoked a sharp reaction among Ukrainian musicians. A second Russian song, "Siluet" by Vanya Dmitrienko and Anya Peresild, sat at number ten on the same chart, while the Ukrainian Spotify Top 50 also featured several Russian tracks, including "Overdose" by Tyomny Prints at number three, "Ty che obidelas" by madk1d and Tyomny Prints at number four, and "Martine Rose" by madk1d, greyrock and tewi at number ten, although the Ukrainian song "Smarahdove nebo" by DREVO led the Spotify Ukraine chart at that time.

=== Controversy in Ukraine ===
The chart performance of "Bank" generated public criticism in Ukraine, where the playing and promotion of Russian music has been restricted since the start of the full-scale invasion. The track topping the Apple Music Top 100 Ukraine caused outrage from Ukrainian singer Jerry Heil, who expressed hope that her fans had not contributed to the Russian song's rise to first place in the Ukrainian music chart. Writing on her Telegram channel, Jerry Heil called the situation "surreal", noting that she had just released a socially significant track aimed at supporting demining efforts in Ukraine, and described a Russian artist occupying first place in Ukrainian charts as "disrespect to ourselves".

Ukrainian commentary on the controversy also drew attention to the political stance of the performers. Icegergert and Zivert, whose joint song topped the Ukrainian chart, have maintained a tactic of silence regarding the full-scale invasion, and five years earlier, when Crimea had already been annexed and the war in Donbas was ongoing, Zivert had said that she "had no civic position" and "just wanted peace". The situation in YouTube Music Ukraine was reported as more patriotic, with the top ten held by Ukrainian artists including DREVO, Victoria Niro, Jerry Heil, FIЇNKA, TAYANNA, Anna Trincher, Shugar and Parfeniuk.

The song's prominence on Ukrainian streaming services was framed by Russian outlets as evidence of the limits of Kyiv's cultural policy. Russian newspaper Moskovsky Komsomolets noted that despite the consistent course of the Ukrainian authorities to cleanse the cultural space of products linked to the Russian Federation, songs by Russian musicians regularly appear in the top positions of platforms such as Apple Music and Spotify, and that as far back as 23 June the Ukrainian Agency for Copyright and Related Rights had stated in an official address that the country's citizens continue to actively listen to Russian music online, ignoring Kyiv's attempts to completely exclude Russian-language content.

== Credits and personnel ==
Songwriting credits are adapted from Shazam; music-video credits from the official video.

- Icegergert – vocals, songwriting
- Zivert – vocals, songwriting
- Arkady Kotkov – songwriting
- Bogdan Leonovich – songwriting
- Sergey Shabanov – songwriting
- Katya Yak – music video direction
- Vitaly Sechen – director of photography (music video)
- DropFilm – music video production

== Charts ==
=== Weekly charts ===
2025 weekly chart performance
Chart (2025)	Peak position
Belarus Airplay (TopHit)	187
CIS Airplay (TopHit)	58
Latvia Airplay (TopHit)	48
Latvia Streaming (LaIPA)	3
Moldova Airplay (TopHit)	34
Russia Airplay (TopHit)	40
Russia Streaming (TopHit)	1

2026 weekly chart performance
Chart (2026)	Peak position
Belarus Airplay (TopHit)	170
CIS Airplay (TopHit)	67
Latvia Airplay (TopHit)	3
Latvia Streaming (LaIPA)	6
Moldova Airplay (TopHit)	29
Russia Airplay (TopHit)	50
Russia Streaming (TopHit)	1

=== Monthly charts ===
2025 monthly chart performance
Chart (2025)	Peak position
CIS Airplay (TopHit)	64
Latvia Airplay (TopHit)	48
Moldova Airplay (TopHit)	54
Russia Airplay (TopHit)	44
Russia Streaming (TopHit)	1

2026 monthly chart performance
Chart (2026)	Peak position
CIS Airplay (TopHit)	80
Latvia Airplay (TopHit)	4
Moldova Airplay (TopHit)	49
Russia Airplay (TopHit)	57
Russia Streaming (TopHit)	2

=== Year-end charts ===
2025 year-end chart performance
Chart (2025)	Position
Russia Streaming (TopHit)	95

== Release history ==
Region	Date	Format	Label	Ref.
Various	17 October 2025	Digital download; streaming	GAZ; Sem'ya	
