= YATL =

Single by Zivert

from the album Vinyl #2
- Language: Russian
- English title: ILY
- Released: February 14, 2020
- Genre: Pop
- Length: 3:43
- Label: Pervoye muzykalnoye

Zivert singles chronology
"Credo" (2019)	"YATL" (2020)	"Fly 2" (2020)

"YATL" (Russian: ЯТЛ, abbreviation of «Я тебя люблю») is the single by Russian pop singer Zivert, being the last 12th song on the album Vinyl #2, released on 8 October 2021. It was released on 14 February 2020 through the label Pervoye muzykalnoye.

It was released on Valentine's Day and dedicated to all lovers.

== History ==
A few days before the song's release, in the VK group, Zivert published a survey, in which she asked fans what they were waiting for more: new track or music video for the song "Credo".

On 3 November 2020, Zivert sang the song during the LAB music show with Russian musician Anton Belyaev for Yandex.Ether. The singles "Neboley" and "YATL" in 2020 not only "solidifies the singer in the highest league in Russia", but also made her the most popular on the Yandex service "Ask Alice".

== Music video ==
The official release of the music video for the track was on 14 February, the day the song was released. The directors for the video were Alan Badoev and Ganna Bogdan, who spent one and a half months filming the video in Los Angeles.

== Charts ==
=== Weekly charts ===
2020 weekly chart performance
Chart (2020)	Peak position
Bulgaria Airplay (PROPHON)	2
CIS Airplay (TopHit)	1
Russia Airplay (TopHit)	1
Ukraine Airplay (FDR)	7
Ukraine Airplay (TopHit)	17
Ukraine Dance Airplay (FDR)	8

2021 weekly chart performance
Chart (2021)	Peak position
CIS Airplay (TopHit)	50
Russia Airplay (TopHit)	42
Ukraine Airplay (TopHit)	139

2022 weekly chart performance
Chart (2022)	Peak position
CIS Airplay (TopHit)	131
Russia Airplay (TopHit)	111

2023 weekly chart performance
Chart (2023)	Peak position
CIS Airplay (TopHit)	183
Lithuania Airplay (TopHit)	179
Moldova Airplay (TopHit)	48
Russia Airplay (TopHit)	109

2024 weekly chart performance
Chart (2024)	Peak position
Kazakhstan Airplay (TopHit)	69
Moldova Airplay (TopHit)	180

2025 weekly chart performance
Chart (2025)	Peak position
Kazakhstan Airplay (TopHit)	61
Russia Airplay (TopHit)	182

2026 weekly chart performance
Chart (2026)	Peak position
Kazakhstan Airplay (TopHit)	140
Russia Airplay (TopHit)	170

=== Monthly charts ===
2020 monthly chart performance
Chart (2020)	Peak position
CIS Airplay (TopHit)	1
Latvia Airplay (LaIPA)	51
Russia Airplay (TopHit)	1
Ukraine Airplay (TopHit)	19

2021 monthly chart performance
Chart (2021)	Peak position
CIS Airplay (TopHit)	63
Russia Airplay (TopHit)	59

2023 monthly chart performance
Chart (2023)	Peak position
Moldova Airplay (TopHit)	67

=== Year-end charts ===
2020 year-end chart performance
Chart (2020)	Peak position
CIS Airplay (TopHit)	5
Russia Airplay (TopHit)	3
Ukraine Airplay (TopHit)	57

2021 year-end chart performance
Chart (2021)	Peak position
CIS Airplay (TopHit)	117
Russia Airplay (TopHit)	123

2022 year-end chart performance
Chart (2022)	Peak position
Russia Airplay (TopHit)	187

2023 year-end chart performance
Chart (2023)	Peak position
Moldova Airplay (TopHit)	157

=== Decade-end charts ===
Chart (2020–2026)	Position
CIS Airplay (TopHit)	35
Kazakhstan Airplay (TopHit)	4
Moldova Airplay (TopHit)	118
Russia Airplay (TopHit)	8

== Awards and nominations ==
Award	Year	Category	Result	Ref.
Zhara Music Awards	2020	Song of the Year	Won	
