= Zivert =

Russian singer

- Зиверт
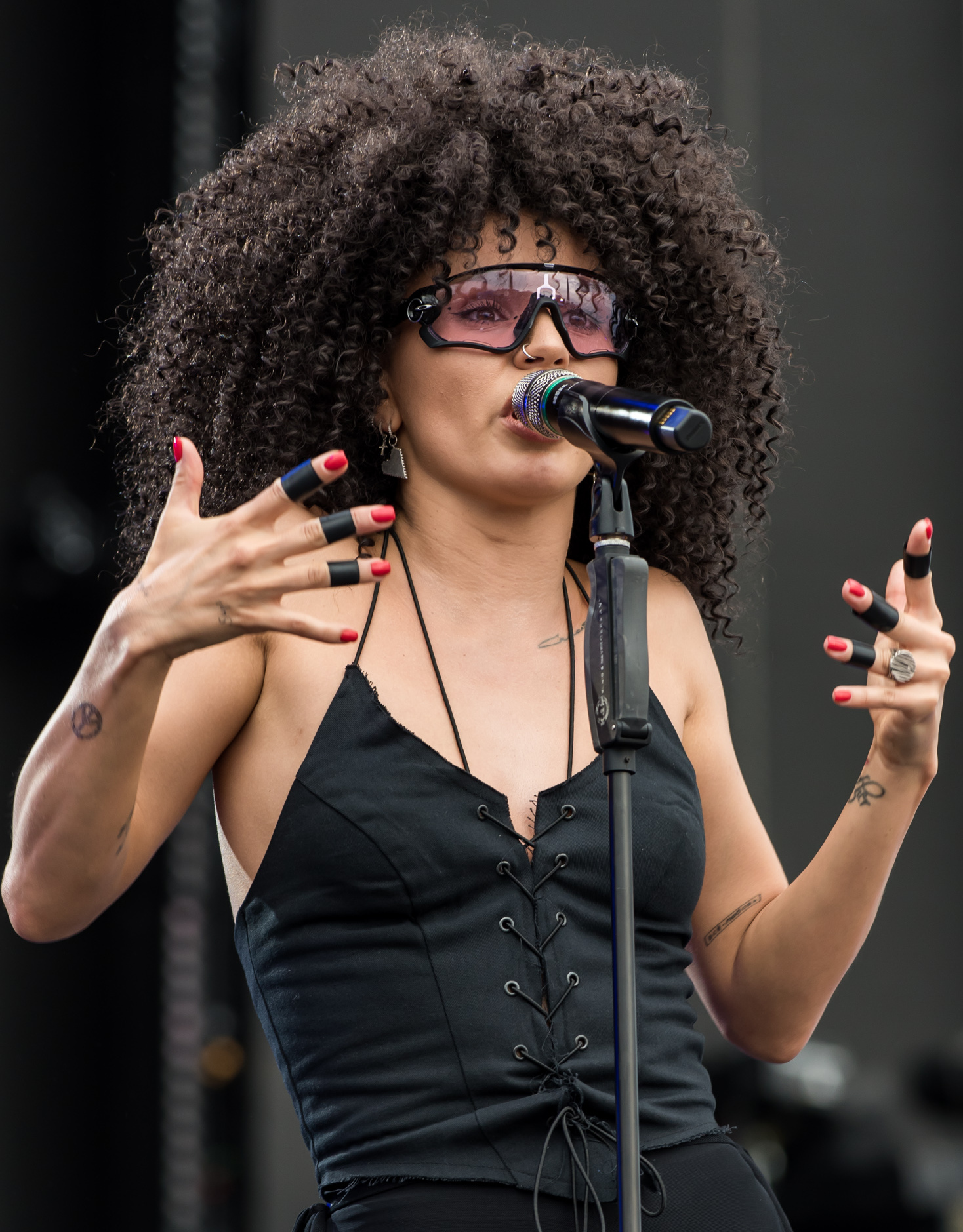
- Zivert in 2022
- Born: Yulia Dmitrievna Sytnik; 28 November 1990 (age 35); Moscow, Soviet Union
- Other name: Yulia Dmitrievna Zivert
- Occupations: Singer; songwriter; model
- Years active: 2017–present
- Awards: Full list
- Musical career
- Genres: Pop; dance-pop
- Instrument: Vocals
- Labels: Pervoye muzykalnoye; Sem'ya
- Website: zivert.com

Yulia Dmitrievna Zivert (Russian: Юлия Дмитриевна Зиверт, born as Yulia Dmitrievna Sytnik (Russian: Юлия Дмитриевна Сытник); 28 November 1990), known professionally as Zivert, is a Russian singer, songwriter and model.

Her career started in 2017 after she released first singles "Chak" and "Anestesia". She gained international fame in 2018 with her single "Life". Zivert's most known singles includes "Life" (2018), "YATL" (2020), "Mnogotochiya" (2020) and "Egoistka" (2024).

She has served as a coach on the television singing competition The Voice Russia (2024).

== Early life and career ==
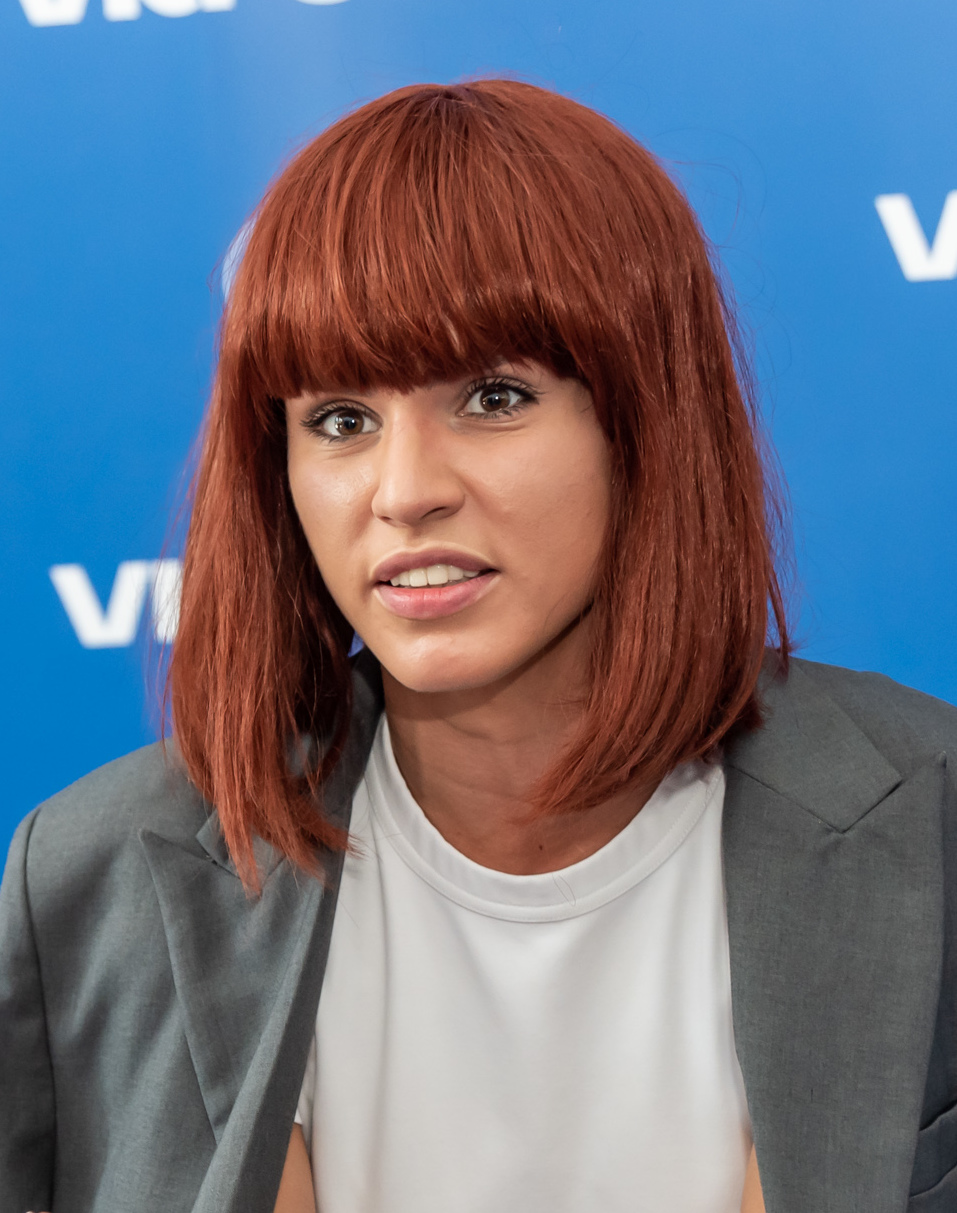
Zivert during press conference at VK Fest 5 (2019)

Yulia Dmitrievna Zivert was born on 28 November 1990 in Moscow. During her childhood, she has lived for a five years in Odesa, Ukraine. Her father is of Ukrainian and Romani descent, while her mother, who is originally from Petropavlovsk-Kamchatsky, is of German and Polish descent. She described music as her childhood dream since she used to make home concerts almost every day. From 2022 to 2023 she lived in Bali, Indonesia.

In 2017, Zivert signed with the record label Pervoye muzykalnoye. Her debut single called "Chak" was released in her YouTube channel on 1 April 2017. Her second single "Anestesia" was released on 15 September the same year with video being released on 17 January 2018. On 6 April 2018 the singer released her first extended play, titled Siyay. A total of 4 tracks were included: "Yeshcho khochu", "Zelenyye volny", "Siyay" and "Okean".

On 12 March 2019, a music video for the song "Life", was premiered on YouTube. It became the second most searched single in Russia on Shazam in 2019, took the first line of the most popular tracks of 2019 according to Yandex Music and second place in the ranking of the most listened tracks in Russia according to Apple Music. The video was filmed in Hong Kong.

In September 2019, she released her debut album Vinyl #1; since then, the singer has gone on to release multiple hit singles.

On 3 February 2020, Russian media reported that Zivert was shortlisted for Russia's internal selection for the Eurovision Song Contest 2020, later apparently finishing second behind Little Big. On 24 February, although she chose not to comment directly on whether the reports were true, the singer admitted that she was pleased to hear that Russian broadcaster was considering her name and stated that she was ready to cancel gigs in order to compete in 2020 if she got selected. In 2021, Zivert was one of nine artists rumoured to be shortlisted acts for Russia's selection for the Eurovision Song Contest 2021, but ultimately was not chosen for the televised final.

== Discography ==
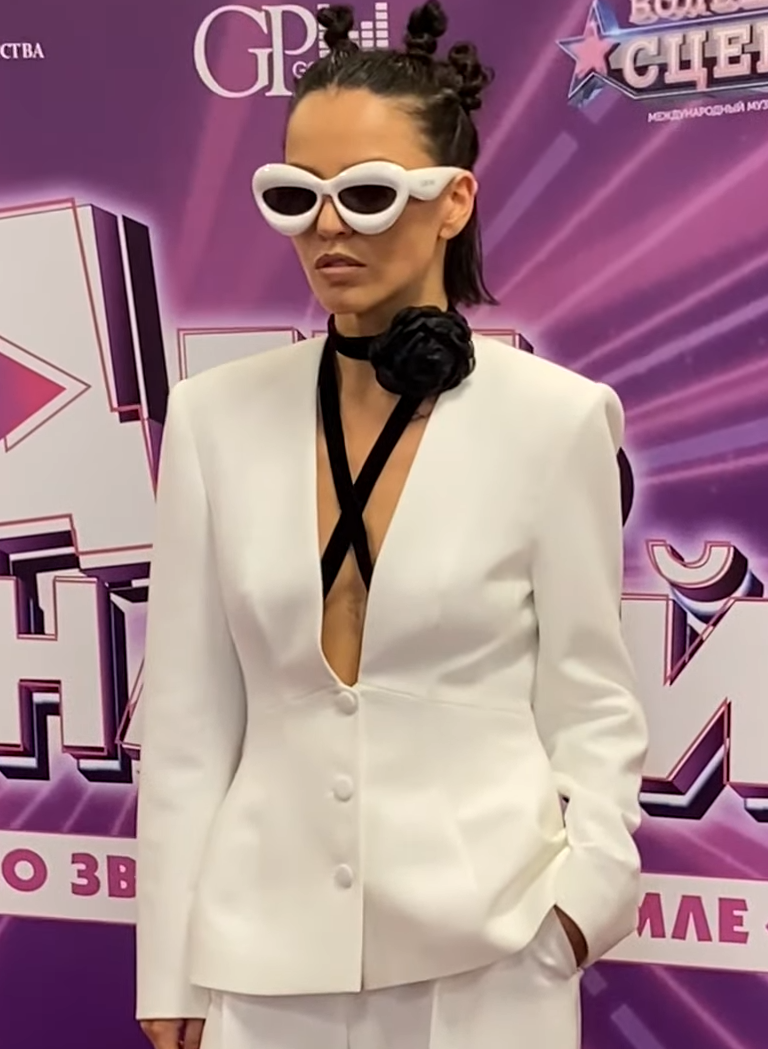
Zivert attending Bolshaya Scena Music Festival on 2 September 2023

=== Studio albums ===
List of studio albums, with selected details
Title	Details	Peak chart positions		
Title	Details	EST	LAT	LTU
Vinyl #1	Released: 27 September 2019; Label: Pervoye muzykalnoye; Format: Digital download, streaming	30	9	12
Vinyl #2	Released: 8 October 2021; Label: Pervoye muzykalnoye; Format: Digital download, streaming	*	*	20
V mire vesolykh	Released: 27 October 2023; Label: Sem'ya; Format: Digital download, streaming	*	—	—
"—" denotes items which were not released in that country or failed to chart. "*" denotes that the chart did not exist at that time.

=== Extended plays ===
List of EPs, with selected details
Title	Details
Siyay	Released: 6 April 2018; Label: Pervoye muzykalnoye; Formats: Digital download, streaming
Apple Music Home Session: Zivert	Released: 28 January 2022; Label: Pervoye muzykalnoye, Sem'ya; Formats: Digital download, streaming
Zima	Released: 16 December 2022; Label: Pervoye muzykalnoye, Sem'ya; Formats: Digital download, streaming

=== Singles ===
==== As lead artist: 2017–2021 ====
List of singles released from 2017 to 2021 as lead artist, showing year released, chart positions and album name
Title	Year	Peak chart positions													Album or EP
Title	Year	RUS Air.	RUS Stream.	BLR Air.	BUL Air.	CIS Air.	GRE Int. Air.	KAZ Air.	LAT Air. (Note: Latvian Music Producers Association began publishing monthly Airplay charts in November 2019 and their charts are taken into consideration for Latvian Airplay peaks from November 2019 to March 2021. No charts were published by LaIPA from March 2021 to January 2023, but as they confirm to use Radiomonitor data from January 2023, the additional unavailable peaks from before this period are also from Radiomonitor data, used until January 2023 when both LaIPA and TopHit began publishing Latvian Airplay charts. Since none of Zivert's singles from January 2023 peaked at LaIPA chart, but multiple songs peaked on TopHit, from that date only TopHit is taken into consideration.)	LAT Stream.	LTU	LTU Air.	MDA Air.	UKR Air. (Note: Since both FDR Media and TopHit are official airplay chart providers in Ukraine, in the peaks list, it is taken into consideration on which list a given song has been ranked higher.)	Album or EP
"Chak"	2017	—	*	*	—	—	—	*	—	*	*			—	Non-album singles
"Anesteziya"	2017	—	*	*	—	—	—	*	—	*	*			—	Non-album singles
"Zelyonye volny"	2018	10	*	*	—	21	—	73	*	*	—	178	179	167	Siyay
"Life"	2018	17	*	101	2	19	15	53	20	45	—	7	126	23	Vinyl #1
"Mozhno vso"	2018	—	*	*	—	—	—	*	—	—	—	*		—	Non-album single
"Sharik"	2019	—	*	*	—	—	—	*	—	—	—	*		—	Vinyl #1
"Parusa" (with Mot)	2019	45	*	*	—	47	—	54	—	—	—	*		—	Non-album single
"Beverly Hills"	2019	25	96	*	2	27	—	11	180	89	—	170	58	19	Vinyl #1
"Credo"	2019	1	*	*	—	1	—	32	57	—	—	*	60	7	Vinyl #1
"YATL"	2020	1	*	*	2	1	—	61	51	*	—	*	48	7	Vinyl #2
"Fly 2" (featuring Niletto)	2020	30	*	*	—	34	—	*	14	*	—	*	*	51	Non-album singles
"Neboley" (with Basta)	2020	84	*	*	—	74	—	*	20	*	—	*	65	10	Non-album singles
"Mnogotochiya"	2020	1	*	*	4	1	—	*	19	*	—	95	*	27	Vinyl #2
"Bestseller" (with Max Barskih)	2021	2	*	*	3	5	—	43	—	*	98	*	*	11	Non-album single
"Rokki"	2021	18	*	*	—	24	—	75	17	*	—	*	*	—	Vinyl #2
"Del Mar"	2021	46	*	*	—	58	—	*	—	*	—	*	*	22	Vinyl #2
"Tebe"	2021	—	*	*	—	—	—	*	—	*	—	*	*	—	Vinyl #2
"Eto byla lyubov'" (with Dima Bilan)	2021	20	*	*	—	24	—	104	—	*	—	*	135	—	13 druzey Bilana
"—" denotes items which were not released in that country or failed to chart. "*" denotes that the chart did not exist at that time.

==== As lead artist: since 2022 ====
List of singles released since 2022 as lead artist, showing year released, chart positions and album name
Title	Year	Peak chart positions										Album or EP
Title	Year	RUS Air.	RUS Stream.	BLR Air.	CIS Air.	EST Air.	KAZ Air.	LAT Air.	LAT Stream.	LTU Air.	MDA Air.	Album or EP
"AstaLaVistaLove"	2022	—	*	*	—	*	*	—	*	*		Non-album single
"Vydychaj" (with Tri dnya dozhdya)	2022	—	*	*	—	*	*	—	*	*		Baypolar
"Posle menya" (with Lyriq)	2022	—	*	*	—	*	*	—	*	*		Non-album singles
"Wake Up!"	2022	5	*	47	12	*	26	—	*	*		Non-album singles
"Smekh i grekh"	2022	—	*	*	—	*	*	16	*	*		Non-album singles
"Vso resheno"	2022	—	*	*	—	*	*	—	*	63	94	Non-album singles
"Zalipatel'no" (with Pizza)	2023	50	*	—	65	44	—	20	—	70	69	Non-album singles
"Nedostatochno" (with Ruki Vverh!)	2023	50	*	—	72	17	40	7	—	—	—	Non-album singles
"Spichki" (with Antoha MC)	2023	—	*	—	—	—	—	—	—	—	—	Non-album singles
"Beri i begi"	2023	4	*	48	7	13	4	25	—	8	105	V mire vesolykh
"Mutki"	2024	9	*	59	20	79	29	19	—	52	49	Non-album singles
"Yeda nevkusnaya" (with Ochki i Koltsa)	2024	164	*	56	—	—	117	59	—	—	—	Non-album singles
"Egoistka"	2024	1	20	24	5	27	1	30	—	34	3	Non-album singles
"Kavaler-Revol'ver"	2025	106	82	—	191	—	72	77	—	3	—	Non-album singles
"Odin protsent"	2025	5	19	25	12	190	9	25	—	4	4	Non-album singles
"Gudbay"	2025	5	33	52	13	190	27	24	—	31	5	Non-album singles
"Bank" (with Icegergert)	2025	40	1	170	58	—	—	3	3	—	29	Non-album singles
"Slyozy" (with Vonamour, Ochki i Koltsa and Detsl)	2026	—	48	—	—	—	75	5	—	—	—	Non-album singles
"Gaz"	2026	25	1	14	28	157	37	1	—	—	32	Non-album singles
"Davay na samyy verkh" (with Ever and Directoreels)	2026	43	14	82	53	—	7	129	—	—	—	Non-album singles
"Ne svyataya"	2026	43	20	—	61	—	—	—	—	—	—	Non-album singles
"—" denotes items which were not released in that country or failed to chart. "*" denotes that the chart did not exist at that time.

==== As featured artist ====
List of singles as featured artist, showing year released and album name
Title	Year	Album or EP
"Tekhno" (2 Lyama featuring Zivert)	2018	Nachalo

=== Promotional singles ===
List of promotional singles as lead artist, showing year released, chart positions and album name
Title	Year	Peak chart positions						Album or EP
Title	Year	RUS Air.	CIS Air.	LAT Air.	LTU Air.	MDA Air.	UKR Air.	Album or EP
"Veter peremen"	2017	—	—	—	—	*	—	Chernobyl 2. Zone of Exclusion (soundtrack)
"Yeshcho khochu"	2018	—	—	—	192	*	174	Siyay
"Crazy"	2019	—	—	—	—	*	—	Non-album singles
"Fly 3" (New Year's Eve version of Fly 2)	2020	—	—	—	—	*	—	Non-album singles
"Cry"	2021	19	28	—	—	*	—	Vinyl #2
"Kaby ne bylo zimy" (featuring Lyriq)	2021	—	—	—	—	*	—	Non-album singles
"Tvori dobro" (with Therr Maitz)	2023	—	—	—	—	—	—	Non-album singles
"V gorode leto"	2026	—	—	20	—	100	—	Non-album singles
"—" denotes items which were not released in that country or failed to chart. "*" denotes that the chart did not exist at that time.

=== Other charted songs ===
List of other charted songs as lead artist, showing year released, chart positions and album name
Title	Year	Peak chart positions				Album or EP
Title	Year	RUS Air.	CIS Air.	LTU Air.	UKR Air.	Album or EP
"Life" (Lavrushkin & Mephisto Remix)	2018	35	34	*	31	Non-album songs
"Forever Young" (Kapral Remix) (with Lyriq)	2021	—	—	19	—	Non-album songs
"Schastye"	2023	—	—	51	—	V mire vesolykh
"Nad kryshami"	2023	—	—	19	—	V mire vesolykh
"—" denotes items which were not released in that country or failed to chart. "*" denotes that the chart did not exist at that time.

=== Music videos ===
Year	Title	Director	Album
2017	"Chak"	Bogdan Leonovic	Non-album singles
2017	"Anesteziya"	Serghey Grey	Non-album singles
2018	"Yeshcho khochu"	Yaroslav Korotkov	Siyay
2018	"Zelyonye Volny"	Yaroslav Korotkov	Siyay
2019	"Life"	Yaroslav Korotkov	Vinyl #1
2019	"Parusa" (with Mot)	Yaroslav Korotkov	Non-album single
2019	"Beverly Hills"	Alan Badoev	Vinyl #1
2020	"YATL"	Alan Badoev and Ganna Bogdan	Vinyl #2
2020	"Credo"	Alan Badoev	Vinyl #1
2020	"Fly 2" (featuring Niletto)	Unknown	Non-album singles
2020	"Neboley" (with Basta)	Alexei Kipriyanov	Non-album singles
2020	"Mnogotochiya"	Alexei Kipriyanov	Vinyl #2
2021	"Bestseller" (with Max Barskih)	Alan Badoev	Non-album single
2021	"Eto byla lyubov'" (with Dima Bilan)	Alexei Kipriyanov	13 druzey Bilana
2021	"Cry"	Alan Badoev	Vinyl #2
2022	"Tri dnya lyubvi"	Alexei Kipriyanov	Vinyl #2
2022	"Vydychaj" (with Tri dnya dozhdya)	Aibat Rahmanov	Baypolar
2022	"Wake Up!"	Alexei Kipriyanov	Non-album singles
2023	"Zalipatel'no" (with Pizza)	Alexei Kipriyanov	Non-album singles
2023	"Beri i begi"	Alexei Kipriyanov	V mire vesolykh
2023	"Mutki"	Sasha Lee	Non-album single
2024	"Schast'ye"	Unknown	V mire vesolykh
2025	"Egoistka"	Kate Yak	Non-album single

== Awards and nominations ==
Year	Award	Recipient(s) and nominee(s)	Category	Result	Ref.
2019	Muz TV Award	Zivert	Best album	Nominated	
2019	Muz TV Award	Zivert	Breakthrough of the Year	Won	
2019	RU.TV Awards	Zivert	Powerful start	Won	
2019	RU.TV Awards	Zivert	Cosmopolitan Choice	Won	
2019	Russian National Music Award "Victoria"	"Life"	Best Pop Artist	Won	
2019	Russian National Music Award "Victoria"	Zivert	Discovery of the year	Won	
2019	Russian National Music Award "Victoria"	"Life"	Song of the year	Won	
2019	Russian National Music Award "Victoria"	"Beverly Hills"	Dance hit of the year	Nominated	
2020	"New Radio Awards"	Zivert	Best Female Artist	Won	
2020	"New Radio Awards"	Zivert	Breakthrough of the Year	Won	
2020	"New Radio Awards"	"Life"	Single of the year	Won	
2020	Zhara Music Awards	Zivert	Female Singer of the Year	Pending	
2020	Zhara Music Awards	Zivert	Collaboration of the Year	Pending	
2020	Zhara Music Awards	Zivert	Connection of Generations	Pending	
2020	Zhara Music Awards	"Beverly Hills"	Music Video of the Year	Pending	
2021	"TopHit Music Awards"	Zivert	Best Solo Artist	Won	
2021	RU.TV Awards	Max Barskih & Zivert - "Bestseller"	Best duet	Nominated	
2021	RU.TV Awards	Zivert	Best Female Singer	Won	
2021	Muz-TV Awards	"Credo"	Best Song	Nominated	
2021	Muz-TV Awards	"Beverly Hills"	Best Music Video	Nominated	
2021	Muz-TV Awards	Баста & Zivert: "неболей"	Best collaboration	Nominated	
2021	Muz-TV Awards	"Vinyl #1"	Best Album	Nominated	
2021	Muz-TV Awards	Zivert	Best Female Artist	Won	
