= Fly 2 (song) =

2020 song by Zivert & Niletto

Single by Zivert featuring Niletto
- Language: English, Russian
- Released: May 22, 2020
- Genre: Pop

Zivert featuring Niletto singles chronology
"YATL" (2020)	"Fly 2" (2020)	"Neboley" (2020)

"Fly 2" is a single by Russian pop singer Zivert featuring Russian singer Niletto, released on 22 May 2020 through the labels Pervoye muzykalnoye and Zion Music. The track is a remake of Zivert's song "Fly".

== History ==
"Fly 2" is a remake of one of Zivert's songs on her debut studio album Vinyl #1 "Fly". According to the singer, the song "Fly" listeners misunderstood and underestimated, that & served as a more refined remix, which has a new retro-sound done in the once-fashionable style of UK garage.

== Charts ==
=== Weekly charts ===
Weekly chart performance for "Fly 2"
Chart (2020)	Peak position
CIS Airplay (TopHit)	34
Latvia Airplay (Radiomonitor)	14
Russia Airplay (TopHit)	30
Ukraine Airplay (TopHit)	51

=== Monthly charts ===
Monthly chart performance for "Fly 2"
Chart (2020)	Peak position
CIS Airplay (TopHit)	34
Latvia Airplay (LaIPA)	67
Russia Airplay (TopHit)	33
Ukraine Airplay (TopHit)	66

=== Year-end charts ===
2020 year-end chart performance for "Fly 2"
Chart (2020)	Position
CIS Airplay (TopHit)	154
Russia Airplay (TopHit)	173
