= Mnogotochiya =

Single by Zivert

from the album Vinyl #2
- Language: Russian
- English title: Mnogotochiya
- Released: October 16, 2020
- Genre: Pop
- Length: 3:27
- Label: Pervoye muzykalnoye

Zivert singles chronology
"Neboley" (2020)	"Mnogotochiya" (2020)	"Bestseller" (2021)

"Mnogotochiya" (Russian: Многоточия; English: Ellipses) is a song by Russian pop-singer Zivert, released on 16 October 2020 as a single through the label Pervoye muzykalnoye. The song by Zivert describes a relationship that reaches an impasse. They hurt both partners.

== History ==
According to the site TNT Music, Zivert posted the poem in her song on her Instagram account in April 2018.

A week and a half before the single was released, the singer released a teaser. It's visuals included inserts from the melodrama Adrian Lyne "9 1/2 weeks", where it featured Mickey Rourke & Kim Basinger.

== Music video ==
The music video for the song was officially released on 26 November 2020 on Zivert's YouTube channel. In it, the singer works as a waitress in a restaurant called "Любовь". Every day at work, she watches couples fall in love. Later she breaks down and steals the heart-shaped figure, thanks to which she later finds love. But then the heart begins to grow and consumes the performer. The director of the video was Aleksei Kupriyanov, who directed the singer's previous video "Neboley".

== Charts ==
=== Weekly charts ===
2020 weekly chart performance
Chart (2020)	Peak position
CIS Airplay (TopHit)	1
Latvia Airplay (Radiomonitor)	19
Russia Airplay (TopHit)	1

2021 weekly chart performance
Chart (2021)	Peak position
Bulgaria Airplay (PROPHON)	4
CIS Airplay (TopHit)	1
Russia Airplay (TopHit)	1
Ukraine Airplay (FDR)	27
Ukraine Airplay (TopHit)	39

2023 weekly chart performance
Chart (2023)	Peak position
Lithuania Airplay (TopHit)	95

=== Monthly charts ===
2020 monthly chart performance
Chart (2020)	Peak position
CIS Airplay (TopHit)	1
Russia Airplay (TopHit)	1

2021 monthly chart performance
Chart (2021)	Peak position
CIS Airplay (TopHit)	1
Russia Airplay (TopHit)	1
Ukraine Airplay (TopHit)	42

=== Year-end charts ===
2020 year-end chart performance
Chart (2020)	Peak position
CIS Airplay (TopHit)	122
Russia Airplay (TopHit)	110

2021 year-end chart performance
Chart (2021)	Peak position
CIS Airplay (TopHit)	34
Russia Airplay (TopHit)	25
Ukraine Airplay (TopHit)	128

2023 year-end chart performance
Chart (2023)	Peak position
Lithuania Airplay (TopHit)	190

=== Decade-end charts ===
Chart (2020–2026)	Position
CIS Airplay (TopHit)	88
Russia Airplay (TopHit)	27
