= Tetiana Omelchenko (dancer) =

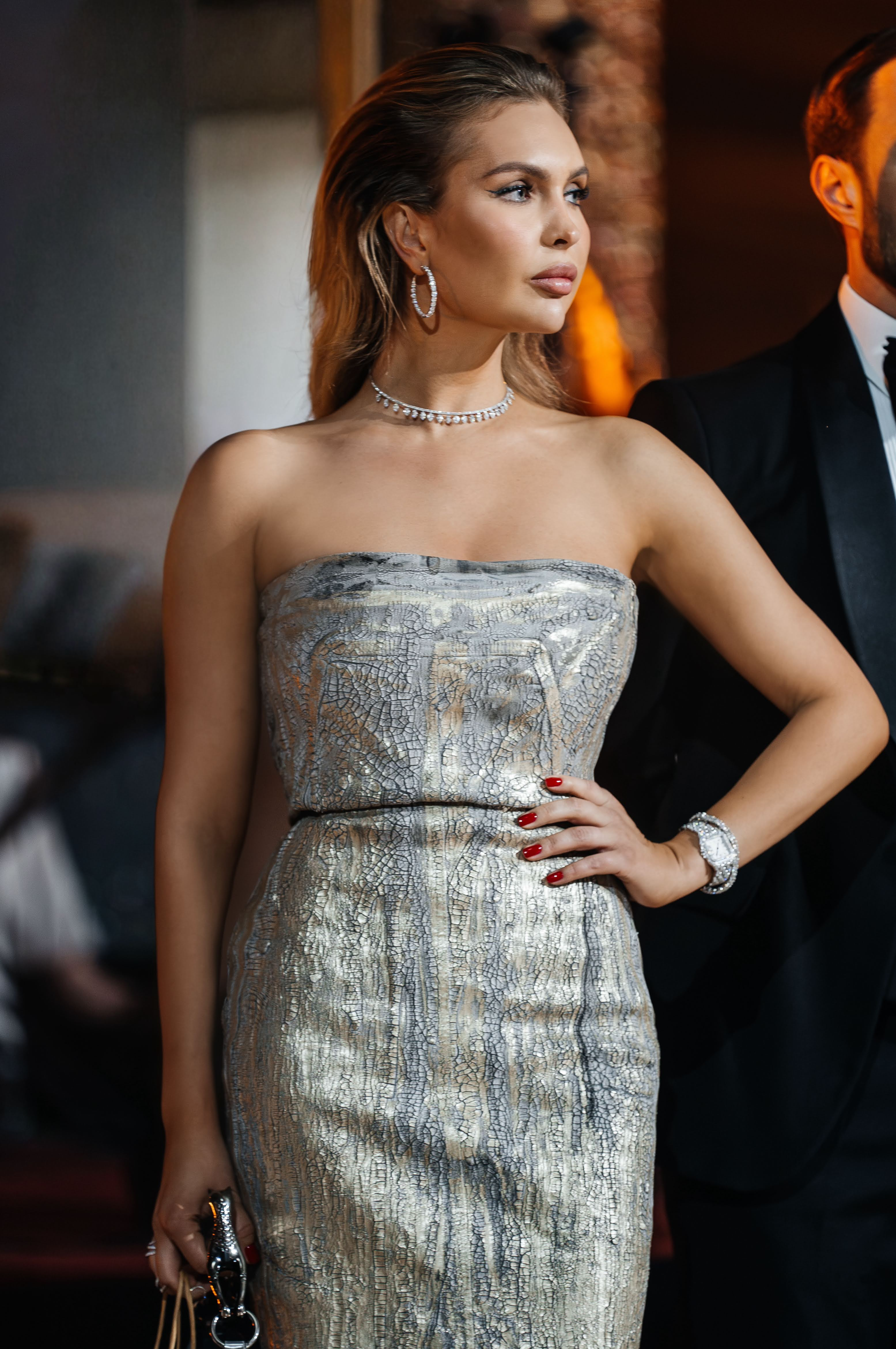
- Born: June 29, 1990 (age 36); Donetsk, Ukraine
- Education: National University of Physical Education and Sport of Ukraine, Kyiv National Economic University
- Occupations: Dancer; coach; judge
- Known for: Sports ballroom dancing
- Awards: Master of Sports of Ukraine International Class

Tetiana Omelchenko (Ukrainian: Тетяна Володимирівна Омельченко; born 29 June 1990) is a Ukrainian dancer, coach, and judge in sports ballroom dancing. She holds the title of Master of Sports of Ukraine International Class in sports ballroom dancing. Omelchenko has served as a judge at international tournaments, including the Monaco Pro-Am World Cup and the Barcelona Fabulous Cup.

== Early life and education ==
Omelchenko was born in Donetsk, Ukraine. She began training in dance at the age of six, graduated from Lyceum No. 12 in Donetsk and later attended the National University of Physical Education and Sport of Ukraine, studying on the coaching faculty in the department of professional and Olympic sports.

In 2025, she obtained a second higher education from the Kyiv National Economic University named after Vadym Hetman in international business management.

== Competitions career ==
Omelchenko competed in sports ballroom dancing from 2005 to 2009, primarily in the youth and under-21 categories for the European program and 10 dances. She was registered with the World DanceSport Federation (WDSF) as an adult competitor representing Ukraine from 2006 to 2008, partnering with Sergiy Gubar.

With Miheev, she placed 20th at the Open Kyiv Youth Standard in March 2005, 47th at the Open Izola Youth Latin in May 2005, and 26th at the Open Izola Youth Standard in May 2005. In adult competitions, they achieved 13th place at the Open Donetsk Adult Standard in February 2006 and 13th at the Open Kharkiv Adult Standard in March 2006.

With Gubar, notable results included 23rd at the Open Mikolajki Adult Standard in April 2007, 34th at the International Open Vienna Adult Standard in November 2007, 3rd at the Open Kyiv Adult Standard in February 2008, and 2nd at the Open Kharkiv Adult Standard in February 2008. In 2010, she was awarded the title of Master of Sports of Ukraine International Class.

In 2005, she placed third at the Ukrainian Championship in the youth 10 dances categories and was a finalist at the Slovenian Open in Izola.

In 2006, Tetiana earned third place at the Ukrainian Championship in the youth European program and third at the Tropicana Cup in Mikolajki, Poland in 10 dances.

During 2007, her results included sixth place at the Austrian Open in Vienna (European program), sixth at the IDSF International Open (European Championship), second at the Ukrainian Championship (adults, European program), and third at the Millennium Cup in Singapore (adults, European program).

In 2008, she won first place at the "Triumph of Dance" tournament and Stanislav Shklyar's Cup (both under-21, European program), and was a finalist at a tournament in Brno, Czech Republic (European program).

Her 2009 achievements comprised third place at the World Cup in Singapore (under-21, European program) and second at the Ukrainian Championship (European program).

In 2010, she was awarded the title of Master of Sports of Ukraine International Class.

== Coaching and judging career ==
Omelchenko transitioned to coaching and judging after her competitive career. In collaboration with lecturers from the National University of Physical Education and Sport of Ukraine, she developed an author's methodology for teaching the discipline "Sports Ballroom Dancing", aimed at acquiring practical and theoretical skills in teaching ballroom dances of varying complexity.

As a coach, her students have included winners of open international competitions and finalists at the Monaco World Cup and Ukrainian Championship. Athletes under her guidance have obtained sports ranks in the junior and youth categories.

She began judging as a category 1 judge for the All-Ukrainian Dance Sport Federation in 2011 and advanced to the highest international category with the International Dance Sport Association. Omelchenko has adjudicated at numerous national and international events, including all Ukrainian championships, Moscow Cup, Monaco Pro-Am World Cup, Barcelona Fabulous Cup, Austrian Open, Crown Cup Dubai, Budapest Ball, Paris Fabulous Cup, and served as a judge at the BIG Dance Pro-Am Party in 2017.

In 2011, she opened her own dance studio and became president of the "Salsa" dance club.

In 2014, she relocated to Kyiv, where she continued her coaching and judging activities.

== Other activities ==
Omelchenko has engaged in media and endorsement work. In February 2021, she became the face of the Anabel Arto lingerie brand's promotional campaign, appearing on posters and billboards in Kyiv. In April 2021, she prepared to serve as the Ukrainian ambassador for the Guess clothing brand. She has collaborated with the Ukrainian fashion brand FROLOV.

In 2024, she acted as an ambassador for the Forma beauty salon network, featured in a Vogue Ukraine article on summer beauty looks.

In 2011, she was nominated for the "Person of the Year" award in the "New Generation of the Year" category. In 2020, she was included in the Top-10 Most Influential Women in Dance Sports by the Ukrainian Networking Association. In December 2025, Tetiana became the main heroine of a music video by Max Barskih, written and composed by the artist and directed by Alan Badoev.

In 2026, she appeared for the second time in a music video by Max Barskih, for the song “Kolye.” The video was once again directed by Alan Badoev.
