= Vinyl 2 =

Vinyl #2

Studio album by Zivert
- Released: October 8, 2021
- Genre: pop
- Length: 40:07
- Languages: Russian, English
- Labels: Pervoye muzykalnoye izdatelstvo; Sem'ya

Zivert chronology
| Vinyl #1 (2019) | Vinyl #2 (2021) | V mire vesolykh (2023) |

Vinyl #2 is the second studio album by Russian singer Zivert, released on 8 October 2021 through the labels Pervoye muzykalnoye izdatelstvo and Sem'ya.

== Track listing ==
| No. | Title | Length |
|---|---|---|
| 1. | "Rokki" | 2:57 |
| 2. | "CRY" | 3:46 |
| 3. | "DEL MAR" | 3:40 |
| 4. | "Тебе" | 4:34 |
| 5. | "Три Дня Любви" | 3:11 |
| 6. | "Forever Young" (with LYRIQ) | 3:00 |
| 7. | "Не фарт" (with Бо) | 3:04 |
| 8. | "Турист" | 3:21 |
| 9. | "Два туриста" (with Wiwo) | 3:21 |
| 10. | "Тишина" | 4:03 |
| 11. | "Mnogotochiya" | 3:27 |
| 12. | "YATL" | 3:43 |
| Total length: | | 40:07 |

== Charts ==
Chart performance for Vinyl #2
| Chart (2021) | Peak position |
|---|---|
| Lithuanian Albums (AGATA) | 20 |
