= Max Barsky =

Max Barsky may refer to

- David Starr (wrestler) (born 1991), American wrestler
- Max Barskih (born 1990), Ukrainian singer
