= 1990 (disambiguation) =

1990 was a common year starting on Monday of the Gregorian calendar.

1990 may also refer to:

- 1990 (number), the natural number following 1989 and preceding 1991
- 1990 (TV series), a 1977–1978 BBC2 dystopian political thriller series
- 1990 (The Temptations album), 1973
- 1990 (Daniel Johnston album)
- 1990 (Max Barskih album), 2020
- "1990", a song by Jean Leloup
- MCMXC a.D., a 1990 album by Enigma
