= Credo (Zivert song) =

Single by Zivert

from the album Vinyl #1
- Language: Russian
- Released: September 20, 2019
- Genre: Pop
- Length: 3:04

Zivert singles chronology
"Beverly Hills" (2019)	"Credo" (2019)	"YATL" (2020)

"Credo" is a song by Russian pop singer Zivert, released on 20 September 2019 as the fourth single from her debut album Vinyl #1.

The site Сова noted that "the choreography deserves special attention".

== Achievements and reviews ==
Aleksei Mazhaev, a reviewer of the site InterMedia, stated that in the song, the performer uses simpler vocabulary and noticed that the song leaves an ambivalent impression.

== Charts ==
=== Weekly charts ===
2019 weekly chart performance for "Credo"
Chart (2019)	Peak position
CIS Airplay (TopHit)	1
Russia Airplay (TopHit)	1
Ukraine Airplay (TopHit)	15

2020 weekly chart performance for "Credo"
Chart (2020)	Peak position
CIS Airplay (TopHit)	1
Russia Airplay (TopHit)	1
Ukraine Airplay (FDR)	7
Ukraine Airplay (TopHit)	10
Ukraine Dance Airplay (FDR)	5

2021 weekly chart performance for "Credo"
Chart (2021)	Peak position
CIS Airplay (TopHit)	87
Russia Airplay (TopHit)	80

2023 weekly chart performance for "Credo"
Chart (2023)	Peak position
Kazakhstan Airplay (TopHit)	32
Moldova Airplay (TopHit)	60

=== Monthly charts ===
2019 monthly chart performance for "Credo"
Chart (2019)	Peak position
CIS Airplay (TopHit)	1
Russia Airplay (TopHit)	1
Ukraine Airplay (TopHit)	16

2020 monthly chart performance for "Credo"
Chart (2020)	Peak position
CIS Airplay (TopHit)	1
Latvia Airplay (LaIPA)	57
Russia Airplay (TopHit)	1
Ukraine Airplay (TopHit)	11

2021 monthly chart performance for "Credo"
Chart (2021)	Peak position
Russia Airplay (TopHit)	91

2023 monthly chart performance for "Credo"
Chart (2023)	Peak position
Kazakhstan Airplay (TopHit)	79
Moldova Airplay (TopHit)	73

=== Year-end charts ===
2019 year-end chart performance for "Credo"
Chart (2019)	Position
CIS Airplay (TopHit)	43
Russia Airplay (TopHit)	33

2020 year-end chart performance for "Credo"
Chart (2020)	Position
CIS Airplay (TopHit)	16
Russia Airplay (TopHit)	13
Ukraine Airplay (TopHit)	66

2021 year-end chart performance for "Credo"
Chart (2021)	Position
CIS Airplay (TopHit)	110
Russia Airplay (TopHit)	96

2022 year-end chart performance for "Credo"
Chart (2022)	Position
CIS Airplay (TopHit)	183
Russia Airplay (TopHit)	147

2023 year-end chart performance for "Credo"
Chart (2023)	Position
Kazakhstan Airplay (TopHit)	111
Moldova Airplay (TopHit)	166
Russia Airplay (TopHit)	186

=== Decade-end charts ===
20s Decade-end chart performance for "Credo"
Chart (2020–2025)	Position
CIS Airplay (TopHit)	49
Kazakhstan Airplay (TopHit)	18
Moldova Airplay (TopHit)	39
Russia Airplay (TopHit)	10
