= Mutki (song) =

Single by Zivert
- Language: Russian
- Released: July 19, 2024
- Genre: Pop
- Length: 2:48

Zivert singles chronology
"Beri i begi" (2023)	"Mutki" (2024)	"Yeda nevkusnaya" (2024)

Mutki (Russian: «Мутки») is a song by Russian singer Zivert, released as a single on 19 July 2024.

== Music video ==
In the black-and-white video, directed by Andrey Vekov, the singer appears as a sophisticated woman who unsuccessfully runs away from a faceless man, played by Matvey Lobov. The video was released on October 8, 2024.

Professional ratings
Review scores
Source	Rating
InterMedia	7/10

== Charts ==
=== Weekly charts ===
Weekly chart performance
Chart (2024)	Peak position
Belarus Airplay (TopHit)	59
CIS Airplay (TopHit)	20
Estonia Airplay (TopHit)	79
Kazakhstan Airplay (TopHit)	29
Latvia Airplay (TopHit)	19
Lithuania Airplay (TopHit)	49
Moldova Airplay (TopHit)	49
Russia Airplay (TopHit)	9

=== Monthly charts ===
2024 monthly chart performance
Chart (2024)	Peak position
Belarus Airplay (TopHit)	71
CIS Airplay (TopHit)	23
Kazakhstan Airplay (TopHit)	35
Latvia Airplay (TopHit)	35
Lithuania Airplay (TopHit)	91
Russia Airplay (TopHit)	13

2025 monthly chart performance
Chart (2025)	Peak position
Moldova Airplay (TopHit)	89

=== Year-end charts ===
2024 year-end chart performance
Chart (2024)	Position
CIS Airplay (TopHit)	119
Latvia Airplay (TopHit)	188
Russia Airplay (TopHit)	73
