= Wake Up! (Zivert song) =

Single by Zivert
- Language: Russian, English
- Released: July 1, 2022
- Genre: pop; funk; disco
- Length: 3:54

"Wake Up!" (Russian: "Проснись!") is a song by Russian singer Zivert, released on 1 July 2022 through the labels "Первое музыкальное издательство" & "Семья". The song entered the top five on the Russian radio chart.

== Music video ==
The music video for the song was released on 11 August 2022. Its director and cameraman was Aleksei Kupriyanov. Filming for the music video took place in Moscow. The video includes not only Zivert, but other stars such as Basta, Mot, Niletto, HammAli & Navai, Dima Bilan, Lyriq, Andro & Elena Letuchaya.

== Charts ==
=== Weekly charts ===
2022 weekly chart performance
Chart (2022)	Peak position
CIS Airplay (TopHit)	12
Russia Airplay (TopHit)	5

2023 weekly chart performance
Chart (2023)	Peak position
Belarus Airplay (TopHit)	47
CIS Airplay (TopHit)	43
Kazakhstan Airplay (TopHit)	26
Russia Airplay (TopHit)	32

=== Monthly charts ===
2022 monthly chart performance for "Wake Up!"
Chart (2022)	Peak position
CIS Airplay (TopHit)	13
Russia Airplay (TopHit)	6

2023 monthly chart performance for "Wake Up!"
Chart (2023)	Peak position
Belarus Airplay (TopHit)	54
CIS Airplay (TopHit)	60
Kazakhstan Airplay (TopHit)	37
Russia Airplay (TopHit)	39

2024 monthly chart performance for "Wake Up!"
Chart (2024)	Peak position
Kazakhstan Airplay (TopHit)	64

=== Year-end charts ===
2022 year-end chart performance for "Wake Up!"
Chart (2022)	Position
CIS Airplay (TopHit)	86
Russia Airplay (TopHit)	60

2023 year-end chart performance for "Wake Up!"
Chart (2023)	Position
Belarus Airplay (TopHit)	80
CIS Airplay (TopHit)	102
Kazakhstan Airplay (TopHit)	49
Russia Airplay (TopHit)	70

2024 year-end chart performance for "Wake Up!"
Chart (2024)	Position
Belarus Airplay (TopHit)	194
Kazakhstan Airplay (TopHit)	184
Russia Airplay (TopHit)	172

=== Decade-end charts ===
20s Decade-end chart performance for "Wake Up!"
Chart (2020–2025)	Position
Kazakhstan Airplay (TopHit)	189
Latvia Airplay (TopHit)	46
Russia Airplay (TopHit)	120
