= Beverly Hills (Zivert song) =

Single by Zivert
- Language: Russian, English
- Released: September 6, 2019
- Genre: Electropop; Dance-pop
- Length: 3:40
- Label: Pervoye muzykalnoye izdatelstvo

Zivert singles chronology
"Parusa" (2019)	"Beverly Hills" (2019)	"Credo" (2019)

"Beverly Hills" (Russian: "Беверли-Хиллз") is a song by Russian pop singer Zivert, released on 6 September 2019 as the third and final single from the debut studio album Vinyl #1.

== History ==
On 19 September 2019, Zivert sang the single at the music festival "Белые ночи" in Saint Petersburg, dedicated to the 25th anniversary of "Russian Radio".

On 28 November 2020, Zivert sang the song at the concert "Life is fun". In the same year, "Beverly Hills" was one of the Top-100 Russian songs of 2020 on Apple Music.

== Music video ==
At the beginning of 2020, TNT Music music editors formed a list of the best videos of 2019, in which "Beverly Hills" took 79th place.

== Charts ==
=== Weekly charts ===
2019 weekly chart performance for "Beverly Hills"
Chart (2019)	Peak position
CIS Airplay (TopHit)	110
Russia Airplay (TopHit)	132
Ukraine Airplay (TopHit)	30

2020 weekly chart performance for "Beverly Hills"
Chart (2020)	Peak position
Bulgaria Airplay (PROPHON)	2
CIS Airplay (TopHit)	27
Latvia Streaming (LaIPA)	89
Russia Airplay (TopHit)	25
Ukraine Airplay (TopHit)	19

2021 weekly chart performance for "Beverly Hills"
Chart (2021)	Peak position
CIS Airplay (TopHit)	184
Russia Airplay (TopHit)	168

2022 weekly chart performance for "Beverly Hills"
Chart (2022)	Peak position
CIS Airplay (TopHit)	182
Russia Airplay (TopHit)	156

2023 weekly chart performance for "Beverly Hills"
Chart (2023)	Peak position
Kazakhstan Airplay (TopHit)	40
Latvia Airplay (TopHit)	180
Lithuania Airplay (TopHit)	170
Moldova Airplay (TopHit)	57
Russia Airplay (TopHit)	164

2024 weekly chart performance for "Beverly Hills"
Chart (2024)	Peak position
Kazakhstan Airplay (TopHit)	36
Moldova Airplay (TopHit)	104
Russia Airplay (TopHit)	172

2025 weekly chart performance for "Beverly Hills"
Chart (2025)	Peak position
Kazakhstan Airplay (TopHit)	62
Moldova Airplay (TopHit)	94
Russia Airplay (TopHit)	159

2026 weekly chart performance for "Beverly Hills"
Chart (2026)	Peak position
Kazakhstan Airplay (TopHit)	11

=== Monthly charts ===
2019 monthly chart performance for "Beverly Hills"
Chart (2019)	Peak position
Ukraine Airplay (TopHit)	69

2020 monthly chart performance for "Beverly Hills"
Chart (2020)	Peak position
CIS Airplay (TopHit)	28
Russia Airplay (TopHit)	30
Ukraine Airplay (TopHit)	30

2023 monthly chart performance for "Beverly Hills"
Chart (2023)	Peak position
Kazakhstan Airplay (TopHit)	53
Moldova Airplay (TopHit)	77

2024 monthly chart performance for "Beverly Hills"
Chart (2024)	Peak position
Kazakhstan Airplay (TopHit)	45

2026 monthly chart performance for "Beverly Hills"
Chart (2026)	Peak position
Kazakhstan Airplay (TopHit)	37

=== Year-end charts ===
2020 year-end chart performance for "Beverly Hills"
Chart (2020)	Position
Bulgaria Airplay (PROPHON)	6
CIS Airplay (TopHit)	80
Russia Airplay (TopHit)	91
Ukraine Airplay (TopHit)	161

2023 year-end chart performance for "Beverly Hills"
Chart (2023)	Position
Kazakhstan Airplay (TopHit)	77

2024 year-end chart performance for "Beverly Hills"
Chart (2024)	Position
Kazakhstan Airplay (TopHit)	74
Moldova Airplay (TopHit)	176

2025 year-end chart performance for "Beverly Hills"
Chart (2025)	Position
Kazakhstan Airplay (TopHit)	132

=== Decade-end charts ===
20s Decade-end chart performance for "Beverly Hills"
Chart (2020–2025)	Position
CIS Airplay (TopHit)	149
Kazakhstan Airplay (TopHit)	2
Moldova Airplay (TopHit)	67
Russia Airplay (TopHit)	126

== Nominations ==
Award	Year	Category	Result	Ref.
Russian National Music Award "Victoria"	2019	Dance hit of the year	Nominated	
Muz-TV Awards	2021	Best Music Video	Nominated	
