= 1990 (Max Barskih album) =

2020 album by Max Barskih

Studio album by Max Barskih
- Released: October 9, 2020
- Genre: Pop
- Length: 41:57
- Language: Russian
- Label: Sony Music Entertainment

1990 is the fifth studio album by Ukrainian singer Max Barskih, released on 9 October 2020 under Russian label Sony Music Entertainment. This album completes the trilogy which includes the albums Туманы & 7. According to Max, the title was inspired by his birth year, and the songs are done in the style of the 80s & 90s.

== History ==
The concert for the album's release was scheduled for 12 December 2020. The venue was the bar Memo Dine & Bar, however, after Max's performance, the concert hall was closed over COVID-19 prevention violations and work at night.

Prior to the album's release, Barskih posted on his Instagram several snippets of songs.

=== Singles ===
On 22 November 2019, the song «Лей, не жалей» was released, which became the lead single from the album. A mood video for the song was released the same day, and the official music video was released on 7 February 2020. The director of the music video was Alan Badoev.

On 28 February 2020, the first promo single of the album, «Небо льёт дождём», was released. Along with the song, a mood video was released. Its director was Alan Badoev.

On 15 May 2020, Barskih released the song «По секрету», which was the next and last single before the album's releаse. A video was released the same day as the track. Its director was Alan Badoev.

== Track listing ==
| No. | Title | Length |
|---|---|---|
| 1. | "Армаггедон" | 3:37 |
| 2. | "Самолёт" | 3:33 |
| 3. | "По местам" | 3:32 |
| 4. | "Океаны" | 3:46 |
| 5. | "Лей, не жалей" | 3:30 |
| 6. | "Небо льёт дождём" | 3:31 |
| 7. | "Наивна" | 3:27 |
| 8. | "Пустые глаза" | 2:57 |
| 9. | "По секрету" | 3:21 |
| 10. | "Всё проходит" | 3:13 |
| 11. | "Двоє" | 3:41 |
| 12. | "Любовь, не умирай" (featuring Misha Romanova) | 3:49 |
| Total length: | | 41:57 |
