= Rokki =

Single by Zivert

from the album Vinyl 2
- Language: Russian
- Released: June 11, 2021
- Genre: Synthwave
- Length: 2:57

"Rokki" (Russian: Рокки) is a single by Russian singer Zivert, released on 11 June 2021 as the third single from her second studio album Vinyl #2.

It was recognized as the dance hit of the year at the Russian National Music Awards.

== Promotion ==
The artist performed the song for the first time in a concert in Kostroma, Russia, on June 16, 2021.
