= Parusa =

Single by Mot and Zivert
- Language: Russian
- English title: Sails
- Released: June 6, 2019
- Genre: Pop
- Length: 3:30
- Label: Black Star Inc.

Mot and Zivert singles chronology
"Sharik" (2019)	"Parusa" (2019)	"Beverly Hills" (2019)

"Parusa" (Russian: Паруса) is a song by Russian rapper Mot and Russian singer Zivert, released on June 6, 2019 as a single.

== History ==
According to the singers, the main sources for the song's inspiration were from touring and music from the 80s and 90s.

On 18 July 2019, a remix of the song was released titled "Parusa (Alex Shik & Slabing Radio Edit)".

== Music video ==
The official music video for the song was released on July 25, 2019 on Mot's YouTube channel. In it, both performers relax on a yacht, dance on the pier and sunbathe. Farit Amirov from the internet platform Sova called the clip "a truly summer video that matches the song."

== Charts ==
=== Weekly charts ===
2019 weekly chart performance for "Parusa"
Chart (2019)	Peak position
CIS Airplay (TopHit)	47
Russia Airplay (TopHit)	45

2025 weekly chart performance for "Parusa"
Chart (2025)	Peak position
Kazakhstan Airplay (TopHit)	54

=== Monthly charts ===
Monthly chart performance for "Parusa"
Chart (2019)	Peak position
CIS Airplay (TopHit)	49
Russia Airplay (TopHit)	49
