= Life (Zivert song) =

Song by Zivert

from the album Vinyl #1
- Language: Russian, English
- Released: November 30, 2018
- Genre: Pop
- Length: 3:08
- Label: Pervoye muzykalnoye izdatelstvo

Zivert singles chronology
| "Zelyonye Volny" (2018) | "Life" (2018) | "Mozhno vso" (2018) |

"Life" is a song by Russian pop singer Zivert, released on 30 November 2018 as a single for her album Vinyl #1. It was released through the label Pervoye muzykalnoye.

== History ==
On March 17, 2019, an English version of the song was released.

== Music video ==
The video was filmed in Hong Kong. On 4 October 2021 the music video gained over 100,000,000 views.

== Charts ==
=== Weekly charts ===
2019 weekly chart performance for "Life"
| Chart (2019) | Peak position |
|---|---|
| Bulgaria Airplay (PROPHON) | 2 |
| CIS Airplay (TopHit) | 19 |
| Greece International Airplay (IFPI) | 15 |
| Latvia Airplay (Radiomonitor) | 20 |
| Latvia Streaming (LaIPA) | 45 |
| Russia Airplay (TopHit) | 17 |
| Ukraine Airplay (TopHit) | 23 |

2020 weekly chart performance for "Life"
| Chart (2020) | Peak position |
|---|---|
| CIS Airplay (TopHit) | 117 |
| Russia Airplay (TopHit) | 122 |
| Ukraine Airplay (TopHit) | 193 |

2021 weekly chart performance for "Life"
| Chart (2021) | Peak position |
|---|---|
| CIS Airplay (TopHit) | 185 |
| Russia Airplay (TopHit) | 188 |

2023 weekly chart performance for "Life"
| Chart (2023) | Peak position |
|---|---|
| Kazakhstan Airplay (TopHit) | 53 |
| Moldova Airplay (TopHit) | 126 |

2024 weekly chart performance for "Life"
| Chart (2024) | Peak position |
|---|---|
| Belarus Airplay (TopHit) | 101 |
| Kazakhstan Airplay (TopHit) | 54 |
| Russia Airplay (TopHit) | 196 |

2025 weekly chart performance for "Life"
| Chart (2025) | Peak position |
|---|---|
| Lithuania Airplay (TopHit) | 7 |

=== Weekly charts (Remix) ===
Weekly chart performance for "Life (Lavrushkin & Mephisto Rmx)"
| Chart (2019) | Peak position |
|---|---|
| CIS Airplay (TopHit) | 34 |
| Russia Airplay (TopHit) | 35 |
| Ukraine Airplay (TopHit) | 31 |

=== Monthly charts ===
2019 monthly chart performance for "Life"
| Chart (2019) | Peak position |
|---|---|
| CIS Airplay (TopHit) | 23 |
| Russia Airplay (TopHit) | 22 |
| Ukraine Airplay (TopHit) | 31 |

2024 monthly chart performance for "Life"
| Chart (2024) | Peak position |
|---|---|
| Kazakhstan Airplay (TopHit) | 88 |

2025 monthly chart performance for "Life"
| Chart (2025) | Peak position |
|---|---|
| Lithuania Airplay (TopHit) | 11 |

2026 monthly chart performance for "Life"
| Chart (2026) | Peak position |
|---|---|
| Kazakhstan Airplay (TopHit) | 76 |

=== Monthly charts (Remix) ===
Monthly chart performance for "Life (Lavrushkin & Mephisto Rmx)"
| Chart (2019) | Peak position |
|---|---|
| CIS Airplay (TopHit) | 35 |
| Russia Airplay (TopHit) | 35 |
| Ukraine Airplay (TopHit) | 54 |

=== Year-end charts ===
2019 year-end chart performance for "Life"
| Chart (2019) | Position |
|---|---|
| Bulgaria Airplay (PROPHON) | 10 |
| CIS Airplay (TopHit) | 53 |
| Latvia Streaming (LaIPA) | 45 |
| Russia Airplay (TopHit) | 59 |
| Ukraine Airplay (TopHit) | 139 |

2020 year-end chart performance for "Life"
| Chart (2020) | Position |
|---|---|
| CIS Airplay (TopHit) | 189 |
| Russia Airplay (TopHit) | 198 |

2023 year-end chart performance for "Life"
| Chart (2023) | Position |
|---|---|
| Kazakhstan Airplay (TopHit) | 123 |

2024 year-end chart performance for "Life"
| Chart (2024) | Position |
|---|---|
| Kazakhstan Airplay (TopHit) | 136 |

2025 year-end chart performance for "Life"
| Chart (2025) | Position |
|---|---|
| Lithuania Airplay (TopHit) | 182 |

=== Decade-end charts ===
20s Decade-end chart performance for "Life"
| Chart (2020–2025) | Position |
|---|---|
| Kazakhstan Airplay (TopHit) | 68 |
| Lithuania Airplay (TopHit) | 12 |
