= Vinyl 1 =

Vinyl #1

Studio album by Zivert
- Released: 27 September 2019
- Genre: Pop
- Length: 30:11
- Label: Pervoye muzykalnoye izdatelstvo

Zivert chronology
Vinyl #1 (2019)	Vinyl #2 (2021)

Singles from Vinyl 1
- 1. "Life" Released: 30 November 2018; 2. "Sharik" Released: 26 April 2019; 3. "Beverly Hills" Released: 25 September 2019

Vinyl #1 is the first studio album by Russian singer Zivert, released on September 27, 2019 by Pervoye muzykalnoye.

== Promotion ==
The project was anticipated by the release of three individual extracts. The first, "Life", released on November 30, 2018, and accompanied by a music video shot in Hong Kong, entered the rankings of four markets the following year, including Bulgaria and Latvia, resulting one of the most successful songs throughout 2019 on the main Russian streaming platforms, i.e. Yandex Music and VK Music.

On April 26, 2019 "Šarik" was presented, the second extract from the album. "Beverly Hills", which achieved a fair amount of popularity in the Bulgarian and Russian radio charts, was released through a remix EP on 25 September 2019, while the related music video was released on 21 November 2019.

Although it was not extracted as a single, the track "Credo" managed to place itself at the top of the Russian radio charts of Tophit, becoming the first number one in the charts.

== Charts ==
=== Weekly charts ===
Weekly chart performance for Vinyl #1
Chart (2019–2020)	Peak position
Estonian Albums (Eesti Tipp-40)	30
Latvian Albums (LaIPA)	9
Lithuanian Albums (AGATA)	12

=== Year-end charts ===
2019 year-end chart performance for Vinyl #1
Chart (2019)	Position
Latvian Albums (LaIPA)	99

Professional ratings
Review scores
Source	Rating
InterMedia	7.5/10
