= Neboley =

Single by Zivert, Basta
- Language: Russian
- Released: August 7, 2020
- Genre: Pop
- Length: 5:34
- Label: Gazgolder

Zivert, Basta singles chronology
| "Fly 2" (2020) | "Neboley" (2020) | "Mnogotochiya" (2020) |

Neboley (Russian: Неболей) is a single by Russian pop singer Zivert and Russian musician Basta, released on 7 August 2020 through the labels Gazgolder & "Первое музыкальное Издательство". The composition is dedicated to the couple's relationship.

== History ==
On 4 September 2020, Zivert & Basta sang the song on the evening show "Evening Urgant".

== Music video ==
The music video for the track was released on 7 August 2020, the same day the track was released, through the official YouTube-channel for Gazgolder.

On 14 September 2020 there was a live version of the song on YouTube.

== Charts ==
=== Weekly charts ===
2020 weekly chart performance for "Neboley"
| Chart (2020) | Peak position |
|---|---|
| CIS Airplay (TopHit) | 75 |
| Latvia Airplay (Radiomonitor) | 20 |
| Russia Airplay (TopHit) | 84 |
| Ukraine Airplay (TopHit) | 51 |

2021 weekly chart performance for "Neboley"
| Chart (2021) | Peak position |
|---|---|
| CIS Airplay (TopHit) | 74 |
| Ukraine Airplay (TopHit) | 10 |

2023 weekly chart performance for "Neboley"
| Chart (2023) | Peak position |
|---|---|
| Moldova Airplay (TopHit) | 60 |

=== Monthly charts ===
2020 monthly chart performance for "Neboley"
| Chart (2020) | Peak position |
|---|---|
| CIS Airplay (TopHit) | 90 |
| Russia Airplay (TopHit) | 97 |
| Ukraine Airplay (TopHit) | 75 |

2021 monthly chart performance for "Neboley"
| Chart (2021) | Peak position |
|---|---|
| CIS Airplay (TopHit) | 91 |
| Ukraine Airplay (TopHit) | 12 |

2023 monthly chart performance for "Neboley"
| Chart (2023) | Peak position |
|---|---|
| Moldova Airplay (TopHit) | 94 |

=== Year-end charts ===
2021 year-end chart performance for "Neboley"
| Chart (2021) | Position |
|---|---|
| Ukraine Airplay (TopHit) | 50 |

2023 year-end chart performance for "Neboley"
| Chart (2023) | Position |
|---|---|
| Moldova Airplay (TopHit) | 180 |

=== Decade-end charts ===
20s Decade-end chart performance for "Neboley"
| Chart (2020–2025) | Position |
|---|---|
| Moldova Airplay (TopHit) | 76 |
