= Alan Badoev =

Ukrainian movie director (born 1981)

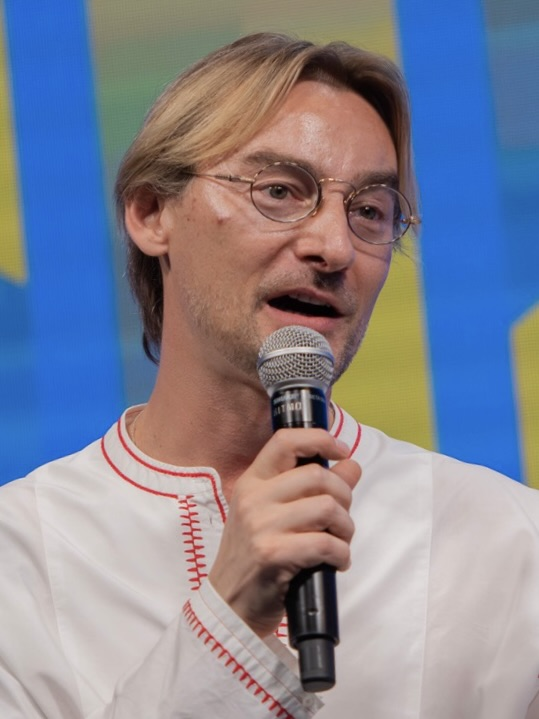
- Born: Alan Kazbekovich Badoev; January 10, 1981 (age 45); Beslan, North Ossetian Autonomous Soviet Socialist Republic
- Other name: Alan Badoev (Алан Бадоєв)
- Citizenship: U.S.S.R. (until 1992) Ukrainian
- Education: Kyiv National Karpenko-Kary Theatre, Cinema and Television University
- Occupations: Movie director; Music video director; Screenwriter; TV producer; TV presenter; Music producer
- Years active: 2000–present
- Spouse: Zhanna Badoeva (m. 2003; div. 2012)
- Children: daughter Lolita and son Boris
- Website: badoev.com

Alan Kazbekovich Badoev (Ukrainian: Алан Казбекович Бадоєв; born January 1981) is a Ukrainian movie director, music video director, screenwriter, TV producer, TV presenter, and music producer of Ossetian origin. He first gained international recognition in 2006 with his awarded full-length movie debut "OrAngeLove" (Russian: Оранжевая любовь). Today, Badoev is most notable for his prize-winning work as music video director. He has directed more than 500 music videos.

== Early life ==
Alan Kazbekovich Badoev was born on January 10, 1981, in Beslan, North Ossetian Autonomous Soviet Socialist Republic. He grew up in the city of Horlivka, Ukraine.

In 1998, he began his studies at the Kyiv National Karpenko-Kary University and graduated in 2003. During his studies, he began to make documentaries, short films, and music videos (e.g. for Iryna Bilyk and Dmitri Klimashenko).

== Personal life ==
From 2003 to 2012, Badoev was married to Ukrainian TV presenter, actress, producer, and designer Zhanna Badoeva. They have a daughter, Lolita, and he adopted Zhanna's son from her first marriage, Boris. In 2011 and 2017, Badoev and Zhanna Badoeva starred together as TV presenters in two seasons of the Ukrainian travel TV show Heads and Tails.

In 2004, Badoev's father was taken hostage by a Chechen group in Beslan. According to Badoev, he sold most of his belongings to pay the ransom for his father's release.

After February 24, 2022, the celebrity participated in the GIDNA project from Future for Ukraine Charity Foundation.

== Filmography ==
Movies by Badoev
Year	English Title	Original title	Movie type	Director	Screenwriter	Remark
1999	Life Take Two	Russian: «Жизнь дубль два»/«Zhizn' dubl' dva»	Documentary cycle	Yes	Yes	Collection of documentaries by Badoev; Won "Best Documentary" award at the Golden Knight Malta International Short Film Festival
2000	Trace 2000	Russian: «След 2000»/«Sled 2000»	Short film	Yes	Yes	
2000	Ear and Stubble	Russian: «Колос и стерня»/«Kolos i sternya»	Short film	Yes	Yes	
2000	Five Minutes or Legends of the Killed Time	Russian: «Пять минут или Легенды убитого времени»/«Pyat' minut ili Legendy ubitogo vremeni»	Short film	Yes	Yes	Won "Best Director" and "Best Cinematography" awards at the International Student Festival of Audiovisual Arts "Fast-Fest Weekend"
2002	Angels live opposite	Russian: «Ангелы живут напротив»/«Angely zhivut naprotiv»	Full-length cinema movie	No	Yes	Badoev awarded "Order of the Protection of the Blessed Virgin Mary"
2006	OrAngeLove	Russian: «Оранжевая любовь» /«Oranzhevaya lyubov'»	Full-length cinema movie	Yes	Yes	Won several awards including "Best director" for Badoev at the Kinoshock International Film Festival
2012	Moms	Russian: «Мамы» /«Mamy»	Full-length cinema movie	Yes	No	Dedicated to International Women's Day
2012	Jealousy	Russian: «Ревность» / «Revnost'»	Short film	Yes	Yes	Nominated for "Best Short Film" at the Odesa International Film Festival and the Moscow International Film Festival
2012	Z.Dance	«Z.Dance»	Musical feature film	Yes	Yes	Musical movie for and with Max Barskih
2013	Mademoiselle Zhivago	«Mademoiselle Zhivago»	Musical feature film	Yes	Yes	Musical movie starring Lara Fabian in the main role, featuring all songs of Fabian's Mademoiselle Zhivago album composed by Igor Krutoy

== Television shows ==
Year	English Title	Original Title	TV Channel	Director	Producer	Screenwriter	TV presenter	Remarks
2008	Star Factory (Season 2)	"Fabrika Zirok" (Ukrainian: "Фабрика зірок")	New Channel	Yes	No	No	No	Talent show; Ukrainian version of Star Academy
2010	Made in Ukraine (Seasons 1 and 2)	"Porobleno v Ukrayini" (Ukrainian: Пороблено в Україні)	Inter (Ukraine), Zoom (Ukraine)	Yes	Yes	Yes	No	Musical parody show
2011	Heads and Tails (Season 1)	"Orel i Reshka" (Russian: Орел и Решка)	Inter (Ukraine), Friday! (Russia), Seventh (Kazakhstan)(ru), Israel Plus (Israel)	No	No	Yes	Yes	Travel show
2012	Red or Black?	"Krasnoye or Chernoye?" (Russian: Красное или Черное?)	Inter (Ukraine)	Yes	No	No	No	Game show; Ukrainian version of Simon Cowell's show Red or Black?
2013	I Want to VIA Gra	"Khochu v VYA Hru" (Russian: Хочу в "ВИА Гру)	NTV (Russia), ONT (Belarus), HTK (Kazakhstan)(ru), 1+1 (Ukraine)	Yes	Yes	Yes	No	International casting show for band VIA Gra
2014	I Want to Meladze	"Khochu k Meladze" (Russian: Хочу к Меладзе)	NTV (Russia), ONT (Belarus), Seventh (Kazakhstan)(ru), Ukraine TV (Ukraine)	Yes	Yes	Yes	No	International casting show for MBAND and a collaboration with Konstantin Meladze
2017	Heads and Tails (Seasons 10 and 11)	"Orel i Reshka" (Russian: Орел и Решка)	Inter (Ukraine), Friday! (Russia), Seventh (Kazakhstan)(ru), Israel Plus (Israel)	No	No	No	Yes	Travel show

== Selected videography ==
Badoev has directed more than 500 music videos for Ukrainian, Russian, and other international artists, including:

- Alekseev — «Drunken Sun» (2015), «Снов осколки» (2016), «Океанами стали» (2016), «Чувствую душой» (2017), «Forever » (2018), «Целуй» (2019), «Камень и вода» (2019)
- Alla Pugacheva — «Приглашение на закат» (2007)
- Ani Lorak — «A Little Shot of Love» (2004), «С первого взгляда» (2007), «Удержи моё сердце» (2016), «Уходи по-английски» (2016), «Разве ты любил» (2016), «Ты ещё любишь» (2017), «Новый бывший» (2017), «Мы нарушаем» (2019), «Я бы летала» (2020)
- Arash (singer) feat. Helena — «Dooset Daram» (2018)
- Dan Balan — «Люби» (2012), «Lendo Calendo» (2013), «Funny Love» (2015), «Плачь» (2015), «Holdon Love» (2017)
- Dimash Kudaibergen — «Love of Tired Swans» (2019), «Know» (2019)
- Dmitri Hvorostovsky and Igor Krutoy — «Toi et Moi» (2009)
- ETOLUBOV -- «Ты такой» (2021)
- Iryna Bilyk — «А мені б туди» (2001), «Снег" (2003)
- Jamala — «History Repeating» (2009)
- Kazaky — «Dance and Change» (2012), «Push» (2019)
- Kazka — «ПАЛАЛА/NIRVANA» " (2020)
- Lara Fabian — «Mademoiselle Zhivago» (2013)
- Mariya Yaremchuk — «Ти в мені є»(2017)
- Max Barskih — «Агония» (2009), «Пусто» (2009), «DVD» (2009), «Сердце бьётся» (2010), «Студент» (2010), «Белый ворон» (2011), «Глаза-убийцы» (2011), «Теряю тебя» (2011), «Z.Dance» (2012), «По Фрейду» (2013), «Какой была твоя любовь» (2013), «Hero_In» (2013), «Небо» (2013), «Всё серьёзно» (2014), «Отпусти» (2014), «Хочу танцевать» (2015), «Подруга-ночь» (2015), «Займёмся любовью» (2016), «Последний летний день» (2016), «Туманы/Неверная» (2016), «Моя любовь» (2017), «Февраль» (2017), «Сделай громче» (2018), «Полураздета (2018), «Берега (2018), «Лей, не жалей» (2020), «По секрету» (2020), «Silence» (2020)
- NK (Ukrainian singer) — «#Этомояночь» (2017)
- Philipp Kirkorov — «Мы так нелепо разошлись» (2010), «Снег»,(2011) «Мне не жаль тебя» (2011)
- Polina Gagarina — «Нет» (2012), «Навек» (2013), «Immortal Feelings » (2014), «Выше головы» (2018)
- Sofia Rotaru — «Вишнёвый сад (Зимняя вишня)» (2005)
- Svetlana Loboda/LOBODA — «Чёрно-белая зима» (2004), «Я забуду тебя» (2005), «Ты не забудешь» (2005), «Постой, муЩина!» (2006), «Мишка, гадкий мальчишка» (2007), «За что» (2008), «Не ма4о!» (2008; video footage also used for Be My Valentine! (Anti-Crisis Girl) music video (2009)), «By Your Side» (2009), «Жить легко» (2010), «Сердце бьётся» (2010), «Революция» (2010), «На свете» (2011), «New Rome» (2020)
- Sergey Lazarev — «Сдавайся » (2018)
- Tayanna — «9 жизней» (2016), «Осень» (2016), «Люблю» (2016), «Не люби» (2017), «Грешу» (2017), «Шкода» (2017), «Кричу» (2018), «Леля» (2018)
- Tina Karol — «Ноченька" (2006), «Люблю его» (2007) «Ніжно» (2012)
- Valery Meladze — «Небеса» (2010), «Не теряй меня» (2010)
- Vera Brezhneva — «Я не играю» (2008), «Нирвана» (2008), «Любовь спасёт мир» (2010), «Реальная жизнь» (2011), «Бессонница» (2012), «Девочка моя» (2014), «Близкие люди» (2017), «Любите Друг Друга» (2019)
- VIA Gra — «ЛМЛ» (2006), «Цветок и нож» (2007), «Поцелуи» (2008), « Алло, мам» (2012), «Перемирие» (2013)
- Zivert — «Beverly Hills" (2019), «Credo» (2020), «ЯТЛ» (2020)

== Music production ==
Badoev is the music producer of several Ukrainian artists, most notably of the prize-winning singers Max Barskih and Tayanna.

== Awards and nominations ==
Year	Award	Country	Category	Work	Result
2000	International Student Festival of Audiovisual Arts Fast-Fest Weekend	Ukraine (international award)	Best Director	Short movie Five Minutes or Legends of the Killed Time («Пять минут или Легенды убитого времени»/«Pyat' minut ili Legendy ubitogo vremeni»)	Won
2000	International Student Festival of Audiovisual Arts Fast-Fest Weekend	Ukraine (international award)	Best Cinematography	Short movie Five Minutes or Legends of the Killed Time («Пять минут или Легенды убитого времени»/«Pyat' minut ili Legendy ubitogo vremeni»)	Won
2000	Golden Knight Malta International Short Film Festival	Malta (international award)	Best Documentary	Documentary collection "Double Life Two" («Жизнь дубль два»/«Zhizn' dubl' dva»)	Won
2000	Enlightenment Film Festival	Ukraine (national award)	Best Documentary	Documentary collection "Double Life Two" («Жизнь дубль два»/«Zhizn' dubl' dva»)	Won
2002	Order of the Protection of the Blessed Virgin; Mary for contribution to the development of art in Ukraine and the reflection of acute social problems in a highly artistic language	Ukraine (national award)	awarded for his screenwriting	Full-length cinema movie Angels live conversely	Won
2005	OGAE Eurovision Video Contest	Portugal (international award)	Best Music Video of the Year	«Я забуду тебя» («Ya zabudu tebya»/«I Will Forget You») by Svetlana Loboda, directed by Badoev	Won
2006	ZD Awards	Russia (national award)	Best Music Video of the Year	«ЛМЛ» («LML») by VIA Gra, directed by Badoev	Nominated
2006	International Kinoshock Film Festival	Russia (international award)	Best Director	Full-length cinema movie "OrAngeLove" «Оранжевая любовь» /«Oranzhevaya lyubov'»)	Won
2006	2006 Cannes Film Festival	France (international film festival)	special honor for being the first Ukrainian movie to be presented at the festival	Full-length cinema movie "OrAngeLove" «Оранжевая любовь» /«Oranzhevaya lyubov'»)	Won
2007	Tallinn Black Nights Film Festival	Estonia (international award)	Grand Prix	Full-length cinema movie "OrAngeLove" «Оранжевая любовь» /«Oranzhevaya lyubov'»)	Nominated
2007	EGO People of the Year Awards 2007	Ukraine (national award)	Best Director	Full-length cinema movie "OrAngeLove" «Оранжевая любовь» /«Oranzhevaya lyubov'»)	Won
2007	OGAE Eurovision Video Contest	Italy (international award)	Best Music Video of the Year	«ЛМЛ» («LML») by VIA Gra, directed by Badoev	Won
2007	MTV Russia Music Awards	Russia (international award)	Best Music Video of the Year	«Цветок и нож» («Tsvetok i nozh»/«Flower and Knife») by VIA Gra, directed by Badoev	Nominated
2007	Muz-TV Awards	Russia (national award)	Best Music Video of the Year	«Цветок и нож» («Tsvetok i nozh»/«Flower and Knife») by VIA Gra, directed by Badoev	Won
2007	ZD Awards	Russia (national award)	Best Music Video of the Year	«Приглашение на закат» («Priglasheniye na zakat»/Invitation to Sunset») by Alla Pugacheva, directed by Badoev	Won
2007	ZD Awards	Russia (national award)	Best Music Video of the Year	«Поцелуи» («Potselui»/«Kisses») by VIA Gra, directed by Badoev	Nominated
2008	OGAE Eurovision Video Contest	Russia (international award)	Best Music Video of the Year	«Поцелуи» («Potselui»/«Kisses») by VIA Gra, directed by Badoev	Won
2008	MTV Russia Music Awards	Russia (international award)	Sexiest Music Video of the Year	«Поцелуи» («Potselui»/«Kisses») by VIA Gra, directed by Badoev	Nominated
2008	Muz-TV Awards	Russia (national award)	Best Music Video of the Year	«Поцелуи» («Potselui»/«Kisses») by VIA Gra, directed by Badoev	Won
2009	OGAE Eurovision Video Contest	Russia (international award)	Best Music Video of the Year	«Karma» by Yin-Yang, directed by Badoev	Won
2011	RU.TV Russian Music Awards	Russia (national music award)	Special Prize: Best Music Video Director	special award for his entire work	Won
2011	RU.TV Russian Music Awards	Russia (national music award)	Best Music Video of the Year	«Снег» («Sneg»/«Snow») by Philipp Kirkorov, directed by Badoev	Nominated
2011	RU.TV Russian Music Awards	Russia (national music award)	Best Music Video of the Year	«Небеса» («Nebesa» / «Heaven») by Valery Meladze, directed by Badoev	Nominated
2011	1st YUNA Award Ceremony The Best of 20 Years	Ukraine (national award)	Best Music Video of the past 20 Years	«Снег» («Sneg»/«Snow») by Iryna Bilyk, directed by Badoev	Nominated
2011	1st YUNA Award Ceremony The Best of 20 Years	Ukraine (national award)	Best Music Video of the past 20 Years	«Поцелуи» («Potselui»/«Kisses») by VIA Gra, directed by Badoev	Nominated
2011	Baltic Music Awards	Latvia (international award)	Best Music Video of the Year	«Теряю тебя» («Teryayu tebya»/«I'm Losing You») by Max Barskih, directed by Badoev	Won
2011	Baltic Music Awards	Latvia (international award)	Best Music Video of the Year	«Снег» («Sneg»/«Snow») by Philipp Kirkorov, directed by Badoev	Nominated
2012	Muz-TV Awards	Russia (national award)	Best Music Video of the Year	«Снег» («Sneg»/«Snow») by Philipp Kirkorov, directed by Badoev	Won
2012	Odesa International Film Festival	Ukraine (international award)	Best Short Film	Short film Jealousy, written and directed by Badoev	Nominated
2012	34th Moscow International Film Festival	Russia (international award)	Best Short Film	Short film Jealousy, written and directed by Badoev	Nominated
2012	YUNA Awards	Ukraine (national award)	Best Music Video of the Year	«Z.Dance» by Max Barskih, directed by Badoev	Nominated
2012	YUNA Awards	Ukraine (national award)	Best Music Video of the Year	« Алло, мам» (« Allo, mam»/« Hello, Mom») by VIA Gra, directed by Badoev	Nominated
2013	RU.TV Russian Music Awards	Russia (national music award)	Best Music Video of the Year	«Нет» («Net»/«Not») by Polina Gagarina, directed by Badoev	Won
2013	RU.TV Russian Music Awards	Russia (national music award)	Best Music Video of the Year	«Свет уходящего солнца» («Svet ukhodyashchego solntsa»/«The Light of the Setting Sun») by Valery Meladze, directed by Badoev	Nominated
2014	RU.TV Russian Music Awards	Russia (national award)	Sexiest Music Video of the Year	«Перемирие» («Peremiriye»/«Truce») by VIA Gra, directed by Badoev	Nominated
2014	Muz-TV Awards	Russia (national award)	Best Music Video of the Year	«Не теряй меня» («Ne teryay menya»/«Don't Lose Me» ) by Valery Meladze, directed by Badoev	Won
2014	Muz-TV Awards	Russia (national award)	Best Music Video of the Year	«Навек» («Navek»/«Forever» ) by Polina Gagarina, directed by Badoev	Nominated
2015	RU.TV Russian Music Awards	Russia (national award)	Best Music Video of the Year	«Мой воздух, моя любовь» («Moy vozdukh, moya lyubov'»/«My Air, my Love») by Anita Tsoy, directed by Badoev	Nominated
2015	Muz-TV Awards	Russia (national music award)	Best Music Video of the Year	«Мой воздух, моя любовь» («Moy vozdukh, moya lyubov'»/«My Air, my Love») by Anita Tsoy, directed by Badoev	Won
2015	Muz-TV Awards	Russia (national music award)	Best Music Video of the Year	«Свободный полет» («Svobodnyy polet»/«Free Flight» ) by Valery Meladze, directed by Badoev	Nominated
2015	M1 Music Awards	Ukraine (national award)	Best Music Video Director	award for his work in general	Won
2016	RU.TV Russian Music Awards	Russia (national award)	Best Music Video of the Year	«Плачь» («Plach'»/«Cry») by Dan Balan, directed by Badoev	Nominated
2016	RU.TV Russian Music Awards	Russia (national award)	Sexiest Music Video of the Year	«Пока, милый!» ( «Poka, milyy!» /«Bye honey!» ) by Anna Sedokova, directed by Badoev	Won
2016	Fashion People Awards 2016	Russia (national award)	Most Stylish Music Video of the Year	«Пока, милый!» ( «Poka, milyy!» /«Bye honey!» ) by Anna Sedokova, directed by Badoev	Won
2016	Muz-TV Awards	Russia (national award)	Best Music Video of the Year	«Без вещей» ( «Bez veshchey»/«Without Things) by Anita Tsoy, directed by Badoev	Won
2016	Muz-TV Awards	Russia (national award)	Best Music Video of the Year	«Шантарам» («Shantaram») by Anna Sedokova, directed by Badoev	Nominated
2016	M1 Music Awards	Ukraine (national award)	Best Music Video of the Year	«Последний летний день» («Posledniy letniy den'»/«Last Summer Day») by Max Barskih, directed by Badoev	Nominated
2016	M1 Music Awards	Ukraine (national award)	Best Cinematography	«Последний летний день» («Posledniy letniy den'»/«Last Summer Day») by Max Barskih, directed by Badoev	Won
2016	OOPS Awards	Russia (international award)	Best Music Video of the Year	« Пьяное солнце » («Pyanoye solntse /«Drunken Sun») by Alekseev, directed by Badoev	Won
2016	Russian Music Awards "Victoria"	Russia (national award)	Best Music Video of the Year	« Пьяное солнце » («Pyanoye solntse /«Drunken Sun») by Alekseev, directed by Badoev	Nominated
2017	RU.TV Russian Music Awards	Russia (national award)	Best Music Video of the Year	«Удержи моё сердце» («Uderzhi moyo serdtse»/«Hold my Heart») by Ani Lorak, directed by Badoev	Nominated
2017	RU.TV Russian Music Awards	Russia (national award)	Best Music Video of the Year shot abroad	«АСТАЛАВИСТА» («Astalavista») by Julia Parshuta, directed by Badoev (shot in Portugal)	Nominated
2017	RU.TV Russian Music Awards	Russia (national award)	Best Music Video of the Year shot abroad	«Миллиметры » («Millimetry» /«Millimeters» ) by Zara, directed by Badoev (shot in UAE)	Won
2017	Fashion People Awards	Russia (national award)	Fashion Music Video of the Year	«Миллиметры » («Millimetry» /«Millimeters» ) by Zara, directed by Badoev (shot in UAE)	Nominated
2017	Fashion People Awards	Russia (national award)	Fashion Music Video of the Year	«Океанами стали» (««Okeanami stali» /«Oceans Have Become») by Alekseev, directed by Badoev	Nominated
2017	Muz-TV Awards	Russia (national award)	Best Music Video of the Year	«Океанами стали» (««Okeanami stali» /«Oceans Have Become») by Alekseev, directed by Badoev	Nominated
2017	Muz-TV Awards	Russia (national award)	Best Music Video of the Year	«Разве ты любил» («Razve ty lyubil» /«Did you Love» ) by Ani Lorak, directed by Badoev	Nominated
2017	Muz-TV Awards	Russia (national award)	Best Music Video of the Year	«Целься в сердце» («Tsel'sya v serdtse»/«Aim at the Heart» ) by Anita Tsoy, directed by Badoev	Nominated
2017	M1 Music Awards	Ukraine (national award)	Best Music Video Director	award for his work in general	Won
2017	M1 Music Awards	Ukraine (national award)	Best Cinematography	«Ти в мені є» («Ty v meni ye»/«I have You») by Maria Yaremchuk, directed and edited by Badoev	Won
2017	M1 Music Awards	Ukraine (national award)	Best Music Video Editing	«Ти в мені є» («Ty v meni ye»/«I have You») by Maria Yaremchuk, directed and edited by Badoev	Won
2017	Eurosongs GoldStar Music Awards	Netherlands (international award)	Best Music Video	«Разве ты любил» («Razve ty lyubil»/«Di you Love» ) by Ani Lorak, directed by Badoev	Won
2017	Elle Style Awards Ukraine	Ukraine (national award)	Most Stylish Man of the Country	awarded for his personal fashion style	Won
2017	YUNA Awards	Ukraine (national award)	Best Music Video of the Year	«Моя любовь» («Moya lyubov'»/«My Love») by Max Barskih, directed by Badoev	Nominated
2017	Love Radio Awards	Russia (international award)	Best Music Video of the Year	«Моя любовь» («Moya lyubov'»/«My Love») by Max Barskih, directed by Badoev	Won
2018	RU.TV Russian Music Awards	Russia (national award)	Best Music Video of the Year	«Моя любовь» («Moya lyubov'»/«My Love») by Max Barskih, directed by Badoev	Won
2018	RU.TV Russian Music Awards	Russia (national award)	Best Music Video of the Year shot abroad	«Мир вашему дому » («Mir vashemu domu»/«Peace to your Home» ) by Zara, directed by Badoev (shot in Portugal )	Won
2018	RU.TV Russian Music Awards	Russia (national award)	Sexiest Music Video of the Year	«Вдох» («Vdokh»/«Inhale») by Elena Temnikova, directed by Badoev	Nominated
2018	Golden Firebird Awards	Ukraine (national award)	Best Music Video of the Year	«Шкода» («Shkoda»/«Damage») by Tayanna, directed by Badoev	Won
2018	Love Radio Awards	Russia (international award)	Best Music Video of the Year	«БЕРЕГА» («BEREGA»/«COAST») by Max Barskih, directed by Badoev	Nominated
2018	ZD Awards	Russia (national award)	Best Music Video of the Year	«БЕРЕГА» («BEREGA»/«COAST») by Max Barskih, directed by Badoev	Nominated
2018	Fashion People Awards	Russia (national award)	Fashion Video of the Year	«БЕРЕГА» («BEREGA»/«COAST») by Max Barskih, directed by Badoev	Nominated
2018	Fashion People Awards	Russia (national award)	Fashion Video of the Year	«Новый бывший» ( «Novyy byvshiy»/«New Ex ) by Ani Lorak, directed by Badoev	Nominated
2018	Muz-TV Awards	Russia (national award)	Best Female Music Video of the Year	«Новый бывший» ( «Novyy byvshiy»/«New Ex ) by Ani Lorak, directed by Badoev	Nominated
2018	Muz-TV Awards	Russia (national award)	Best Female Music Video of the Year	«Мир вашему дому » («Mir vashemu domu»/«Peace to your Home» ) by Zara, directed by Badoev	Won
2018	Muz-TV Awards	Russia (national award)	Best Male Music Video of the Year	«Моя любовь» («Moya lyubov'»/«My Love») by Max Barskih, directed by Badoev	Nominated
2018	M1 Music Awards	Ukraine (national award)	Best Music Video Director	award for his work in general	Won
2018	M1 Music Awards	Ukraine (national award)	Best Music Video of the Year	«#ЭТОМОЯНОЧЬ» («#ETOMOYANOCH'»» /«#THISISMYNIGHT» ) by NK, directed by Badoev	Won
2018	The Brightest Looks 2018	Ukraine (national award)	Fashionable Male	honored for his personal fashion style	Won
2018	Jäger Music Awards	Ukraine (national award)	Best Music Video of the Year	«STRUM» by Onuka, directed by Badoev	Nominated
2019	Social World Film Festival	Italy (international award)	Best Social Music Video of the Year	«STRUM» by Onuka, directed by Badoev	Nominated
2019	RU.TV Russian Music Awards	Russia (national award)	Best Music Video of the Year	«Сдавайся» («Sdavaysya»/«Give Up ») by Sergey Lazarev, directed by Badoev	Won
2019	RU.TV Russian Music Awards	Russia (national award)	Best Music Video of the Year	«Выше головы» («Vyshe golovy »/«Above the Head» ) by Polina Gagarina, directed by Badoev	Nominated
2019	RU.TV Russian Music Awards	Russia (national award)	Best Music Video of the Year to lyrics of Mikhail Gutseriev	«Я считаю шагами недели» («Ya schitayu shagami nedeli»/«I Count the Weeks by my Steps») by Kristina Orbakaitė, directed by Badoev	Nominated
2019	ZHARA Music Awards	Russia (national award)	Best Music Video of the Year	«Шантарам» («Shantaram») by Anna Sedokova, directed by Badoev	Nominated
2019	Fashion People Awards	Russia (national award)	Fashion Music Video of the Year	«Негордая» («Negordaya»/«Unhappy» ) by Zara, directed by Badoev	Won
2019	M1 Music Awards	Ukraine (national award)	Best Music Video Director	award for his work in general	Won
2019	M1 Music Awards	Ukraine (national award)	Best Music Video of the Year	«Камень и вода» ( «Kamen' i voda» / «Stone and Water» ) by Alekseev, directed by Badoev	Nominated
2019	M1 Music Awards	Ukraine (national award)	Best Music Video of the Year	«Disco Girl» by KADNAY, directed by Badoev	Nominated
2019	Musecube Music Awards	Russia (national award)	awarded as one of the best music videos of the year	«Любовь уставших лебедей» («Lyubov' ustavshikh lebedey»/«Love of Tired Swans») by Dimash Kudaibergen, directed by Badoev	Won
2019	Victoria Music Awards	Russia (national award)	Best Music Video of the Year	«БЕРЕГА» («BEREGA»/«COAST») by Max Barskih, directed by Badoev	Nominated
2020	Top Hit Music Awards	Russia (national award)	Music Video of the Year	«БЕРЕГА» («BEREGA»/«COAST») by Max Barskih, directed by Badoev	Won
2020	ZHARA Music Awards	Russia (national award)	Best Music Video of the Year	«Beverly Hills» by Zivert, directed by Badoev	Pending
