= Beri i begi =

"Bery y begy"

Single by Zivert
- Language: Russian
- English title: Take & Run
- Released: October 13, 2023
- Genre: disco; French house
- Length: 3:31
- Songwriters: Yulia Zivert, Bogdan Leonovich, Arkadys Kotkovs

"Bery y begy" (Russian: «Бери и беги») is a song by Russian singer Zivert, released on 13 October 2023 as the lead single of her album «В мире весёлых." The singer emphasized that the main idea of the composition is self-acceptance, and called it "a song of encouragement, a message to everyone who is afraid to take a step in the right direction or has not yet realized the value of every moment."

== Nominations ==
At the 13th RU.TV channel awards, "Beri y begy" was nominated for "Best Song" and "Best Video Clip."
