= VK Fest =

Russian music festival

- Dates: 2015-present
- Locations: Moscow, Saint Petersburg, Sochi, Novosibirsk, Vladivostok

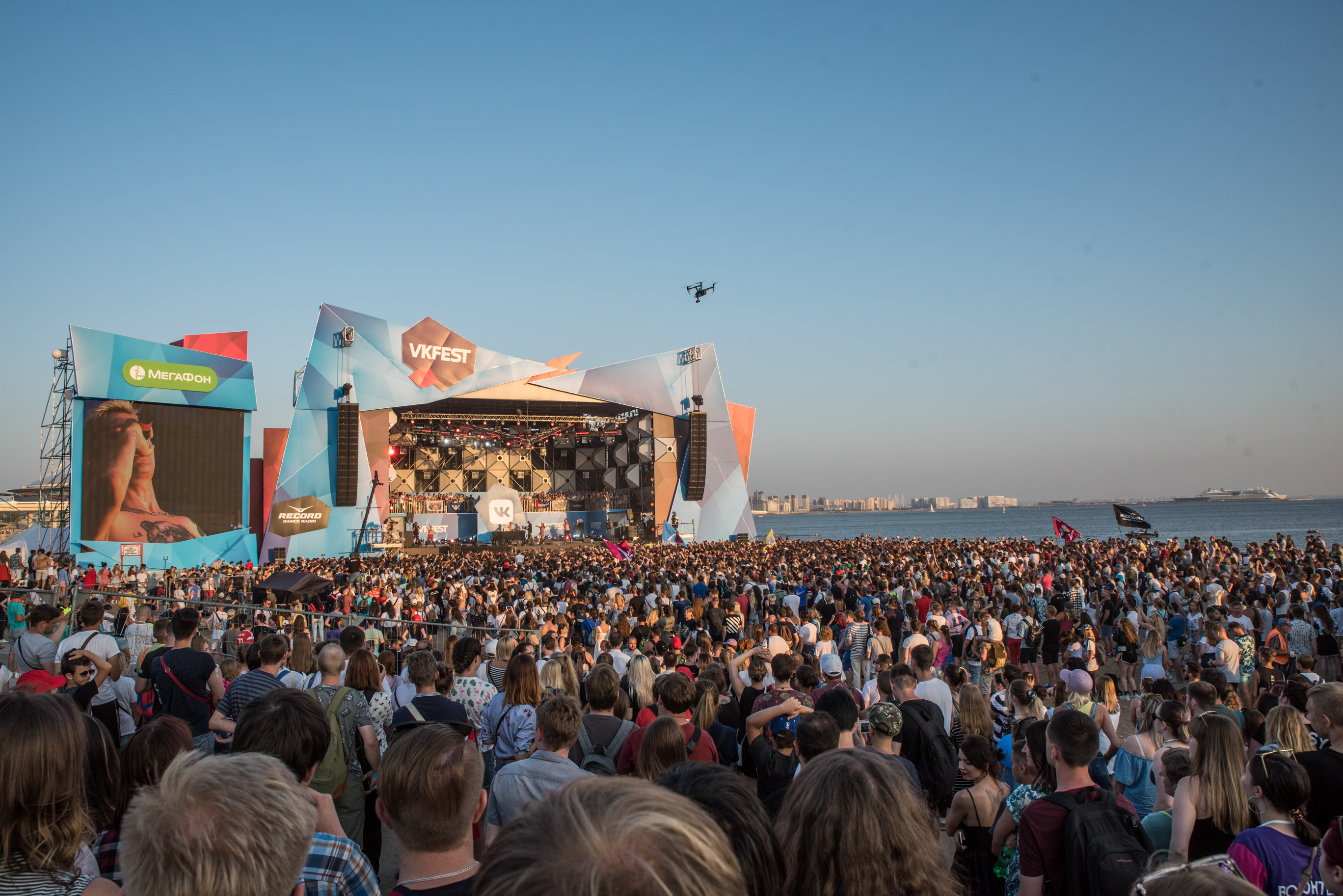
VK Fest audience, 2018

VK Fest is an open air music festival, organized by the social networks "VK" and "Radio Record" in 2015. It usually takes place on a July weekend in Saint Petersburg.

== History ==
According to the organizers, at the 2016 festival there were 70 thousand people, and in 2017, there were 85 thousand people.

In 2017, on three musical stages were performances by around 40 musicians, among whom were Mumiy Troll, Elena Temnikova, Max Barskih, «Zveri», Jah Khalib, Big Russian Boss, Svetlana Loboda, Neuromonakh Feofan, Max Korzh, Bi-2, Noize MC, Kasta, The Hatters, and Little Big. Speeches from bloggers and famous people made up a big part of the festival; among the speakers from that same 2017 festival include Sergey Druzhko, Olga Buzova, Anna Sedokova, Dmitry Grishin, Egor Beroev, Timur Bekmambetov, Elena Letuchaya, and Mikhail Piotrovsky. More than 1.5 million viewers watched the live broadcast of the festival.

In 2022, the festival was jointly held in three cities: Saint Petersburg, Sochi and in Moscow.

In 2023, VK Fest took place on different days in five cities: 17 June in Vladivostok, 24 June in Novosibirsk, 1 and 2 July in Saint Petersburg, 8 July in Sochi, and 15 and 16 July in Moscow.
