= Zelyonye volny =

"Zelënye volny"

Single by Zivert

from the EP Siyay
- Language: Russian
- Released: May 14, 2018
- Genre: Pop
- Length: 3:43

"Zelënye volny" (Russian: "Зелёные волны") is a single by Russian singer Zivert, released on 14 May 2018 as the second single from her first EP Siyay.

== Music video ==
The video, released on 24 October 2018, was done in aesthetics capturing the 1980s.
