= Max Barskih =

Ukrainian singer-songwriter (born 1990)

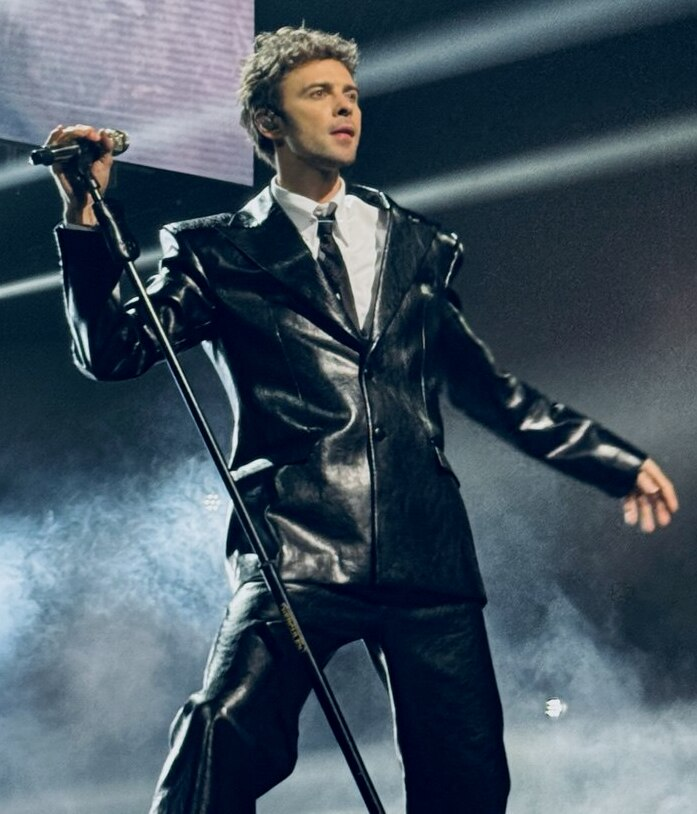
- Barskih in 2025

Background information
- Also known as: Max Barsky, Mickolai
- Born: Mykola Mykolaiovych Bortnyk; 8 March 1990 (age 36); Kherson, Ukrainian SSR (now Ukraine)
- Genres: Pop, dance-pop, electropop
- Occupations: Singer
- Years active: 2008–present
- Label: Sony
- Website: www.maxbarskih.com

Mykola Mykolaiovych Bortnyk (Ukrainian: Микола Миколайович Бортник, born 8 March 1990), better known by his stage name Max Barskih (Ukrainian: Макс Барських) and alter-ego Mickolai, is a Ukrainian singer and songwriter.

He has released seven studio albums, one compilation album and two extended plays.

== Early life ==
Max Barskih was born on 8 March 1990 in Kherson, Ukraine. He was raised in his birthplace, and moved to Kyiv after graduation. He is the youngest of three children and has an older brother and a sister. During his childhood, his parents were often away on business trips. According to Barskih, his family was rather poor as a result of to his father's actions; he preferred socializing with friends to raising his children. Barskih has stated that he has negative childhood memories connected to his father's alcoholism and physical violence. His mother and older brother often fought with his father when he would attempt to carry out "discipline" after a night of drinking.

When Barskih was 11, his father left the family, and his mother continued to raise him and his siblings alone. Barskih did not see or communicate with his father again until he was 27, when the two unsuccessfully attempted to reconnect.

== Career ==
Max Barskih rose to fame in Ukraine and post-Soviet countries in 2008 as a participant of the Ukrainian talent show "Fabryka Zirok 2" (Star Factory 2).

In 2010, Max Barskih was awarded "Best Ukrainian Act" at the MTV Europe Music Awards, marking his first major award win.

Barskih also made his acting debut in 2010 in Lara Fabian's musical feature film Mademoiselle Zhivago (then released in 2013).

In 2012, Barskih entered the Eurovision Song Contest Auditions for Ukraine with the English version of his song "Dance", but narrowly lost to Gaitana who represented Ukraine in Baku with her song "Be My Guest".

Max Barskih has won numerous awards, including "Singer of the Year" Awards at the Baltic Music Awards 2011, the "Crystal Microphone" Awards 2011, the M1 Music Awards 2017, the GQ Men of the Year Awards 2018, the New Radio Awards 2019, the Love Radio Awards 2019 and at the Top Hit Music Awards 2020.

Forbes Magazine USA and Vogue Ukraine have called Barskih "the most internationally successful Russian language singer".

Throughout his career, Barskih has worked closely with Alan Badoev, who is his producer and has also directed most of his music videos. Barskih's videos have gained popularity in the Commonwealth of Independent States. The director likes to use a variety of visual effects for many of his videos, such as in the music videos for "Теряю тебя" ("Lost in Love") which was released in 3D format in the CIS nations.

Barskih composes the music and writes the lyrics of his songs himself (and was e.g. nominated at the 2019 Russian National Music Awards for "Lyricist of the Year"), and partly also does the producing. Most of his songs are in Russian, but he has also sung in Ukrainian (e.g. "Небо" and "Двоє") and in English (e.g. "Z.Dance" (partly in English) and "Silence" (entirely in English)).

During the 2022 Russian invasion of Ukraine, Barskih joined the Armed Forces of Ukraine.

In summer 2023, he started a world tour in support of Ukraine from Lisbon.

== Discography ==
=== Studio albums ===
- 1:MAX BARSKIH (2009)
- Z.Dance (2012)
- По Фрейду (By Freud, 2014)
- Туманы (Mists, 2016)
- 7 (2019)
- 1990 (2020)
- Зорепад (2023)

=== Compilation albums ===
- Words (2015)

=== EPs ===
- Mickolai – EP (2015)
- Місто дощів (2025)

=== Singles ===
- 2009: S.L. (Suka Lyubov') [Love is a bitch]
- 2009: Пусто (Pusto) [Empty]
- 2009: DVD (with Natalia Mogilevskaya)
- 2010: Агония (Agoniya) [Agony]
- 2010: Сердце бьётся (Serdtse Byotsya) [Heart is Beating] (with Svetlana Loboda)
- 2010: Студент (Student)
- 2011: Lost in Love | Теряю тебя (Terayu Tebya) [Losing you]
- 2011: Белый ворон (Beliy Voron) [White Raven]
- 2011: Atoms | Глаза-убийцы (Glaza-ubiytsi) [Eyes of a Killer]
- 2011: Downtown
- 2011: Dance
- 2012: F**K OFF
- 2012: Higher
- 2012: Alive | Пылай (Pylay) [Blaze]
- 2012: I Wanna Run | Я болею тобой (Ya boleyu toboy) [I'm a fan of you]
- 2013: По Фрейду (By Freud)
- 2013: Какой была твоя любовь? (What was your love?)
- 2013: Hero_in
- 2013: Небо (Sky)
- 2014: Отпусти (Let Me Go)
- 2014: Всё серьёзно (Everything's Serious)
- 2015: Хочу танцевать (I Want To Dance)
- 2015: Подруга – Ночь (Night is my friend)
- 2016: Займёмся Любовью (Let's Make Love)
- 2016: Последний летний день (Last Day of Summer)
- 2016: Туманы (Mists)
- 2016: Неверная (Unfaithful)
- 2017: Моя любовь (My love)
- 2017: Февраль (February)
- 2018: Берега (Shores)
- 2019: Неслучайно (For a Reason)
- 2019: Лей, не жалей (Pour, Have No Regrets)
- 2020: Небо льёт дождем (Sky is Raining)
- 2020: ПО СЕКРЕТY (In Secret)
- 2020: Silence
- 2021: Bestseller (with Zivert)
- 2021: Tequila Sunrise
- 2022: Don't Fuck With Ukraine

== Other ventures ==
=== Songwriting ===
Barskih writes his songs himself and occasionally also works as a songwriter for other artists.

Selected list of songs written by Max Barskih for other artists
Year	Artist	Title	Remarks
2010	Svetlana Loboda	«Сердце бьётся» («Serdtse b'yotsya»/«Heart Beats»)	
2012	Misha Romanova	«Невесомая» («Nevesomaya»/«Weightless»)	
2012	Misha Romanova	«Не верь мне» («Ne ver' mne»/«Don't Believe Me»)	
2014	Tina Karol	«Любила» («Lyubila»/«Loved»)	
2015	Natalia Mohylevska	«Всё хорошо» («Vso khorosho»/«Things are good»)	
2016	Kristina Orbakaitė	«Ты мой» («Ty moy»/«You are My»)	
2016	Ani Lorak	«Удержи мое сердце» («Uderzhi moye serdtse»/«Hold my Heart»)	Won New Radio "Major League" Award and Golden Gramophone Award
2017	Tayanna	«I Love You»	Barskih also produced the song
2019	Misha Romanova	«MAKEUP»	Barskih also produced the song and directed and produced the music video
2019	Misha Romanova	«Лунная» («Lunnaya»/«Lunar» )	Barskih also produced the song
2019	Misha Romanova	«Помада» («Pomada»/«Pomade»)	Barskih also produced the song
2019	Misha Romanova	«MAXIM»	Barskih also produced the song and directed and produced the music video
2019	Misha Romanova	«Зачем?» («Zachem?»/«What for?»)	Barskih also produced the song
2020	Misha Romanova	«Кино» («Kino»/«Movie» )	Barskih also produced the song
2020	Misha Romanova	«Ты» («Ty»/«You» )	Barskih also produced the song

=== Acting ===
Barskih has starred as an actor in two musical feature films.

== Filmography ==
Acting roles in movies
Year	Production type	Title	Language	Role	Remarks
2012	Musical feature film	Z.Dance(ru)	Russian and English	Main role	Featured all songs of Barskih's «Z.Dance» album; Directed by Alan Badoev
2013	Musical feature film	Mademoiselle Zhivago	French and Russian	Supporting role (played Lara Fabian's lover)	Starring Lara Fabian in the main role; Featured all songs of Fabian's «Mademoiselle Zhivago» album; Filmed in 2010; Directed by Alan Badoev

Appearances on TV shows
Year	English title	Original title	Production type	Role	Remarks
2008	"Star Factory" Ukraine (Season 2)	Ukrainian: «Фабрика зірок»/«Fabrika Zirok»	Singing talent show	Participant	Finished on 6th place (was disqualified after a scandal)
2012	"Star Factory" Russia (Season 9)	Russian: «Фабрика звёзд»/«Fabrika Zvyozd»	Singing talent show	Member of the "Ukrainian National Team"	Special season of the show in which the best graduates of the Russian and Ukrainian versions of "Star Factory" competed against each other in "national teams"
2017	"Dancing with the Stars" Ukraine (Season 5), Final	Ukrainian: «Танці з зірками»/«Tantsi z Zykarmi»	Celebrity dancing show	Guest appearance	Guest appearance in the 5th Season's Final
2019	X-Factor Ukraine (Season 10), Final	Ukrainian: «Ікс-Фактор»/«X-Factor»	Singing talent show	Guest performance	Guest performance in the 10th Season's Final; Performed his songs «Февраль» (in a duet with the show's finalist Maria Stopnyk) and «Лей, не жалей»

== Awards and nominations ==
Year	Award	Country	Category	Work	Result
2010	MTV Europe Music Awards 2010	Spain (international award)	Best Ukrainian Act		Won
2011	MTV Europe Music Awards 2011	Northern Ireland (international award)	Best Ukrainian Act		Nominated
2011	Baltic Music Awards	Latvia (international award)	Best Male Singer of the Year		Won
2011	Baltic Music Awards	Latvia (international award)	Best Song of the Year	«Теряю тебя» («Teryayu tebya»/«I'm Losing You»)	Won
2011	Baltic Music Awards	Latvia (international award)	Best Baltic Music Video of the Year	«Теряю тебя» («Teryayu tebya»/«I'm Losing You»), directed by Alan Badoev	Won
2011	Baltic Music Awards	Latvia (international award)	Best Music Video of the Year World-Wide	«Теряю тебя» («Teryayu tebya»/«I'm Losing You»), directed by Alan Badoev	Nominated
2011	Baltic Music Awards	Latvia (international award)	Most Stylish Artist of the Year		Nominated
2011	Europa Plus Live Festival	Russia (national award)	Newcomer of the Year		Won
2011	Crystal Microphone Awards	Russia (national award)	Singer of the Year		Won
2011	Crystal Microphone Awards	Russia (national award)	Special Prize: Pro-European Artist		Won
2011	Golden Gramophone Awards	Ukraine (national award)	Golden Gramophone	«Агония» («Agoniya»/ «Аgony»)	Won
2011	ZD Awards	Russia (national award)	Sexiest Male Singer of the Year		Won
2012	YUNA Awards	Ukraine (national award)	Best Male Performer of the Year		Nominated
2012	YUNA Awards	Ukraine (national award)	Best Music Video of the Year	«Z.Dance», directed by Alan Badoev	Nominated
2012	Muz-TV Awards	Russia (national award)	Breakthrough of the Year		Won
2012	RU.TV Russian Music Awards	Russia (national award)	Creative Production of the Year	«Глаза-убийцы» («Glaza-ubiytsy»/«Killer Eyes»)	Nominated
2013	YUNA Awards	Ukraine (national award)	Best Male Performer of the Year		Nominated
2013	Pesnya Goda Gala	Russia (national award)	awarded one of the best songs of the year	«Небо» ( «Nebo»/«Sky»)	Won
2014	YUNA Awards	Ukraine (national award)	Best Male Performer of the Year		Nominated
2014	Inter TV Song of the Year Awards	Ukraine (national award)	Song of the Year	«Отпусти» («Otpusti»/«Let Me Go»)	Won
2015	YUNA Awards	Ukraine (national award)	Best Solo Artist of the Year		Nominated
2015	M1 Music Awards	Ukraine (national award)	Male Singer of the Year		Won
2016	M1 Music Awards	Ukraine (national award)	Male Singer of the Year		Nominated
2016	M1 Music Awards	Ukraine (national award)	Best Cinematography of the Year	«Последний летний день» («Posledniy letniy den'»/«Last Summer Day»), directed by Alan Badoev	Won
2016	M1 Music Awards	Ukraine (national award)	Best Music Video of the Year	«Последний летний день» («Posledniy letniy den'»/«Last Summer Day»), directed by Alan Badoev	Nominated
2016	YUNA Awards	Ukraine (national award)	Best Solo Artist of the Year		Nominated
2016	YUNA Awards	Ukraine (national award)	Best Album of the Year	«Туманы» («Tumany»/«Mists»)	Nominated
2017	RU.TV Russian Music Awards	Russia (national award)	Best Male Singer of the Year		Nominated
2017	Fashion People Awards	Russia (national award)	Most Fashionable Male Star of the Year		Won
2017	Fashion People Awards	Russia (national award)	Song of the Year	«Туманы» («Tumany»/«Mists»)	Nominated
2017	Muz-TV Awards	Russia (national award)	Best Song of the Year	«Туманы» («Tumany»/«Mists»)	Nominated
2017	Muz-TV Awards	Russia (national award)	Best Album of the Year	«Туманы» («Tumany»/«Mists»)	Nominated
2017	M1 Music Awards	Ukraine (national award)	Best Singer of the Year		Won
2017	M1 Music Awards	Ukraine (national award)	Hit of the Year	«Туманы» («Tumany»/«Mists»)	Won
2017	M1 Music Awards	Ukraine (national award)	Best Music Video Director	Alan Badoev for inter alia Mists	Won
2017	M1 Music Awards	Ukraine (national award)	Best PR Management	Secret Service Entertainment Agency for their artists Max Barskih and Tayanna	Won
2017	Music Box Awards	Russia (national award)	Song of the Year	«Туманы» («Tumany»/«Mists»)	Won
2017	MD Editors' Choice Awards	Russia (national award)	Most Popular Song of the Year	«Туманы» («Tumany»/«Mists»)	Won
2017	Golden Gramophone Awards	Russia (national award)	Golden Gramophone	«Туманы» («Tumany»/«Mists»)	Won
2017	VK Music Awards	Russia (international award)	was awarded as one of the most played songs of the year on the social network VK	«Туманы» («Tumany»/«Mists»)	Won
2017	BelMuzTV Awards	Belarus (international award)	Creative of the Year	«Моя любовь» («Moya lyubov'»/«My Love»)	Won
2017	Major League Awards	Russia (national award)	was awarded as one of the most popular songs of the year	«Моя любовь» («Moya lyubov'»/«My Love»)	Won
2017	YUNA Awards	Ukraine (national award)	Best Concert of the Year	«Туманы» («Tumany»/«Mists») Concert	Nominated
2017	YUNA Awards	Ukraine (national award)	Best Music Video of the Year	«Моя любовь» («Moya lyubov'»/«My Love»), directed by Alan Badoev	Nominated
2017	Love Radio Awards	Ukraine (national award)	Best Music Video of the Year	«Моя любовь» («Moya lyubov'»/«My Love»), directed by Alan Badoev	Won
2017	Love Radio Awards	Ukraine (national award)	Best Male Singer of the Year		Nominated
2018	RU.TV Russian Music Awards	Russia (national award)	Best Male Singer of the Year		Nominated
2018	RU.TV Russian Music Awards	Russia (national award)	Best Music Video of the Year	«Моя любовь» («Moya lyubov'»/«My Love»), directed by Alan Badoev	Won
2018	Top Hit Music Awards	Russia (national award)	Most Successful Song on the Radio of the Year	«Туманы» («Tumany»/«Mists»)	Won
2018	Major League Awards	Russia (national award)	was awarded as one of the most popular songs of the year	«Туманы» («Tumany»/«Mists»)	Won
2018	Love Radio Awards	Russia (international award)	Best Male Singer of the Year		Nominated
2018	Love Radio Awards	Russia (international award)	Best Concert of the Year	Solo concert in Megasport Arena	Nominated
2018	Love Radio Awards	Russia (international award)	Best Music Video of the Year	«БЕРЕГА» («BEREGA»/«SHORES»), directed by Alan Badoev	Nominated
2018	ZD Awards	Russia (national award)	Best Music Video of the Year	«БЕРЕГА» («BEREGA»/«SHORES»), directed by Alan Badoev	Nominated
2018	Fashion People Awards	Russia (national award)	Fashion Video of the Year	«БЕРЕГА» («BEREGA»/«SHORES»), directed by Alan Badoev	Nominated
2018	Fashion People Awards	Russia (national award)	Most Fashionable Male Singer of the Year		Nominated
2018	Viva! Awards	Ukraine (national award)	Most Beautiful Man of the Year		Nominated
2018	Music Box Awards	Russia (national award)	Singer of the Year		Nominated
2018	YUNA Awards	Ukraine (national award)	Best Male Performer of the Year		Nominated
2018	YUNA Awards	Ukraine (national award)	Best Foreign Language Song of the Year	«Сделай громче» («Sdelay gromche»/«Make it Louder»)	Nominated
2018	Golden Gramophone Awards	Russia (national award)	Golden Gramophone	«Моя любовь» («Moya lyubov'»/«My Love»)	Won
2018	GQ Men of the Year Awards	Russia (national award)	Male Musician of the Year		Won
2018	Muz-TV Awards	Russia (national award)	Best Male Music Video of the Year	«Моя любовь» («Moya lyubov'»/«My Love»), directed by Alan Badoev	Nominated
2019	New Radio Awards	Russia (national award)	Best Male Artist of the Year		Won
2019	RU.TV Russian Music Awards	Russia (national award)	Best Male Singer of the Year		Won
2019	RU.TV Russian Music Awards	Russia (national award)	Best Theme Song of the Year	«Полураздета» («Polurazdeta»/«Half-Dressed»; OST of Ukrainian cinema movie «Секс и ничего личного»/«Seks i nichego lichnogo»/«Sex And Nothing Personal»)	Nominated
2019	RU.TV Russian Music Awards	Russia (national award)	Best Concert of the Year	«Туманы» («Tumany»/«Mists») Concert (Megasport Arena)	Nominated
2019	Love Radio Awards	Russia (national award)	Male Singer of the Year		Won
2019	Top Hit Music Awards	Russia (national award)	Most Successful Male Singer on the Radio of the Year		Nominated
2019	Muz-TV Awards	Russia (national award)	Best Male Performer of the Year		Nominated
2019	Muz-TV Awards	Russia (national award)	Best Song of the Year	«БЕРЕГА» («BEREGA»/«SHORES»)	Nominated
2019	Muz-TV Awards	Russia (national award)	Best Concert of the Year	«Туманы» («Tumany»/«Mists») Concert (Megasport Arena)	Nominated
2019	High Five Awards	Russia (national award)	Male Singer of the Year		Nominated
2019	Russian National Music Awards (also known as "Victoria Awards")	Russia (national award)	Best Male Pop Singer of the Year		Nominated
2019	Russian National Music Awards (also known as "Victoria Awards")	Russia (national award)	Best Music Video of the Year	«БЕРЕГА» («BEREGA»/«SHORES»), directed by Alan Badoev	Nominated
2019	Russian National Music Awards (also known as "Victoria Awards")	Russia (national award)	Best Dance Hit of the Year	«БЕРЕГА» («BEREGA»/«SHORES»)	Nominated
2019	Russian National Music Awards (also known as "Victoria Awards")	Russia (national award)	Best Lyricist of the Year	«БЕРЕГА» («BEREGA»/«SHORES»)	Nominated
2019	Golden Gramophone Awards	Russia (national award)	Golden Gramophone	«БЕРЕГА» («BEREGA»/«SHORES»)	Won
2019	YUNA Awards	Ukraine (national award)	Best Male Performer of the Year		Pending
2019	YUNA Awards	Ukraine (national award)	Best Foreign Language Song of the Year	«Неземная» («Nieziemnaja»/«Unearthly»)	Pending
2019	YUNA Awards	Ukraine (national award)	Best Album of the Year	«7»	Pending
2019	YUNA Awards	Ukraine (national award)	Best Concert Show of the Year	«7» Concert	Pending
2020	New Radio Awards	Russia (national award)	Best Male Artist of the Year		Nominated
2020	Golden Gramophone Awards	Russia (national award)	Grand Prix	«Лей, не жалей» («Ley, ne zhaley»/«Lei, don't have regrets»)|	Pending
2020	Top Hit Music Awards	Russia (national award)	Special Prize: Most Successful Song on the Radio of the Year and of the Decade	«Лей, не жалей» («Ley, ne zhaley»/«Lei, don't have regrets»)|	Won
2020	Top Hit Music Awards	Russia (national award)	Most Popular Singer on the Radio of the Year		Won
2020	Top Hit Music Awards	Russia (national award)	Music Video of the Year	«БЕРЕГА» («BEREGA»/«SHORES»), directed by Alan Badoev	Won
2020	ZHARA Music Awards	Russia (national award)	Best Male Singer of the Year		Pending
2020	ZHARA Music Awards	Russia (national award)	Best Album of the Year	«7»	Pending
