= Bestseller (song) =

Single by Max Barskih feat. Zivert
- Language: Russian
- Released: March 19, 2021
- Genre: Dance pop
- Length: 3:43
- Label: Sony Entertainment, Pervoye muzykalnoe

"Bestseller" is a single by Ukrainian singer Max Barskih and Russian singer Zivert, released on 19 March 2021.

The song was nominated for a national music award and three YUNA awards.

== Promotion ==
Barskih and Zivert presented the song for the first time on TV on the show Evening Urgant on 18 March 2021, where they were the guests of the evening, and two days later Barskih performed the piece individually at the Ukrainian version of Lip Sync Battle, and the following week the two artists sang it together again for Radio Energy and AvtoRadio. On May 22, Bestseller was performed at RU.TV 2021.

== Charts ==
=== Weekly charts ===
Weekly chart performance
Chart (2021–2024)	Peak position
Bulgaria Airplay (PROPHON)	3
Kazakhstan Airplay (TopHit)	43
Lithuania (AGATA)	98
Russia Airplay (TopHit)	2
Ukraine Airplay (TopHit)	16

=== Year-end charts ===
Year-end chart performance
Chart (2021)	Position
Bulgaria (Prophon)	6
Russia Airplay (TopHit)	26
Ukraine Airplay (TopHit)	78
Chart (2023)	Position
Kazakhstan Airplay (TopHit)	81
Chart (2024)	Position
Kazakhstan Airplay (TopHit)	157

=== Decade-end charts ===
Decade-end chart performance
Chart (2020–2029)	Position
Kazakhstan Airplay (TopHit)	18
