= Serghey Grey =

Russian music video director (born 1988)

- Сергей Грей
- Born: Sergey Spynu; May 23, 1988 (age 38); Bălți, Moldavian SSR, Soviet Union (now Moldova)
- Occupations: Music video director; film director; producer
- Years active: 2010–present

Sergei Spynu (Russian: Сергей Спыну; born 23 May 1988, Bălți) better known professionally as Serghey Grey, is a Russian filmmaker, director and producer, better known for his work with artists like Mari Kraimbrery, Till Lindemann, Regina Todorenko, Artur Pirozhkov, Vladimir Presnyakov Jr., Yolka and others.

== Biography ==
Sergey Gray was born on May 23, 1988, in Bălți. He began his career as a music video director in 2010.
