= Icegergert =

Russian rapper (born 2001)

Icegergert Айсге́ргерт
- Born: Georgy Yevgenyevich Gergert; August 24, 2001 (age 25); Bratsk, Irkutsk Oblast, Russia
- Genre: Hip hop
- Occupation: rapper
- Years active: 2018-present
- Label: Gaz

Icegergert (Russian: Айсге́ргерт), real name Georgy Evgenyvich Gergert (Russian: Гео́ргий Евге́ньевич Ге́ргерт; born August 24, 2001, Bratsk) is a Russian rapper. He was nominated for Forbes' "30 Under 30" in the "Music" category (2025).

== Biography ==
=== Early years ===
Georgy got his surname Gergert from his grandfather of German descent.

=== Career ===
In 2018, he began writing lyrics for rap battles while studying. He's been recording tracks since 2019. In 2021 he released the single "Полукровка."

== Incidents ==
=== Conflict with the streamer Tsar ===
In the spring of 2025, streamer Tsar wanted to take a photo with Icegergert, but Icegergert demanded 3,000 rubles and then sent the streamer away, sparking a conflict. The artist later publicly apologized to Tsar.

== Awards and nominations ==
Year	Award	Nomination	Result	
2025	«30 under 30»	Music	Nominated	
2025	«VK Музыка»	«Takeoff of the year»	Won	.
2026	«Жара Music Awards»	Breakthrough of the year	Won	
2026	«Премия Муз-ТВ»	Best song	Won	
2026	«Премия Муз-ТВ»	«Choice of VK Музыки»	Won	
2026	VOICE Influencer Awards	Rap artist of the year	Won	
