= Niletto =

Russian singer (born 1991)

Niletto Данил Сергеевич Прытков
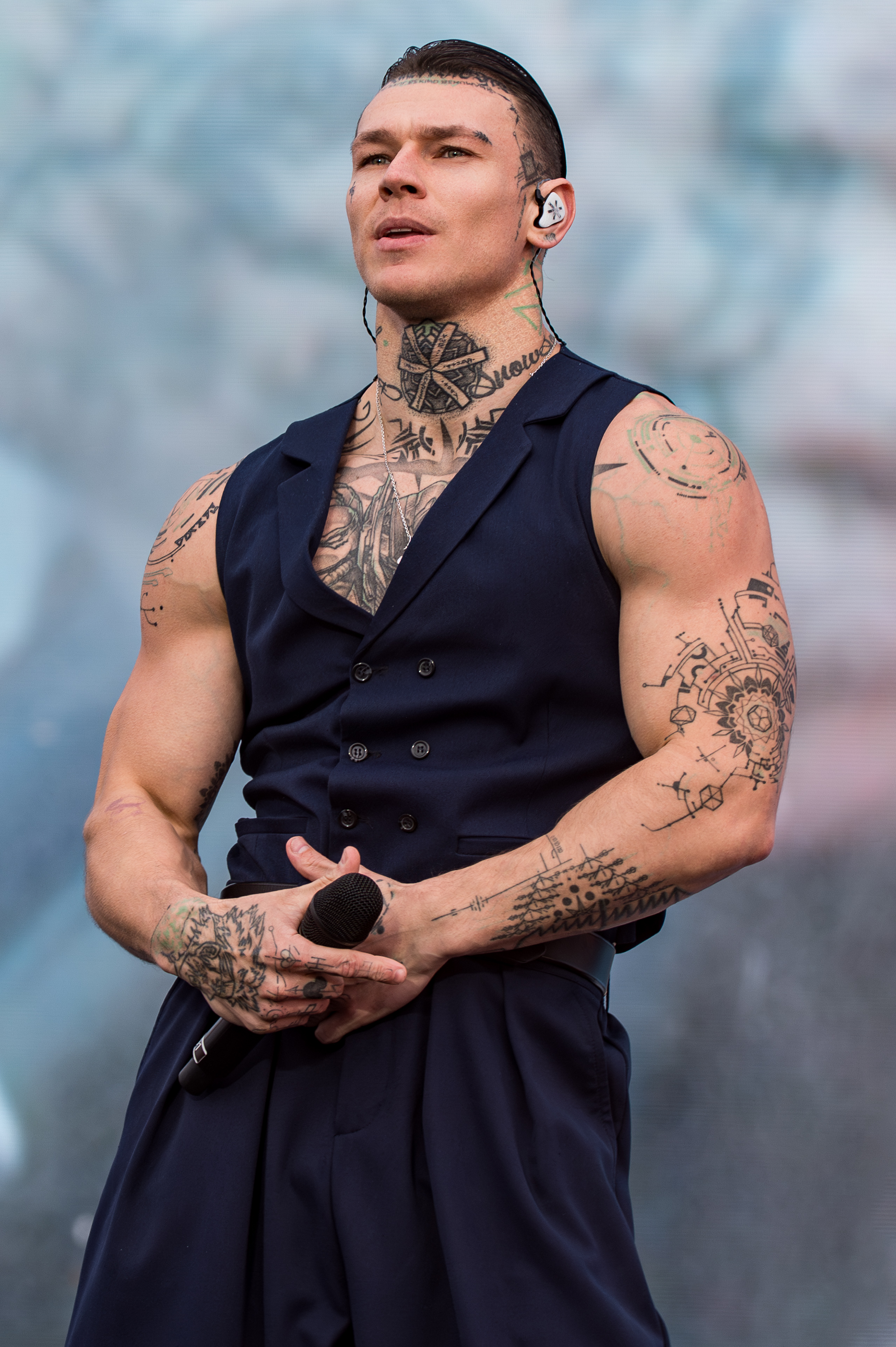
- Niletto at VK Fest (2025)

Background information
- Born: Danil Sergeevich Prytkov; October 1, 1991 (age 34); Tyumen, Russia
- Occupations: singer; dancer; musician
- Years active: 2010-present
- Labels: Zion Music, Союз Мьюзик

Danil Sergeyevich Prytkov (Russian: Данил Серге́евич Прытко́в; born 1 October 1991, Tyumen), better known by his stage name Niletto, is a Russian singer and dancer. He is a member of the project «Песни» on the channel ТНТ (seasons 1 & 2), and is also a member of «Русский ниндзя» on «Channel One Russia».

== Biography ==
Niletto was born on 1 October 1991 in Tyumen into a Russian family, his parents are Svetlana and Sergei and he has two older sisters. He did not spend much time in Perm. Until he was seven years old he lived and studied in Yekaterinburg and in 2018, he moved to Moscow.

On 6 June 2020 Niletto wrote in his blog a call for new constitutional amendments, which caused a stir among fans and the media. After revealing it was part of the Comment Out show, Niletto deleted the video.

== Filmography ==
*In 2018, Niletto starred in the film "Бойцовая воля" as the rapper Max.

*In 2021 Niletto made a cameo appearance in the film "Евгенич".

== Discography ==
=== Studio albums ===
- «Криолит»

=== Mini-albums ===
- «Хентай»
- And There We Go
- «Ляля»
- «Голос черновиков»
- «Простым»
- «юбилейный 30»

== Awards and nominations ==
| Year | Organization | Nomination | Nominee/Work | Result | Refs. |
|---|---|---|---|---|---|
| 2020 | Премия OK | New faces of music | Niletto | Nominated | |
| 2020 | MTV Europe Music Awards | Best Russian Singer | Niletto | Won | |
| 2020 | Golden Gramophone | — | «Любимка» | Won | |
| 2021 | Top Hit Music Awards | Best singer on YouTube | Niletto | Won | |
| 2021 | RU.TV Award | Best start | Niletto | Won | |
| 2021 | Премия Муз-ТВ 2021 | Best collaboration | «Краш» | Won | |
| 2021 | Премия Муз-ТВ 2021 | Best song | «Любимка» | Nominated | |
| 2021 | Премия Муз-ТВ 2021 | Best singer | Niletto | Nominated | |
