= FDR Media =

- Industry: Music industry & Media
- Founded: 1998; 28 years ago in Kyiv, Ukraine
- Founder: Vadym Karpyak

FDR Media (Ukrainian: ФДР медіа) is a Ukrainian media company that provides specialized services for radio stations, television channels, and recording artists. Established in 1998, it has become a central hub for music distribution, airplay monitoring, and industry analytics in the Ukrainian music market.

== History ==
The company was founded in 1998 in Kyiv. Its original mission was to support the development of Radio Stolytsi (Ukrainian: Радіо Столиці), one of Ukraine's first alternative format radio stations.

In early 1999, Radio Stolytsi's investors decided to change the station's musical direction, leading to a mass resignation of the creative staff, several of whom chose to focus exclusively on developing FDR as an independent media service provider serving the broader Ukrainian broadcasting market.

== Charts ==
=== Current charts ===
- FDR Top 40 Radio Airplay Chart

== Impact ==
FDR plays a significant role in tracking the development of the Ukrainian-language music market. In 2021, the company reported a historical milestone when, for the first time in its 19-year history of publishing the "FDR Top 40" year-end chart, the top three most-played songs in Ukraine were all performed in Ukrainian.
