= Muz-TV =

Russian music TV channel

Muz-TV Муз-ТВ
- Country: Russia
- Broadcast area: Russia, CIS, Asia-Pacific and Europe
- Headquarters: Moscow, Russia

Programming
- Language: Russian
- Picture format: 16:9 (576i, SDTV)

Ownership
- Owner: National Media Group
- Sister channels: Solntse, Yu

History
- Launched: March 20, 1995; 31 years ago
- Former names: 1994-1996: Cosmos-10

Links
- Website: muz-tv.ru

Availability

Terrestrial
- Digital terrestrial television: Channel 20

Muz-TV (Russian: Муз-ТВ, from Музыкальное телевидение - Music Television) is a Russian music TV channel, broadcasting since 1996. It is largely modelled after western MTV and predates launching of MTV Russia in 1998. Muz-TV was founded by Sergey Lisovsky and Boris Zosimov. The CEO of Muz-TV is Zakhar Babin.

In 2011, Muz-TV is owned by UTH Russia, which is, in turn, 49% owned by MTV. In 2024, Ivan Tavrin's Kismet Group agreed to sell media assets, including the Muz-TV and Yu TV channels, as well as the radio station Choose Radio, to a group of investors including Media Telecom (JV Rostelecom and National Media Group).

Muz-TV's format is Russian pop music videos, although international pop, hip-hop and contemporary R&B can be occasionally seen as well. There are charts for both local and international acts, voted via channel's website.

Much like MTV, in the late 2000s Muz-TV became more an entertainment channel broadcasting reality shows, rather than a music channel. After the re-branding of 16 September 2012 "Muz-TV" has moved to a new frequency, changing the concept back to the "musical" On its old frequency, a new youth entertainment channel "U", which consists of programs previously aired on the Muz-TV (except musical programs), as well as new programs and series, both purchased and own production.

On December 14, 2012, the Muz-TV channel became free again, and received the right to broadcast on digital television.

== Muz-TV Music Awards ==
Annual Muz-TV music awards is presented to Russian pop musicians since 2003. For each nomination, three nominees are chosen by the channel's jury, and then nominees are voted via SMS. The Awards were presented annually during a show in Olimpiysky until the venue's demolishment. Subsequent galas were held in the Megasport Sport Palace in Moscow. In 2014, the Awards travelled for a once-off to Astana, Kazakhstan.

Muz-TV music awards is object of sharp criticism in media. The major issue is a repetitive list of nominees, for example, Zveri have been awarded "Best rock act" six times in a row, and Dima Bilan became "Artist of the Year" five times in six years. Another issue is lip syncing on the award ceremony.

=== 2021 Muz-TV Awards controversy ===
In 2021, the award ceremony led to widespread controversy in Russian music industry as some musical producers called out the show for missing its focus on music, including Maxim Fadeev, Viktor Drobysh and Iosif Prigozhin. Muz-TV presenter and singer Arthur Pirozhkov winning the award for Best Singer caused a stir among the audience. Nominee Morgenshtern stormed the stage while Pirozhkov was receiving his award and sounded his disagreement with the result. On multiple occasions during the show, Morgenshtern sounded of his disappointment. During the remainder of the gala several attendees, including Timati and Egor Kreed, spoke out their surprise for Morgenshtern not winning the award.

=== Russian gay propaganda law fine ===
Meanwhile, the show was left investigated for breaking the Russian gay propaganda law, after pop star Philipp Kirkorov and rapper Dava entered the red carpet as part of a bridal procession with only men. In 2021, Moscow's Basmanny District Court fined Muz-TV 1 million rubles ($13,750), the maximum fine for the penalty.
