= Pervoye muzykalnoye =

Russian record label

Pervoye muzykalnoye izdatelstvo
- Founded: 1996; 30 years ago
- Distributor: Zvonko Digital
- Country of origin: Russia
- Location: Moscow
- Official website: 1mp.ru

Pervoye muzykalnoye izdatelstvo (Russian: Первое музыкальное издательство), more commonly shortened to Pervoye muzykalnoye, is a Russian record label. Artists include Valery Meladze, Kristina Orbakaitė, Chicherina, Mark Tishman, Timur Rodriguez, Yulia Parshuta, Zivert and others.

From 1996 to 2001, the publishing house was part of a SOYUZ group of companies. It is distributed digitally through Zvonko Digital.

== History ==
On April 4, 2022, the Music Industry Association (AMI) was founded jointly with Velvet Music and Gazgolder. Valery Drobysh, owner of the rock label OSUMA and son of Viktor Drobysh, was appointed CEO for a five-year term.
