= Dimash Qudaibergen =

Kazakh musician (born 1994)

- Димаш Құдайберген
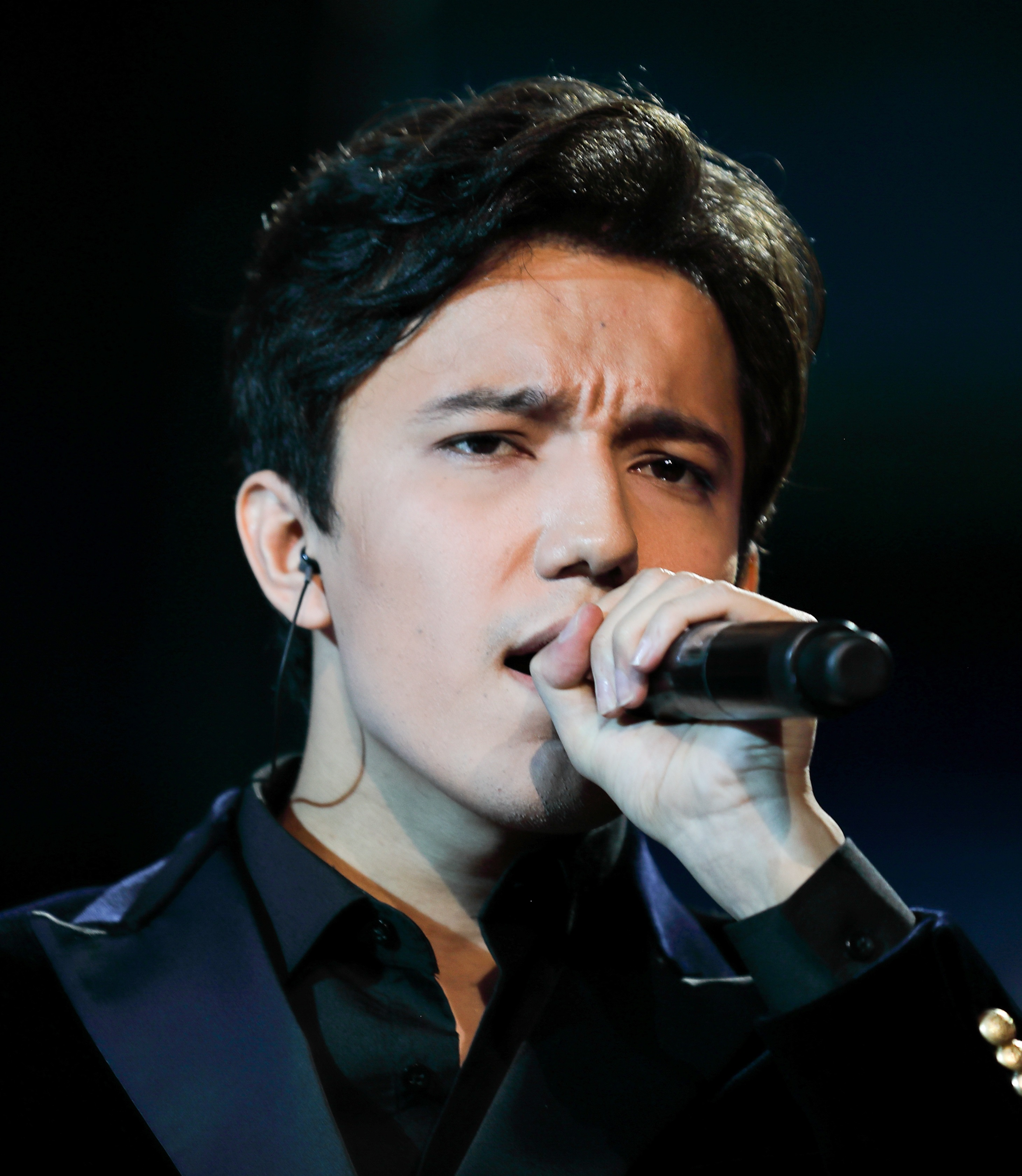
- Qudaibergen in 2019
- Born: Dinmukhammed Qanatuly Qudaibergen; 24 May 1994 (age 32); Aktobe, Kazakhstan
- Other names: Dimash (Димаш); Dimash Kudaibergenov (Russian: Димаш Кудайбергенов); Dimaxi (Chinese: 迪玛希)
- Education: Ahmet Zhubanov Music College in Aktobe; Kazakh National University of Arts in Astana
- Occupations: Singer-songwriter; multi-instrumentalist
- Awards: View full list
- Musical career
- Genres: Classical crossover; pop; folk; classical; world; operatic pop
- Instruments: Vocals; piano; dombra; drums
- Years active: 2010–present
- Website: en.dimashnews.com

Dinmukhammed Qanatuly Qudaibergen (Note: Kazakh: Дінмұхаммед Қанатұлы Құдайберген, romanized: Dınmūhammed Qanatūly Qūdaibergen, [ˌdɘnmʊχɑmˈmʲet qɑˌnɑtʊˈɫɤ qʊˌdɑjbʲerˈgʲen]) (born 24 May 1994), known professionally as Dimash Qudaibergen (Note: /dɪˈmɑːʃ kʊˌdaɪbɛərˈɡɛn/; Kazakh: Димаш Құдайберген / Dimaş Qūdaibergen, pronounced [dɯjˈmɑʃ qʊˌdɑjbʲerˈgʲen]) and mononymously as Dimash (/dɪˈmɑːʃ/ dih-MAHSH), is a Kazakh singer, songwriter, and multi-instrumentalist. He is university-trained in classical as well as contemporary music, and is known for his exceptionally wide vocal range. He has performed songs in 16 languages.

Although offered a position at the Astana Opera, he decided to pursue a career in contemporary music, mixing classical elements and traditional Kazakh music with pop music.

He gained significant popularity in Kazakhstan and other post-Soviet countries in 2015 upon becoming the Grand Prix winner of Slavianski Bazaar in Vitebsk, Belarus. He rose to fame in China with his participation as a "wildcard competitor" in Hunan TV's Singer 2017 (Chinese: 歌手2017), finishing second overall.

== Early life ==
Dinmukhammed Qanatuly Qudaibergen was born on 24 May 1994 in Aktobe, to Qanat Qūdaibergenūly Aitbaev (Kazakh: Қанат Құдайбергенұлы Айтбаев) and Svetlana Aitbaeva (Kazakh: Светлана Айтбаева). He is a Muslim. His father previously led the regional Cultural Development Board of Aktobe. His mother is a soprano singer at the Aktobe Philharmonic Society, a Member of the Standing Committee on Social and Cultural Development (Deputy of Maslihat of Aktobe region) and artistic director of the children's studio Saz in the Aktobe Region.

Qudaibergen has a younger sister named Raushan and a younger brother named Abilmansur, who is also a musician, songwriter, guitarist, pianist and drummer.

Qudaibergen was brought up in a close-knit musical family, and his grandparents played a major role in his upbringing, which followed largely traditional Kazakh customs.

Qudaibergen began performing at a young age, singing and playing the piano. His first appearance on stage was at the age of two in a minor role in a local theatre production. At home, Qudaibergen took an interest in musical instruments, and his parents and his music teacher noticed that he had absolute pitch. At the age of five, he began to take piano and vocal lessons at the children's studio of the local music college. Qudaibergen first sang on stage the same year, at the age of five. Aged six, in 2000, he won the national piano contest Aynalayin.

== Education ==
At the age of five, he began taking violin and singing lessons at the children's studio of the Aktobe Music College, where he would later attend, accompanied by his grandmother Miua. He has expressed gratitude to his early teachers and to his grandmother, who took him to his lessons every day despite the pain in her legs. Dimash first sang on stage the same year, at the age of five. He later attended Gymnasium No. 32 in Aktobe. Dimash completed a Broadway Musical master class in 2009.

In 2014, he graduated in Classical Music with a specialization in voice (Bel Canto) from the Akhmet Zhubanov Aktobe Music College Aktobe and began his studies in Contemporary Music (jazz, pop) in the Kazakh National University of Arts in Astana, where he graduated with a major in Voice on 27 June 2018.

On 18 June 2020, he graduated from the same university with a master's degree in Composition by defending his master's thesis with a perfect score and received a recommendation for admission to doctoral studies in music.

In December 2022, Dimash became the owner of the Bolashak International Scholarship.

== Career ==
He began singing and playing the piano in various places and competitions throughout his childhood. At the age of six, in 2000, he won the national piano contest Aynalayin.

=== 2010–2014: Early career ===
From 2010 to 2013, Dimash participated in and won four major singing competitions, in Kazakhstan (Sonorous Voices of Baikonur, 2010, and Zhas Kanat, 2012), Ukraine (Oriental Bazaar, 2012), and Kyrgyzstan (Meikin Asia, 2013).

With winning the prestigious National Zhas Kanat Contest in 2012, Dimash gained for the first time wide attention from the Kazakh national media. He won the three-day vocal competition with a full jury score of 180 out of 180 points; the first time in the history of the contest.

In 2013, he was invited to perform as a guest singer at the Türkçevizyon Gala Night in Denizli, Turkey.

As a teenager, Dimash also became involved in taekwondo and swimming. During this time he composed the music for two of his future hits, "Körkemim" (Kazakh: Көркемім) with lyrics written by his father and "Unforgettable Day" based on a poem by Baisengir. Dimash also recorded three music videos, two versions of Körkemim (2013, 2014) and "Daididau" (2014).

In 2014, he graduated from the Zhubanov Music College in Aktobe and began his studies in Astana at the Kazakh National University of Arts at the faculty of "Pop Art". Dimash continued performing in public and even participated in a concert for the Day of Teacher. On 30 December 2014, he received an award from the Daryn State Youth Award.

=== 2015–2016: Slavianski Bazaar, international performances and Unforgettable Day Tour ===
Following his graduation, Dimash performed in various European and Asian countries. In 2015, he was invited to participate at the Slavic Bazaar in Vitebsk, Belarus, an annual international contest for prominent singers, after one of the organizers had seen him perform live in Kazakhstan. Dimash went on to win the Grand Prix on 13 July 2015, with a score of 175 points out of 180. During the three days of the contest, he was the clear favorite of both the jury and audience. With his original renditions of the Kazakh folk song "Daididau", the Russian singer Alla Pugacheva's "Blizzard Again" (Russian: Опять Метель) and the French singer Daniel Balavoine's "SOS d'un terrien en détresse", he gained wide recognition from the jury and international media. Chairman of the jury, Polad Bülbüloğlu, stated that Dimash possessed three voices in one: a low and medium voice, and altino, a rare voice, and that he used all of them professionally.

Upon winning Slavianski Bazaar, Qudaibergen regularly appeared in national TV shows and public events. His guest performances included at Expo 2015 in Milan, Italy; at the theatrical show Mangilik El, dedicated to the 550th anniversary of the Kazakh Khanate; at the 2015 Eurasia International Film Festival in Almaty; and at an Astana Opera Concert that was attended by the Chinese President Xi Jinping.

Dimash released his second own composition "Unforgettable Day" in August 2015. In October 2015, Qudaibergen was selected to represent Kazakhstan at the 2015 ABU TV Song Festival in Istanbul, Turkey. Dimash performed "Daididau", receiving a standing ovation. In November, Dimash performed at the closing ceremony of the Culture and Arts Capital of the Turkic World festival in Mary, Turkmenistan.

He released his self-titled debut extended play (EP) on 1 January 2016. Dimash appeared on various TV shows singing "My Swan" (Kazakh: Аққуым) in a duet with Mayra Muhammad-kyzy. In February 2016, his rendition of "Daididau" was selected by the European Broadcasting Union to represent Kazakhstan in their "Around the World in 80 Minutes of Music" program dedicated to the World Radio Day 2016 that was played by radio stations around the world. In March, Dimash sang with his parents at the Women's Day concert in Astana, and took part in the "All Stars for My Beloved" concert dedicated to International Women's Day at the Kremlin Palace in Moscow. In March and April, he went on tour with the Kazakh University of Arts Symphony Orchestra in Vienna, Austria; Maribor, Slovenia; and Belgrade, Serbia, performing "SOS d'un terrien en détresse" and "Daididau".

Dimash had his first headlined tour from April to December 2016, in celebration of the 25th anniversary of independence of Kazakhstan. Dimash achieved 21 out of the 27 total planned concerts in 25 regions of Kazakhstan, which also included two additional concerts in the cities of Kazan and Ufa in Russia. He named his tour Unforgettable Day, after his own song by the same name. The concerts consisted of a wide variety of songs in various languages. He received the "Pop Artist" award at the People's Favorite ceremony in Kazakhstan.

In July 2016, he was invited to perform at the Slavic Bazaar opening ceremony in Belarus, where he sang a duet with Nagima Eskalieva, and was also honored to raise the flag of the festival. In 2016, Qudaibergen also served as a judge at Bala Dausy 2016 (Voice of Children 2016).

Other performance highlights of Dimash in 2016 included his guest performance at the annual Zhas Kanat Contest; and his performances of "Diva Dance" at an Astana Day Concert that was attended by the president of Kazakhstan; of the rap song "I Am Kazakh" (with Yerbolat and Alashuly) at Almaty's 1000th Birthday Gala Concert; at a UNESCO event in Paris, France; his performance at the Turkic Culture Festival in Seoul, South Korea, performing for the presidents of South Korea, Kazakhstan, Turkey, Kyrgyzstan, Azerbaijan, and Turkmenistan; and he represented Kazakhstan, alongside baritone Sundet Baigozhin, as a guest singer at the Big Opera 2016 TV competition in Russia.

In November 2016, the director of Astana Opera State Theatre, Toleubek Alpiyev, invited Qudaibergen to work as an opera singer, stating that his voice would be "ideal for baroque opera", but he decided to pursue a career in contemporary music.

=== 2017: Singer, success in China and solo concert Bastau ===
In early 2017, Dimash appeared in the fifth season of Hunan Television's I Am a Singer (Chinese: 歌手2017), under the recommendation of director Hong Tao, and signed a contract with Black Gold Talent in Beijing. At 22, he was the youngest participant in the history of the show, and competed against professional and top-selling Chinese singers as a 'wildcard' competitor. Dimash's mother later said that he hoped to reach at least the middle stage of the competition.

He won Episodes 1, 2 and 6, with his performances of "S.O.S d'un terrien en détresse", "Opera 2", and "Adagio". He made it to the finals, and finished as runner-up to Hong Kong singer Sandy Lam.

Singer 2017 – Ranking of Dimash Qudaibergen
Episode	Round	Broadcast date	Song title	Original singer	Song introduction	Ranking	Remarks
1	Qualifier Round 1	21 January 2017	"A Soul's Plea for Help" (French: SOS d'un terrien en détresse)	Daniel Balavoine	Lyrics: Luc Plamondon; Composer: Michel Berger; Arranger: Kubert Leung	1	1st place in Singer voting
2	Knockout Round 1	28 January 2017	"Opera 2" (Russian: Опера 2)	Vitas	Lyrics: Vitas, V. Borovsky; Composer: Vitas; Arranger: Da Ridan	1	1st place in Overall Ranking
3	Challenge Round 1	4 February 2017	"The Show Must Go On"	Queen	Lyrics: Brian May; Composer: Queen; Arranger: Erlan Bekchurin	3	1st place in Overall Ranking
4	Knockout Round 2	11 February 2017	"Late Autumn" (Chinese: 秋意浓)	Jacky Cheung	Lyrics: Daryl Yao; Composer: Kōji Tamaki; Arranger: Samal Ermakhanov	3	2nd place in Overall ranking
5	Challenge Round 2	18 February 2017	"Uptown Funk"	Mark Ronson, Bruno Mars	Lyrics／Composer: Devon Christopher Gallaspy, Mark Ronson, Bruno Mars, Nicholas Williams, Philip Martin Lawrence II, Jeff Bhasker; Arranger: Kid	6	
6	Knockout Round 3	25 February 2017	"Adagio" (English)	Lara Fabian	Lyrics／Composer: Remo Giazotto, Rick Allison, Lara Fabian, Dave Pickell; Arranger: Erlan Bekchurin	1	2nd place in Overall ranking
7	Qualifier Round 3	4 March 2017	"Daididau" (Kazakh: Дайдидау)	Unknown	Lyrics: Мағжан Жұмабаев Composer: Unknown; Arranger: Erlan Bekchurin, Bakytbek Zeinelov	3	
8	Knockout Round 4	11 March 2017	"Daybreak" (Chinese: 天亮了)	Han Hong	Lyrics／Composer: Han Hong; Arranger: Erlan Bekchurin	5	
9	Challenge Round 4	18 March 2017	"All by Myself"	Eric Carmen	Lyrics: Eric Carmen; Composer: Eric Carmen, Sergei Rachmaninoff; Arranger: Erlan Bekchurin	2	
10	Knockout Round 5	25 March 2017	"Unforgettable Day" (Kazakh: Ұмытылмас күн)	Dimash Qudaibergen	Lyrics: Oral Baisengir (Kazakh); Composer: Dimash Qudaibergen; Arranger: Erlan Bekchurin	3	1st place in Overall ranking
10	Knockout Round 5	25 March 2017	"Unforgettable Day" (Kazakh: Ұмытылмас күн)	Dimash Qudaibergen	Lyrics: Kaysha Tabarakkyzy (Mandarin); Composer: Dimash Qudaibergen; Arranger: Erlan Bekchurin	3	1st place in Overall ranking
11	Breakout Round	1 April 2017	Exempted (did not perform this week by virtue of being first-round singer)				
12	Semi-finals	8 April 2017	"Confessa" (Italian)	Adriano Celentano	Lyrics: Mogol (Italian); Composer: Gianni Bella; Arranger: Erlan Bekchurin	2	—
12	Semi-finals	8 April 2017	"Confessa" (Italian)	Adriano Celentano	Lyrics: Tang Tian (Mandarin); Composer: Gianni Bella; Arranger: Erlan Bekchurin	2	—
12	Semi-finals	8 April 2017	"The Diva Dance"	Inva Mula Tchako	Composer: Éric Serra; Arranger: Erlan Bekchurin	2	—
13	Grand Finals	15 April 2017	"A Tribute to MJ" medley		Arranger: Erlan Bekchurin, Chen Di	2	Duet with Laure Shang; 2nd place Overall ranking of semi-final and finals (and runner-up of Singer 2017)
13	Grand Finals	15 April 2017	"The Way You Make Me Feel"	Michael Jackson	Lyrics／Composer: Michael Jackson	2	Duet with Laure Shang; 2nd place Overall ranking of semi-final and finals (and runner-up of Singer 2017)
13	Grand Finals	15 April 2017	"Billie Jean"	Michael Jackson	Lyrics／Composer: Michael Jackson	2	Duet with Laure Shang; 2nd place Overall ranking of semi-final and finals (and runner-up of Singer 2017)
13	Grand Finals	15 April 2017	"Dangerous"	Michael Jackson	Lyrics／Composer: Michael Jackson; Bill Bottrell; Teddy Riley	2	Duet with Laure Shang; 2nd place Overall ranking of semi-final and finals (and runner-up of Singer 2017)
13	Grand Finals	15 April 2017	"Earth Song"	Michael Jackson	Lyrics／Composer: Michael Jackson	2	Duet with Laure Shang; 2nd place Overall ranking of semi-final and finals (and runner-up of Singer 2017)
14	2017 Biennial Concert	22 April 2017	"Give Me Love" (Kazakh: Маxаббат Бер Маған)	Dimash Qudaibergen	Lyrics: Munaydar Balmolda; Composer: Аigül Bajanova; Arranger: Erlan Bekchurin	—	

In Episode 1 of Singer 2017, Dimash sang "SOS d'un terrien en détresse". After winning this episode, Dimash's name became prominent in social media and his success made headlines in China, Kazakhstan as well as French media and TV programs.

Dimash also won Episode 2 with his version of Vitas' "Opera 2", and came in third in Episode 3 with his rendition of Queen's "The Show Must Go On". Hunan TV and the Chinese media named him "a bridge for Kazakh-Chinese cultural cooperation". Between the recordings of Episodes 3 and 4, Dimash performed at the 2017 Winter Universiade Opening Ceremony, singing Sarah Brightman's "A Question of Honor" with Zarina Altynbayeva. He performed his first ever Mandarin song "Late Autumn" (Chinese: 秋意浓) in Episode 4 and ranked third. During the broadcast of Episode 4, Dimash's meeting with Jackie Chan, his childhood idol, was shown. He won Episode 6 with his rendition of Lara Fabian's "Adagio" – a performance which was praised by Fabian.

For Episode 7, Dimash performed his rendition of the traditional Kazakh folk song "Daididau", accompanied by the Folk Instrumental Ensemble of Dimash's university, the Kazakh National University of Arts. Dimash and the instrumentalists performed wearing traditional Kazakh costumes (shapan). He started the performance by playing a traditional piece named "Adai" (Kazakh: Адай) on the dombra, and then sang "Daididau". He came in third. His performance was received positively and sparked interest in Kazakh music and culture in China. Dimash later said in an interview that this gave him the opportunity to "make sure once again that music knows no boundaries". After the broadcast of Episode 7, a documentary about Dimash aired on Hunan TV.

Dimash sang his own song "Unforgettable Day" for Episode 10, with a section of the lyrics translated into Mandarin. He came third. Within a few days, "Unforgettable Day" reached the top of the Fresh Asia Music Charts. On 5 April, he released his first Chinese single "Eternal Memories" (Chinese: 拿不走的记忆), theme song of the movie Battle of Memories (Chinese: 记忆大师).

In Episode 12 of Singer, the semi-final, Dimash sang Adriano Celentano's "Confessa" in Italian, followed by "The Diva Dance" from the movie The Fifth Element. He placed second and was promoted to the final. On 12 April, he released his single "Go Go Power Rangers", theme song of the movie Power Rangers in China.

In the final of Singer 2017, Dimash sang "A Tribute to Michael Jackson" in a duet with Laure Shang. He finished Singer 2017 as runner-up. For the final episode of Singer 2017, Episode 14, the gala episode, Dimash performed a new song in Kazakh, "Give Me Love" (Kazakh: Маxаббат Бер Маған; Makhabbat Ber Magan).

During Singer, Dimash appeared on various Chinese TV programs, including "Happy Camp", My Boyfriend's A Superstar/Fan Fan Boyfriend and Come Sing with Me (where fans were selected to sing with their idol); and had many other performances in China. They included the Chinese Top Ten Music Awards in Shanghai, where he won his first Chinese Award, namely for "Best Asian Singer"; the Top Chinese Music Awards in Shenzhen, China, which are considered to be the Asian equivalent to the Grammy Awards, where he performed "Unforgettable Day" accompanied by Ouyang Nana on the piano, and won the "Most Popular International Singer" Award; and the Meeting on the Silk Road Gala, held by the Embassy of Kazakhstan and China's Department of Culture, in Beijing.

Upon returning to Kazakhstan after the completion of Singer 2017, he was welcomed with a congratulatory event in Astana.

Following Singer 2017, Dimash appeared and performed on numerous TV shows and public events in China, Kazakhstan and France.

His performances in France included his performance of "SOS d'un terrien en détresse" in the popular France 2 TV show Les Années Bonheur; his charity performances at the Global Gift Galas in Paris and Cannes (to which he was invited by the foundation's Honorary Chair Eva Longoria); at the Cannes Film Festival. and at the Ruhani Zhangyru UNESCO Gala in Paris.

On 27 June 2017, he held his first large-scale solo concert Bastau (Kazakh: Бастау) ("Beginning") in Astana, Kazakhstan. Most of the three-hour concert was accompanied by a live orchestra; guest singers included Terry Lin, Loreen, Sophie Ellis-Bextor and Marat Aitimov; and Dimash performed duets with Maira Mukhamedkyzy, Kristina Orbakaitė and with his parents, Svetlana Aitbayeva and Kanat Aitbayev. Along with popular pieces from Singer 2017 and pre-Singer, he also debuted his new songs "My Star" (Kazakh: Жұлдызым), "Without You" (Kazakh: Кім екен), "Last Word" (Kazakh: Сөз соңы), and "Leyla" (Kazakh: Лейла). Bastau was well-received and sold out to a crowd of around 30,000 people.

In July, Dimash's new song "Ocean over Time" (Chinese: 时光·沧海) was released in China as the theme song for the game Moonlight Blade, that later won a Hollywood Music in Media Award. In the same month, he sang at the closing ceremony of Slavic Bazaar in Vitebsk, Belarus, where his international career had started in 2015 and performed several songs for the audience of the 2017 Eurasia International Film Festival and its honorary guests Nicolas Cage and Adrien Brody.

On 16 September, Dimash performed as the headliner at the Gakku Open-Air Festival in Almaty, to a crowd of 150,000 people. Prior to this event, his highest recorded note was G♯7 in whistle register, on par with Mariah Carey. At the Gakku Festival, he surpassed himself by hitting D8 during "Unforgettable Day".

In 2017, the Kazakh figure skater Denis Ten, who was an Olympic medalist and friend of Dimash, began using his rendition of "SOS d'un terrien en détresse" for his skating programs. Later, after the skater's violent death due to an attempted robbery in July 2018, Dimash performed a tribute to him in his concert at Arnau, interpreting the song that Denis used as a musical background for his artistic performances.

=== 2018: Continued success in China and breakthrough in Russia ===
Dimash continued having numerous performances in China. To highlight a few: he performed "Flight of the Bumblebee" and "Auld Lang Syne" (in Mandarin), accompanied by pianists Wu Muye and Maksim Mrvica, at the CCTV Spring Festival Gala; "Jasmine" in a duet with the Grammy-winner Wu Tong at the Chinese New Year Gala; a rendition of Lionel Richie's "Hello" as a guest performer at Singer 2018; and "Daididau", accompanied by an orchestra, at the One Belt One Road Gala. He was invited as guest and performer at the "Choose Big Star" variety show; performed "You and Me" in a duet with Wáng Lì at the Chinese Mid Autumn Festival, and premiered his first English single "Screaming" at the "Idol Hits" show. In December, he performed his own composition "Unforgettable Day" at the Miss World 2018 Final, and Celine Dion's "My Heart Will Go On" at the Hainan International Film Festival.

Dimash also participated in the "PhantaCity" short video play, in which he starred as the main actor and performed "If I Never Breathe Again" and "When You Believe".

He held three solo concerts in 2018: two "D-Dynasty" concerts in Fuzhou, and Shenzhen; and a solo concert in London, within the scope of the "Kazakhstan Day of Culture".

In May, Dimash performed at the 71st Cannes Film Festival. In July, he appeared at the Slavic Bazaar 2018 in Vitebsk, Belarus, as a judge and guest performer, and sang "SOS d'un terrien en détresse". In September, he participated as a guest at the international contest for young pop singers New Wave in Sochi, Russia, where he performed "Sinful Passion" for the first time, and sang "Adagio" at the closing ceremony.

In 2018, he began collaborating with Russian producer and composer Igor Krutoy, who had a significant impact on Dimash's promotion in Russia and he was often seen on TV in Russia. This continued until February 2022. The day after the war between Russia and Ukraine began, he posted a black square on Instagram and wrote that he was in favor of peace. During the entire conflict, he never performed in Russia, canceled his performances in Belarus, and ended his collaboration with Igor Krutoy. However, they continue to communicate with each other and their families.

In November, his collaboration with the renowned Russian composer Igor Krutoy started with their first single "Love of Tired Swans" (Russian: "Любовь уставших лебедей", "Lyubov' ustavshikh lebedey"). Many performances in Russia followed and in December, at the annual "Pesnya Goda" Gala in Moscow, "Love of Tired Swans" was awarded one of the best songs of 2018.

=== 2019: The World's Best in the United States and solo concert Arnau ===
In January, he joined the Super Vocal TV competition for classical singers in China as a member of the judges.

In early 2019, Dimash participated in the CBS talent competition The World's Best, in which he was presented to the US audience as the "Six Octave Man" and "man with the world's widest vocal range". He performed "SOS d'un terrien en détresse" in the audition round and "All by Myself" in the battle round. Despite being listed as front-runner, Dimash withdrew from the competition in the champions round (semi-final), citing that he wished to leave the opportunity to younger performers, and after withdrawing he performed "Adagio" (the other two contestants of this round were the 13-year-old Indian pianist Lydian Nadhaswaram and the 12-year-old Kazakh singer Daneliya Tuleshova).

On 16 April 2019, Dimash performed 'SOS D'un Terrien En Detresse' at the inauguration ceremony of the Year of Kazakhstan in Tashkent, Uzbekistan.

In June, he released his first album, iD. It reached platinum status within 37 seconds after release, and triple-platinum within the first hour.

He held his second large-scale solo concert, Arnau (Kazakh: Арнау) (Dedication), in the Astana Arena in Astana, Kazakhstan, on 29 June, and the sell-out performance attracted 40,000 people.

This year, he continued his collaboration with Igor Krutoy with the songs "Mademoiselle Hyde", "Love is Like a Dream" (Russian: Любовь, похожая на сон), "Know" (Russian: Знай), "Olimpico" (also known as "Ogni Pietra"), "Where Love Lives" (Russian: Там, где живет любовь), "Passione", "Ulisse" (duet with Aida Garifullina), "Ti Amo Così" (with Aida Garifullina and Lara Fabian) and "Love of Tired Swans" (Russian: Любовь уставших лебедей). In October and November, he joined Krutoy as a guest performer on the Igor Krutoy Anniversary Tour, performing in New York City, Dubai, Minsk, and Düsseldorf.

On 5 December, Dimash was awarded "Best Vocalist in Classical Music" and won a Special Prize for "Discovery of the Year" at the Russian National Music Awards "Victoria" that are considered the Russian equivalent to the Grammy Awards. Dimash gave his first solo concert in the US on 10 December. The show was titled Arnau Envoy and took place at the Barclays Center in New York. The venue was sold out with 19,000 spectators from 63 countries.

Among Dimash's 2019 performances in Russia were his guest performances at the New Wave in Sochi, his headlining performance at the closing ceremony of the WorldSkills championships in Kazan, and the Igor Krutoy Anniversary Gala on Ice in Moscow.

He also had more performances in China, including a Queen medley that he performed with the Super Vocal finalists at Singer 2019; a headlining performance at the Mount Emei Music Festival; at the Asian Culture Carnival; the opening ceremony of the Jackie Chan International Action Film Week; at the Closing and Award Ceremony of the Silk Road International Film Festival; and a guest performance at Masked Singer China.

Other international performances included the premiere of his song "Olimpico" (also known as "Ogni Pietra") at the opening ceremony of the European Games in Minsk, Belarus; and he represented Kazakhstan at the 2019 ABU TV Song Festival in Tokyo, Japan, performing "SOS d'un terrien en détresse".

=== 2020: Arnau tour and appearance on MTV USA ===
In early 2020, he appeared on two movie soundtracks, singing Hāi pí yíxià (Chinese: 嗨皮一下) for Vanguard and Across Endless Dimensions, theme song of Creators: The Past.

In February, his Arnau Europe Tour started, but was interrupted in March due to the COVID-19 pandemic.

In May, he performed on live stream at Tokyo Jazz Festival (jp), and in June appeared on CCTV1's Everlasting Classics (zh) singing Tang dynasty poetry by Zhang Jiuling.

On 18 June 2020, IPZUSA, a company based in New Jersey, officially announced on its website that a contract had been signed with Qudaibergen, to provide family-focused management, representation and consulting.

On 30 September, it was announced that Dimash would debut a Kazakh language song, being the first artist from Kazakhstan to appear on the official YouTube channel of MTV USA. His songs continued to be ranked in the Top 5 by MTV USA Livestream for the next 10 weeks from 2 October to 18 December 2020. Interviews were broadcast on MTV USA YouTube Livestream with Dimash and Host Kevan Kenney between December 2020 and February 2021.

In November, Dimash was interviewed for Muz-TV, answering questions about his career and life.

On 3 December, it was announced that Qudaibergen would be presenting his first online digital concert on a global streaming platform, Tixr. The online concert Dimash Digital Show was to be a charity event, with part of the proceeds donated to Project C.U.R.E.

In December, Dimash released his new music video for "I Miss You" with the collaboration of the Russian director Evgeny Kuritsyn.

=== 2021: Dimash Digital Show ===
On 16 January, Dimash held his first online concert – Dimash Digital Show. His performance of "SOS d'un terrien en détresse", "War and Peace", along with 15 other songs, marked the artist's collaboration with Project C.U.R.E.

Later that week two special performances (on 17 January, "Samaltau", and on 20 January, "SOS d'un terrien en détresse") performed by Dimash were streamed by Sister Cities International for their 2021 Online Annual Gala Event, with the theme All Roads Lead to Diplomacy.

On 31 January, the single "Golden" music video by Dimash made its official debut via the Tixr American streaming platform immediately following the encore of the Dimash Digital Show on the same day.

From 15 January to 4 June 2021, Dimash continually received a Top 5 ranking from the MTV USA Friday Livestream. For 29 Weeks, from October 2020 to June 2021, there have been five top rated Dimash music videos streamed by MTV USA Friday Livestream to the North American market and around the world.

In March 2021 and May 2021, Dimash released videos of his singles for Kazakhstan celebrations, "Golden" for Nauryz, along with "Amanat" and "Kieli Meken", and "Qairan Elim" for Unity Day. In May 2021, he also released a new music video for "Across Endless Dimensions", the OST for the Italian movie Creators: The Past. In April 2021, Dimash released the single "Be With Me" and a new music video. The song originally premiered during his Dimash Digital Show on 16 January 2021. In June 2021, Dimash released a new instrumental "River of Love" along with eminent Kazakh composer, Renat Gaissin.

In November 2021, Dimash's song "Fly Away" took sixth place on Billboard's Hot Trending Songs, making the track one of the top 10 most mentioned songs on Twitter.

Also in November 2021, he performed "Ikanaide" (Japanese: いかないで) or "Don't Go" by Kōji Tamaki for the 20th Tokyo Jazz Festival. It was his first song in Japanese.

=== 2022: Dimash post-pandemic concerts in Dubai, Düsseldorf, Prague, Almaty ===
Dimash held his first solo live concert since the pandemic in Dubai, United Arab Emirates on 25 March 2022, at the Coca-Cola Arena. Then resumed two of his Arnau tours—in Düsseldorf on 9 April 2022, and Prague on 16 April 2022.

In July 2022, Dimash announced his new concert tour Stranger to be held in Almaty, Kazakhstan on 23 September 2022, at Almaty Arena in the city.

=== 2023: Stranger tour in Yerevan, Antalya, Malaysia, Hong Kong ===
The tour continued in Yerevan, Armenia on 29 April 2023, at Karen Demirchyan Complex, and in Antalya, Turkey on 6 May 2023 at Expo 2016 congress building.

Dimash made his Southeast Asian debut concert at Kuala Lumpur, Malaysia on 24 June 2023, at Axiata Arena.

In a concert in Hong Kong on 23 December, he premiered two songs to the surprise of his audience, "Smoke" and "When I've Got You".

=== 2024: Stranger tour continues in Budapest, Istanbul, Astana, Prague, Düsseldorf ===
In 2024, Dimash held solo concerts at Budapest, Hungary on 4 May 2024 at the Laszlo Pappa Sports Arena and at Istanbul, Turkey on 24 May 2024 at the Beşiktaş stadium, on the occasion of his 30th birthday. Dimash continued his Stranger tour with a two-day concert on 13 and 14 September 2024 at Astana Arena, Kazakhstan. He held concerts in Prague, Czech Republic on 22 November 2024 at the Sportovní hala Fortuna and Düsseldorf, Germany on 24 November 2024 at the PSD Bank Dome.

He also debuted as a judge on the International classical music competition Virtuosos Visegrad 4+.

=== 2025: Stranger tour in New York, Mexico, Barcelona, London, Berlin, Riga ===
In 2025, Dimash held solo concerts at New York (Madison Square Garden) on 5 October 2025, Mexico City on 8 October 2025 (Auditorio Nacional) and 10 October 2025 (Palacio De Los Deportes). He continued the tour at Barcelona (Olimpic Arena Badalona 8 November), London (OVO Arena Wembley 12 November 2025) and Berlin (Max-Schmeling-Halle 14 November 2025). The last Stranger concert was at Riga, Latvia (Xiaomi Area) on 12 December 2025.

On 5 April 2025, he performed at the Turksoy 2025 Cultural Capital Opening Ceremony concert (Aktau, Kazakhstan).

On 2 June 2025, He performed 'Adagio' with Lara Fabian at her concert in London.

He also performed on 6 July 2025 at the second anniversary of the Ho Guom Theatre, Hanoi, Vietnam with Placido Domingo, Kristine Opolais and the Sun Symphony Orchestra.

Dimash was invited to perform at 4th Meikin Asia International Festival of Popular Music Performers on the 22 and 23 July 2025 where he was presented an award 'People's Artist of Kyrgyzstan' by President Sadyr Zhaparov.

He then performed at the Nalati Music Festival on 10 August 2025.

Despite a busy year, Dimash had three "D & Dears" fan meetings; Almaty (26 May 2025), Barcelona (1 June 2025) and London (4 June 2025).

2025 was also Dimash's second year as a judge on the International classical music competition Virtuosos, notably the 10th Jubilee season of the program.

The United Nations' International Organization for Migration (IOM) appointed Dimash Qudaibergen as a Global Goodwill Ambassador during its annual Council session in Geneva.

=== 2026: Music performances continue, first award as producer ===
On 16 January 2026, Dimash performed at the opening and closing ceremonies of the 2026 Tmall NEWty Festival Offline Events in Shanghai, China.

He also participated as ambassador in the Freedom Inside Forum which was held in Astana on 9 April 2026.

Dimash received the Weibo Macau China Award for Annual Contribution to International Cultural Exchange, his first international award as a producer on April 11, marking a new milestone in his career, at the 2026 Weibo Gala in Macau.

On 18 April 2026, Dimash performed together with Placido Domingo at the 'Three Icons One Stage' concert, with the third artist Stjepan Hauser pulling out due to injuries. Other classical music stars who took to the stage were talents such as Yelena Dudochkin, Plácido Domingo Jr., Mansur Qudaibergen, Soma Balázs-Piri and Bence Bánkövi, with the 60-piece Budafok Dohnányi Orchestra, conducted by Péter Pejtsik and Eugene Kohn.

== Other ventures ==
=== Modeling ===
Dimash has been a model for fashion labels and for Lifestyle and Fashion magazines. He was on the magazine covers of Men's Health, Southern Metropolis, Starbox, Easy, L’Officiel Hommes, Ivyplume, Chic, Chic Teen, and Elle. He was also featured in photo series of other magazines, including Cosmopolitan and OnlyLady, and in fashion videos for e.g. Elle Shop and Cosmopolitan.

=== Acting ===
Dimash starred as an actor in several Chinese and Russian TV productions.

=== Singing contests ===
Dimash is the initiator in 2018 of the annual Kazakh Baqytty Bala Children's Singing Contest. He also served as a jury member for Bala Dausy, Slavic Bazaar, Super Vocal, New Wave, and music contest Virtuosos. In 2026, Dimash was executive producer for 'Voice Beyond Horizon' a program on Hunan TV channel which premiered on 5 February 2026.

== Awards and achievements ==
Contests
Date	Competition	Location	Result
2019 Feb–Mar	CBS talent competition show The World's Best	Hollywood, CA, United States	withdrew in semi-final
2017 Jan–Apr	Hunan TV Singer 2017	Changsha, China	2nd place
2015-07-(09–13)	International Festival of Arts Slavic Bazaar	Vitebsk, Belarus	Grand Prix
2013-07-19	International Festival of Young Performers Meikin Asia	Cholpon-Ata, Kyrgyzstan	Grand Prix
2012-09-09	International TV Contest of Young Performers Oriental Bazaar	Yalta, Ukraine	1st prize
2012-05-20	Republican Contest for Young Performers Under 30 Zhas Kanat	Astana, Kazakhstan	Grand Prix
2010	International Festival Sonorous Voices of Baikonur	Baikonur, Kazakhstan	1st place
2000	Republic Contest Aynalayin	Aktobe, Kazakhstan	1st place (category piano)

Awards
Date	Event	Location	Award
2025-01-16	National Award "Halyqtyn Suiktysy-2024" / "The People’s Favorite-2024"	Astana, Kazakhstan	"Cultural Figure Of The Year"
2024-11-26	DIAFA (Distinctive International Arab Festivals Awards)	Dubai, UAE	For contribution to the arts
2024-02-10	National Award 'National Lovely Person'	Astana, Kazakhstan	'National Lovely Person' - for the third time
2022-09-23	Annual Ticketon Awards	Almaty, Kazakhstan	"Kazakhstan Artist of the Year" and "Variety Concert of the Year"
2022-03-24	EMIGALA Fashion Awards	Dubai, UAE	"International Artist of The Year"
2020-06-29	Sina Awards	Beijing, China	"Most Popular Foreign Artist of the Year"
2020-04-23	Annual ZD Awards	Moscow, Russia	"Cover Song of the Year" Award for Qudaibergen's rendition of "Love is Like a Dream" (Russian: "Любовь, похожая на сон") (composed by Igor Krutoy and originally sung by Alla Pugacheva)
2020-03-03	Annual Ticketon Awards in the Field of Culture, Art and Sports	Almaty, Kazakhstan	"Pop Concert of the Year" Award for Qudaibergen's solo concert "Arnau"
2020-01-18	National People's Favorite Awards	Nur-Sultan, Kazakhstan	"Cultural Figure of the Year"
2020-01-11	JSTYLE China Attitude Trend Setting Awards	Pingyao, China	"Best Male Singer of the Year"
2019-12-26	10th DoNews RenRen Awards	Beijing, China	"Most Popular Foreign Artist of the Year"
2019-12-07	Annual Pesnya Goda Gala	Moscow, Russia	"Singer of the Year"
2019-12-07	Annual Pesnya Goda Gala	Moscow, Russia	Awards for the composer Igor Krutoy, the lyricist Lilia Vinogradova and the singer Qudaibergen for the song "Olimpico" (also known as "Ogni Pietra") as one of the best songs of the year
2019-12-07	Annual Pesnya Goda Gala	Moscow, Russia	Awards for the composer Igor Krutoy, the poet Mikail Gutseriev and the singer Qudaibergen for the song "Know" (Russian: "Знай") as one of the best songs of the year
2019-12-05	Russian National Music Awards "Victoria"	Moscow, Russia	"Best Vocalist of the Year in Classical Music"
2019-12-05	Russian National Music Awards "Victoria"	Moscow, Russia	Special Prize for "Discovery of the Year"
2018-12-16	The Silk Road Cohesion Awards	Shanghai, China	"Most Influential Singer of The Year"
2018-12-01	Annual Pesnya Goda Gala	Moscow, Russia	Awards for the composer Igor Krutoy, the poet Mikail Gutseriev and the singer Qudaibergen for the song "Love of Tired Swans" (Russian: "Любовь уставших лебедей") as one of the best songs of the year
2018-02-10	Top Global Chinese Music Awards	Beijing, China	"Most Popular Singer of the Year"
2018-02-01	Belt and Road International Brand Spring Festival Gala	Beijing, China	"Friendship Outstanding Contribution" Award
2018-01-27	Global Chinese Golden Chart Awards	Beijing, China	"Best Artist of the Year"
2018-01-18	Weibo Annual Awards	Beijing, China	"New Music Power of the Year"
2017-12-27	Golden Mango Star Awards	Changsha, China	"Most Popular Male Singer"
2017-12-21	Beauty Touching Annual Charity Gala	Beijing, China	"Best International Singer"
2017-12-02	iQIYI Awards Gala	Beijing, China	"Most Popular Male Singer"
2017-11-29	Times Awaken L'Officiel Fashion Night Gala	Beijing, China	"Leader of Innovation Time"
2017-11-14	Hollywood Music in Media Awards	Hollywood, US	Hollywood Music in Media Award for "Best Original Song" in the "Video Game" category for "Ocean Over The Time", the theme song of the online game "Moonlight Blade" (composer Thomas Parisch and singer Dimash Qudaibergen)
2017-08-27	Fresh Asia Music Awards	Beijing, China	"Best Overseas Male Star"
2017-08-27	Annual International Music Festival Astana Voice	Astana, Kazakhstan	"Astana Dausy" (Astana Voice)
2017-08-09	Chinese Golden Melody Festival	Hong Kong	"Favorite Male Singer"
2017-07-20	MTV Global Mandarin Music Awards	Shenzhen, China	"Most Popular Overseas Singer"
2017-07-19	Tencent MTV Asia Music Gala	Guangzhou, China	"Most Popular Overseas Award"
2017-05-26	OK! magazine Music Gala	Beijing, China	"Most Popular Singer of the Year"
2017-04-09	17th Top Chinese Music Awards	Shenzhen, China	"Most Popular International Singer"
2017-03-27	24th Chinese Top Ten Music Awards	Shanghai, China	"Best Asian Singer"
2017-03-03	First President's Foundation Prize in Kazakhstan	Astana, Kazakhstan	Laureate
2016-01-22	National People's Favorite Awards	Astana, Kazakhstan	"Best Pop Artist"
2015-12-28	People of the Year	Astana, Kazakhstan	"Singer of the Year"
2014-12-30	The State Youth Prize Daryn of the Government of the Republic of Kazakhstan	Astana, Kazakhstan	Category "Stage"

Titles and Honors
Date	Event	Location	Award
2026-03-05	International Organization of Turkic Culture	Astana, Kazakhstan	Ambassador of the Turkic World Culture
2025-12-18	Kazakh National Medical University	Almaty, Kazakhstan	Honorary Professor
2025-07-22	Decree of the President of the Republic of Kyrgystan	Cholpon-Ata, Kyrgyzstan	The People’s Artist of the Kyrgyz Republic
2024-12-09	Decree of the President of The Republic of Kazakhstan	Astana, Kazakhstan	Goodwill Ambassador of Kazakhstan
2023-12-03	Karic Brothers Foundation Award	Serbia, Belgrade	Prize in recognition of his contribution to the culture of Kazakhstan
2023-10-24	Decree of the President of the Republic of Kazakhstan	Astana, Kazakhstan	The People's Artist of Kazakhstan
2023-06-22	City University Malaysia	Kuala Lumpur, Malaysia	"Chancellor's Medallion" (For Outstanding Contribution to the Performing Arts, in recognition and contribution to the performing arts and utilisation of his artistic mastery to transcend boundaries)
2022-11-09	The Muslim 500 Magazine	Amman, Jordan	Ranked among "The 500 Most Influential Muslims"
2022-09-15	Seventh Congress of Leaders of World and Traditional Religions	Astana, Kazakhstan	"Commemorative medal awarded by Pope Francis"
2021-12-06	'30 Years, 30 Names' on the Occasion of The 30th Anniversary of Kazakhstan's Independence	Nur-Sultan, Kazakhstan	Cultural Merit Award
2019-12-12	Decree of the President of the Republic of Kazakhstan	Nur-Sultan, Kazakhstan	"Honored Worker of Kazakhstan"(ru) (medal and honorary title for significant contribution to the socioeconomic and cultural development of the country)
2019-12-11	40th session of the Maslikhat (regional parliament) of the Aktobe Region	Aktobe, Kazakhstan	"Honorary Citizen of the Aktobe Region"
2019-09-29	Forbes 30 Under 30 2019 of Forbes Kazakhstan	Kazakhstan	Ranked among "30 Under 30" Most Influential People
2018-12-16	The Silk Road Cohesion Awards	Shanghai, China	"Silk Road Youth Ambassador"
2018-09-29	Forbes 30 Under 30 2018 of Forbes Kazakhstan	Kazakhstan	Ranked among "30 Under 30" Most Influential People (article 185019)
2018-06-01	Meeting with the chairman of the Kazakh Tourism Board Rashid Kuzembaev	Aktobe, Kazakhstan	"Honorary Tourism Ambassador of Kazakhstan"
2018-02-01	Belt and Road International Brand Spring Festival Gala	Beijing, China	"Friendship Ambassador" of China and Kazakhstan
2017-05-07	Chinese Embassy in Kazakhstan	Astana, Kazakhstan	Honorary Certificate of Diplomacy
2017-04-26	25th session of the People's Assembly of Kazakhstan	Astana, Kazakhstan	Blessing by the president of Kazakhstan
2017-02-21	Municipal Government of Chengdu	Chengdu, China	"Honorary Experience China Ambassador"
2016-12-30	State Grand	Astana, Kazakhstan	"Leadership in the Field of Culture 2016"
2016-03-10	Republic Youth Forum	Aktobe, Kazakhstan	Honored by the president of Kazakhstan for his successes
2016-02-02	Assembly of the People of Kazakhstan	Astana, Kazakhstan	Certificate of Honor

== Discography ==
Albums

- iD (2019)
- Dimash Qudaibergen and Igor Krutoy (2021)

== Filmography ==
Documentaries about Qudaibergen
Year	TV channel	English title	Original title	Language
2020	Khabar TV and Kazakh TV	Dimash Show Inspiration	Russian: Dimash Show Вдохновение (Dimash Show Vdokhnoveniye)	Kazakh and Russian
2020		Dimash Show Entourage	Russian: Dimash Show Окружение (Dimash Show Okruzheniye)	Kazakh and Russian
2020	Khabar TV	Dimash Show RISING	Kazakh: Dimash Show САМҒАУ (Dimash Show SAMĞAW)	Kazakh and Russian
2020	Khabar TV and Kazakh TV	Dimash Show	Dimash Show	Kazakh and Russian
2019	Qazaqstan TV	DIMASH	DIMASH	Kazakh and Russian
2017	Khabar TV	Great Dimash	Kazakh: Дүлдүл Димаш (Düldül Dimash)	Kazakh
2017	Hunan TV	Dimash The Singer	Chinese: 迪玛希 歌手 (Dí mǎ xī Gēshǒu)	Mandarin and Kazakh

Acting roles
Year	Production type	TV channel	English title	Original title	Language	Role	Remarks
2022	Extended Music Video, 12 Minutes (Drama)	Qazaq TV	The Story of One Sky	The Story of One Sky	English	Main role a soldier; Secondary role son of the soldier	Featured Qudaibergen's song "The Story of One Sky"
2020	Short Movie (Comedy)	KTO	Krutoy, Krutaya and the Coolest	Russian: Крутой, Крутая и самые крутые (Krutoy, Krutaya i samyye krutyye)	Russian	Supporting role (in 3 roles: a soldier, a singer and as himself)	Consists of remakes of scenes from popular Soviet comedy movies
2019	TV Musical	NTV	1001 Nights, Territory of Love	Russian: 1001 ночь, или Территория любви (1001 noch', ili Territoriya lyubvi)	Russian	Supporting role: a Middle Eastern prince	Featured Qudaibergen's song "Love of Tired Swans". The lyrics of all featured songs were written by the Russian poet Mikail Gutseriev
2018	Short Movie (Drama)	Hunan TV	PhantaCity	PhantaCity	Mandarin and English	Main role: a boxer	Featured Qudaibergen's songs "If I Never Breathe Again" and "When You Believe"
2017	TV show (one episode)	iQiyi	My Boyfriend's A Superstar/Fan Fan Boyfriend	Chinese: 饭饭男友 (Fàn fàn nányǒu)	Mandarin and Kazakh	Main role: a fan's boyfriend	

Solo concert TV productions
Year	TV channel	Title	Concert Location
2020	Inter	Arnau Kyiv	Kyiv, Ukraine
2019	Qazaqstan TV	Arnau Envoy	New York City, United States
2019	Khabar TV and Kazakh TV	Saint Petersburg Solo Concert	Saint Petersburg, Russia
2019	Qazaqstan TV	Arnau	Nur-Sultan, Kazakhstan
2019	Qazaqstan TV and NTV	D-Dynasty Moscow	Moscow, Russia
2018	iQiyi	D-Dynasty Fuzhou	Fuzhou, China
2017	iQiyi	D-Dynasty Changsha	Changsha, China
2017	Channel 31	Bastau (Kazakh: Бастау)	Astana, Kazakhstan

== Solo concerts and international tours ==
=== Solo concerts ===
Solo concerts
Date	Title	Location	Venue	Attendance	Remark
2019-11-29	Saint Petersburg Solo Concert	Saint Petersburg, Russia	Ice Palace	13.000	Sold out
2019-10-18	WOW Arena Solo Concert	Sochi, Russia	WOW Arena	3,000	Sold out
2018-11-19	London Solo Concert (as part of the Kazakhstan Day of Culture in UK)	London, UK	Indigo at The O2	2,800	Sold out; audience members from 45 countries; all proceeds went to support young talents from Kazakhstan and sponsor youth participation in international contests
2017-06-27	Bastau	Astana, Kazakhstan	Astana Arena	30,000	Sold out

=== Tours ===
Dimensions Tour
Date	Location	Venue	Attendance	Remark
2026-12-12	Jakarta, Indonesia	Sentul International Convention Center		
2026-12-01	Lima, Peru	Costa 21		
2026-11-24	Santiago, Chile	Movistar Arena		
2026-11-22	Bogotá, Colombia	Movistar Arena		
2026-11-20	Mexico City, Mexico	Palacio de los Deportes		
2026-11-19	Mexico City, Mexico	Palacio de los Deportes		
2026-11-17	Guadalajara, Mexico	Auditorio Telmex		
2026-11-14	Monterrey, Mexico	Auditorio Citibanamex		
2026-11-11	Mérida, Mexico	Foro GNP Seguros		
2026-10-30	Madrid, Spain	Palacio Vistalegre		
2026-10-24	Düsseldorf, Germany	PSD Bank Dome		
2026-10-18	Kraków, Poland	Tauron Arena		

Stranger Tour
Date	Location	Venue	Attendance	Remark
2025-12-12	Riga, Latvia	Xiaomi Arena		
2025-11-14	Berlin, Germany	Max-Schmeling-Halle		
2025-11-12	London, England	Ovo Arena Wembley		
2025-11-08	Barcelona, Spain	Olimpic Arena Badalona		
2025-10-10	Mexico City	Palacio De Los Deportes		
2025-10-08	Mexico City	Auditorio Nacional		
2025-10-05	New York City, USA	Madison Square Garden		
2024-11-24	Düsseldorf, Germany	PSD Bank Dome		
2024-11-22	Prague, Czech Republic	Sportovní hala Fortuna		
2024-09-14	Astana, Kazakhstan	Astana Arena		Reported as over 10,000 in attendance
2024-09-13	Astana, Kazakhstan	Astana Arena		Reported as over 10,000 in attendance
2024-05-24	Istanbul, Turkey	Beşiktaş Stadium		
2024-05-04	Budapest, Hungary	László Papp Budapest Sports Arena		Reported as a sold-out concert, the fans came from 77 countries
2023-12-23	Hong Kong, China	Hall 5BC, Hong Kong Convention and Exhibition Centre		
2023-06-24	Kuala Lumpur, Malaysia	Axiata Arena		
2023-05-06	Aksu, Antalya, Turkey	Expo 2016 congress center		Initially planned in Akdeniz University Stadium. Venue choice changed due to thunderstorm.
2023-04-29	Yerevan, Armenia	Karen Demirchyan Complex		
2022-09-23	Almaty, Kazakhstan	Almaty Arena	30,000+	Sold out; audience members reported to be nearly 35,000 in attendance from 68 countries

Arnau Tour
Date	Location	Venue	Attendance	Remark
2022-04-16	Prague, Czech Republic	Tipsport Arena		
2022-04-09	Düsseldorf, Germany	ISS-Dome		
2022-03-25	Dubai, UAE	Coca-Cola Arena		Audience attended from 69 countries
2020-03-11	Kyiv, Ukraine	Sports Palace	7,000	Sold out; audience members from 20 countries
2020-03-09	Moscow, Russia	Megasport Sport Palace	14,000	Sold out
2020-03-07	Riga, Latvia	Arena Riga	14,500	Sold out; audience members from more than 30 countries
2020-02-23	Yekaterinburg, Russia	Yekaterinburg EXPO	5,000	Sold out
2020-02-20	Kazan, Russia	TatNeft Arena	10,500	Sold out
2020-02-16	Krasnodar, Russia	Basket Hall	7,500	Sold out
2019-12-10	New York City, United States	Barclays Center	19,000	Sold out
2019-06-29	Nur-Sultan, Kazakhstan	Astana Arena	40,000	Sold out; audience members from 64 countries; won Ticketon Award for "Best Pop Concert of the Year"; funds from the concert were donated to the victims of the Arys explosions

D-Dynasty Tour
Date	Location	Venue	Attendance	Remark
2019-03-23	Moscow, Russia	Kremlin Palace	6,000	Sold out; second show added
2019-03-22	Moscow, Russia	Kremlin Palace	6,000	Sold out
2018-05-19	Shenzhen, China	Universiade Sports Centre	19,500	Sold out
2018-01-05	Fuzhou, China	Haixia Olympic Center Indoor Arena	13,000	Sold out
2017-12-16	Changsha, China	Hunan International Center	10,000	Sold out

Unforgettable Day Tour
Date	Number of shows	Locations	Remark
April – December 2016	27	solo concerts in 25 cities of Kazakhstan and in two cities of Russia (Kazan, Ufa)	First solo tour; included 25 concerts in 25 regions of Kazakhstan in honor of the 25th anniversary of the country's Independence

== Fandom ==
Dimash calls his fans "Dears".

In November 2021, it was announced that a museum dedicated to Dimash Qudaibergen will be established in the singer's home city, Aktobe, Kazakhstan.

== Humanitarianism ==
In 2015, Dimash Qudaibergen gave a charitable concert, named "From Heart to Heart", in Atyrau, Kazakhstan, to provide essential medical treatment for a five-year-old girl. He was joined by the Kazakh pop singer Dosymzhan Tanatarov for the event.

Dimash gave benefit performances at the Grand Charity Ball 2015, in the Kazakhstan cities of Shymkent, Kyzylorda and Uralsk. The events were organized by the Alpamys Sharimov Foundation, and the funds were donated to children with hearing and speech impairment.

In early 2016, he joined the Kazakh "Do Good" campaign that provides help for people with disabilities, illnesses and in financial need.

In 2016, he also gave a benefit performance at the "100 Grandmas and Grandpas" Charity Evening of the "Zaman Are We" Project in Astana, Kazakhstan. The elderly of the regional retirement homes were invited as honorary guests and the proceeds of the event were used for social, economic and medical help for elderly residents. Qudaibergen donated all profits of his 2016 "Unforgettable Day" concert, held in his home town Aktobe, to a regional charity organization. With the funds from the concert, seven families in need were supplied with water, utilities, medical care and clothing. A wheelchair accessible ramp was also set up for a wheelchair-using resident.

He gave a benefit performance at the Grand Charity Ball 2016, in Uralsk, Kazakhstan. The teenage students of the local boarding school for visually impaired students were invited as honorary guests of the Ball. Several of these students performed a song on stage with him, and Qudaibergen also danced, in the Waltz part of the event, with the visually-impaired invited guests. The Grand Charity Ball was organized by the Alpamys Sharimov Foundation, and the funds were donated to children with visual impairments, to this boarding school and to the regional orphanage.

At the Top Chinese Music Awards 2017, within the "Love Recycling" Campaign, he donated the suit from his first performance at Hunan Television's Singer 2017 competition. The suit was auctioned by the Jingdong Platform and all the proceeds were donated to the Care of Children Foundation for children with blood lead poisoning.

Dimash gave charitable performances at the Global Gift Galas 2017 in Paris and Cannes. He was invited by Eva Longoria, Honorary Chair of the Global Gift Foundation. The Foundation provides social and economic help to children, families and women in situations of need.

Dimash hosted a live broadcast for the Live Connection Challenge, a live stream charity campaign launched by Hongdou Live and Weibo Public Welfare. The campaign income was donated to the Audiology Development Foundation of China whose goal is to provide hearing and language rehabilitation for people with hearing impairment.

Dimash donated an autographed dombra to an auction of the Smile Angel Foundation, a Chinese charity which aims to help children born with cleft lips and palates.

A charitable performance was given at the Grand Charity Ball 2017 in Uralsk hosted by the Alpamys Sharimov Foundation. It was held under the motto "Love for All" and the profits were donated to seriously ill people in Kazakhstan.

Dimash gave a charity performance at the "Chinese National Wind Charity Concert", in Beijing, that was held under the motto "Pray for the Year". It was hosted by the China Children's Fund and the China Youth Foundation. The funds from the concert were used to enable music classes in rural Chinese primary schools that could not afford them.

He gave another charitable performance at the Villa International "Beauty Touching" charity event that was jointly hosted by the China Children and Teenagers Fund and "Bridge Culture" (supported by the China Intangible Cultural Heritage Protection Association).

Dimash became goodwill ambassador of the "Listen Project" by the Audiology Development Foundation of China Trust Fund that provides hearing aid devices and education to hearing-impaired children.

A charitable performance was given at the Opening Gala of the Kazakh Snow Leopard Foundation whose goal is to save the endangered population and to preserve their natural habitat by creating protected areas.

On 19 November 2018, Dimash gave a solo concert in London, UK, during the Great Britain's Days of Kazakhstan Culture. All proceeds went to promote young talent from Kazakhstan and sponsor youth participation in prestigious international contests.

Within the frame of the Shanghai Pet Adoption Day 2019, he became a supporter of the "Love is Home" initiative that aims to improve awareness and to increase adoptions of stray animals.

On his 25th birthday he visited a nursing home for the elderly and the physically impaired in his hometown Aktobe. As it is customary for him on his birthday since his school days, he brought gifts and spent time with the residents. He also performed for them a cappella.

A few days before his "Arnau" Concert of 29 June 2019, in Astana, Kazakhstan, there were explosions near the Kazakhstan city of Arys that caused casualties. Dimash decided to donate funds from his concert to the victims.

When he was in the Russian city of Kazan for his performance at the WorldSkills 2019, he visited the local children's hospice to see a seriously ill fan who couldn't attend Dimash's concert due to chemotherapy.

When in Kyiv, Ukraine, for his Arnau Tour, he donated clothes and other belongings to an auction for the Ukrainian Okhmatdyt Center for Pediatric Toxicology that aims to save the lives of children with acute poisoning, and also enables hemodialysis for children with low weight, heart problems and unstable blood pressure.

During the COVID-19 pandemic in Kazakhstan, Dimash provided 102 needy families in Nur-Sultan and Aktobe with five tons of food.

On 7 October 2020, Dimash announced his partnership with Michael Kors in support of the charity campaign Food Is Love with the United Nations World Food Programme (WFP). Dimash and his fans actively participated in the PR campaign during October and November, to draw people's attention to the problem of world hunger through support for the WFP.

In December 2020, a director of Project C.U.R.E., Melisa Espositi, announced Dimash as their new Global Ambassador and organized a ticket giveaway for the Dimash Digital Show charity concert.

On 5 January 2021, it was announced that for the first time in the history of relations between the United States and Kazakhstan, a Kazakh artist, Dimash Qudaibergen was to take part in the annual Sister Cities International (SCI) event, opening the week of celebrations for the inauguration of the newly elected President of the United States, and included award presentations for the 2020 Eisenhower Peace Prize and the Distinguished Leadership Award.

On 16 January 2021, with encore performances until 23 January, as well as on 31 January, the Dimash Digital Show charity concert streamed on Tixr with funds being donated to Project C.U.R.E. Dimash had been earlier named as their Global Ambassador.

On 10 March 2021, Dimash took part in Project C.U.R.E.'s International Women's Day with his video of "We Are One". At that time, the president of Project C.U.R.E., Dr Douglas Jackson, confirmed that partial proceeds of the Dimash Digital Show had been donated to healthcare in Kazakhstan.

On 14 September 2022, Dimash met with Pope Francis and received a commemorative medal from him about the pontiff's visit to the VII Congress of Leaders of World and Traditional Religions in Astana.

=== 2022 Kazakh protests ===
During the 2022 Kazakh protests, Dimash made an Instagram post on 4 January calling for a peaceful solution to the issues raised by the protesters as well as internal stability and calmness. Dimash was one of the very few Kazakh celebrities to comment on the protests. On 5 January, Dimash's account went offline without any explanation. He had over three million followers and was one of the most followed Kazakh accounts on the platform.
