= Ermek Serkebayev =

Soviet and Kazakh singer, actor, and educator

- Ермек Серкебаев
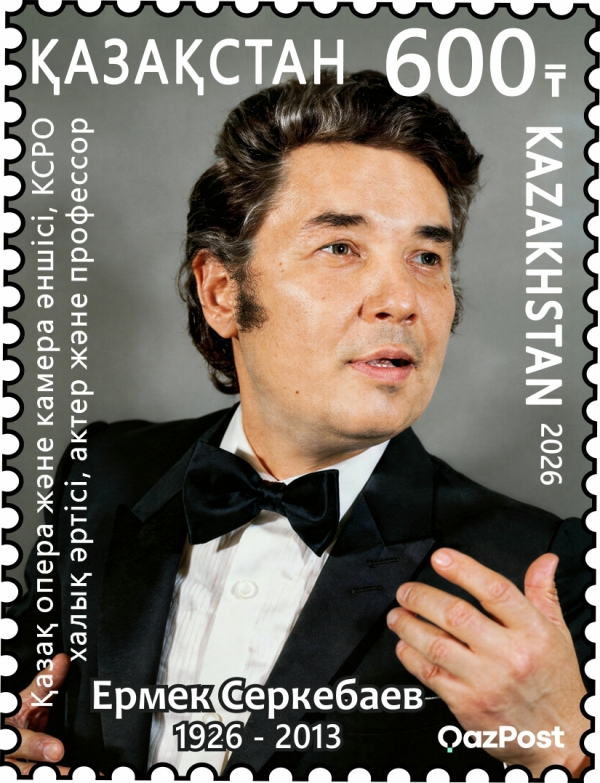
- Serkebayev on a 2026 stamp of Kazakhstan
- Born: 4 July 1926; Petropavl, Kazakh ASSR, Soviet Union
- Died: 16 November 2013 (aged 87); Almaty, Kazakhstan
- Education: Tchaikovsky Almaty Music College; Kurmangazy Kazakh National Conservatoire
- Occupations: Singer; actor; music pedagogue
- Years active: 1947–2006

Ermek Bekmūhamedūly Serkebaev (Note: Often transliterated as Yermke Bekmukhamedovich Serkebayev through a Russified Romanization of Ермек Бекмухамедович Серкебаев.) (Kazakh: Ермек Бекмұхамедұлы Серкебаев; 4 July 1926 – 16 November 2013) was a Soviet and Kazakh chamber and opera baritone singer, actor, and educator. He received many awards including People's Artist of the USSR in 1959 and Hero of Socialist Labour in 1986.

== Biography ==
Serkebayev was born in Petropavl on 4 July 1926. His father Bekmukhamed Khusainovich Serkebayev was a Kazakh language teacher, editor of Kedei Sozi newspaper; he also wrote articles and scripts for Kazakh plays. Ermek's mother Zylikha Sabirovna Serkebayeva was a primary school teacher, she had a sharp ear for music and a beautiful voice. Ermek was fond of music from an early age, and balalaika was the first instrument he learned to play.

When the family moved from Kokchetav to Alma-Ata in 1937, parents sent Ermek to Tchaikovsky Alma-Ata Music Academy to study violin. In 1951 he graduated from the singing course led by Kurganov, himself an alumnus of the Italian vocal school, at the Kurmangazy Kazakh Conservatoire. Ermek Serkebayev worked as an anchorman at Kazakhstan Radio and a soloist at the Abay Kazakh Opera and Ballet Theater.

Ermek Serkebayev also performed as a chamber and stage singer, singing Kazakh folk songs, compositions by Russian and foreign composers. He toured a lot and performed in over 50 countries, including Belgium, China, Cuba, Finland, France, India, Indonesia, Pakistan, Romania, Sweden and Switzerland. He repeatedly served on and chaired juries of renowned music competitions, including Tchaikovsky International Competition and Glinka International Music Competition.

In 1973 he started teaching singing at the Kazakh Conservatoire and became a professor in 1982.

Ermek Serkebayev had been the chairman of the Kazakhstani Republican Union of Musicians and a member of the executive committee of the International Union of Music Professionals (Moscow) since 1988. In his autumn years, he combined these roles with that of advisor to the President of Abay Kazakh State Academic Opera and Ballet Theater (where he also continued to perform as a singer).

Ermek Serkebayev died in Almaty on 16 November 2013.

=== Family ===
Serkebayev was married four times; his son of the first marriage, Baigali Serkebayev, became a well-known musician and leader of A-Studio, a popular band.

Alfia Baizhanova was Ermek's fourth and last wife.

Ermek's brother Murat and niece Jamilya Serkebayeva are other worthy successors of the Serkebayev musical dynasty.

== Awards and honors ==
- People's Artist of the Kazakh SSR (1958)
- People's Artist of the USSR (1959)
- USSR State Prize (1977)
- Hero of Socialist Labour (1986)
- Two Orders of Lenin (one in 1986)
- Order of the October Revolution (1984)
- Order of Fatherland (1997)
- Order of the Red Banner of Labour

== Career ==
=== Roles ===
- Birzhan and Sara by Mukan Tulebayev – Birzhan
- Amangeldy by Mukan Tulebayev and Yevgeny Brusilovsky – Amangeldy
- Abai by Akhmet Zhubanov and Latif Khamidi – Abay
- Eugene Onegin by Pyotr Ilyich Tchaikovsky – Onegin
- The Queen of Spades by Tchaikovsky – Yeletsky
- Iolanta by Tchaikovsky – Robert
- Mazeppa by Tchaikovsky – Mazepa
- The Barber of Seville by Gioachino Rossini – Figaro
- The Taming of the Shrew by Vissarion Shebalin – Petruchio
- Don Giovanni by Wolfgang Amadeus Mozart – Don Giovanni
- Halka by Stanisław Moniuszko – Janusz
- Carmen by Georges Bizet – Escamillo
- Er-Targyn by Yevgeny Brusilovsky – Kapan, Er-Targyn
- Dudarai by Yevgeny Brusilovsky – Artyom
- Zhalbyr by Yevgeny Brusilovsky – Sugur
- Aisulu by Sydyk Mukhamedzhanov – Serke
- The Young Guard by Yuliy Meitus – Oleg Koshevoy
- The Ulyanov Brothers by Yuliy Meitus – Vladimir Ulyanov
- Tulegen Tokhtarov by Akhmet Zhubanov and Latif Khamidi – Tulegen
- Zhambyl by Latif Khamidi – Zhambyl
- Alpamys by Erkegali Rakhmadiyev – Alpamys
- La traviata by Giuseppe Verdi – Alfredo Germont
- Nazugum by Quddus Khojamyarov – Gul’mat
- Roméo et Juliette by Charles Gounod – Mercutio
- Faust by Charles Gounod – Valentin
- Prince Igor by Alexander Borodin – Prince Igor
- Enlik-Kebek by Gaziza Zhubanova – Esen
- Twenty Eight by Gaziza Zhubanova
- Song of Virgin Soil by Erkegali Rakhmadiyev

=== Filmography ===
Year	Title	Original title	Role
1957	Our Kind Doctor	Наш милый доктор	Taken
1961	The Song's Calling	Песня зовёт	Dosay Nurlanov
1968	Angel Wearing Tubeteyka	Ангел в тюбетейке	Chingiz
1976	Meeting at Medeu	Встречи на Медео	Jayran's father, musician

== Legacy ==
- A memorial plaque was installed in the Almaty house where Ermek Serkebayev lived (at the intersection of Jeltoqsan and Bogenbay Batyr streets) in 2014;
- In June 2022 Chamber Hall of the Kazakh National Opera and Ballet Theater was named after People's Artist of the USSR Ermek Serkebayev;
- A 30-meter tall mural of Ermek Serkebayev (designed by Aydar Munaitbasov) was painted in Astana in July 2022.
