= Dimash Qudaibergen discography =

This is the discography of Kazakh singer Dimash Qudaibergen.

== Albums ==
Albums
Year	Title	Songs
2021	Dimash Kudaibergen and Igor Krutoy	Track listing: 1. Love of Tired Swans (Russian: Любовь уставших лебедей, Lubov ustavshikh lebedei); 2. Olympico (Italian: Ogni Pietra); 3. Ave Maria; 4. Stranger; 5. Love is Like a Dream (Russian: Любовь, похожая на сон, Liubov, pokhozhaia na son); 6. Mademoiselle Hyde; 7. Know (Russian: Знай, Znay); 8. Where Love Lives (Russian:Там где живет любовь, Tam, gde zhivet liubov); 9. I Miss You (Russian: Я скучаю по тебе, Ia skuchaiu po tebe); 10. Passione; 11. Ulisse; 12. Your Love; 13. Ti Amo Cosi
2019	iD	Track listing: 1. War and Peace (Chinese: 戰爭與和平, Zhànzhēng Yǔ Hépíng); 2. The Crown (Chinese: 荊棘王冠, Jīngjí Wángguàn); 3. Just Let It Be (Chinese: 就这样吧, Jiù zhèyàng ba); 4. Moonlight Mama (Chinese: 月亮媽媽, Yuèliàng Māmā); 5. Give me Love (Kazakh: Махаббат бер маған, Makhabbat Ber Magan); 6. Screaming; 7. Lay Down; 8. Give Me Your Love; 9. Sagyndym Seni (Kazakh: Сагындым сени, I Miss You); 10. If I Never Breathe Again; 11. Screaming (Remix); 12. bonus track on physical album: Only You (Chinese: 有你, Yǒu nǐ); 13. bonus track on physical album: Restart My Love (Chinese: 重啟愛情, Chóngqǐ àiqíng); 14. bonus track on physical album: Ocean Over Time (Chinese: 时光·沧海, Shíguāng·cānghǎi); 15. bonus track on physical album: Couldn't Leave

Extended play
Year	Title	Language	Songs
2016	Dimash Kudaibergen	Kazakh	Track listing: 1. Yerkeleteyin (Kazakh: Еркелетейін; Cherishing You); 2. Körkemim (Kazakh: Көркемім; My Belle); 3. Daididau (Kazakh: Дайдидау); 4. Tugan Zher (Kazakh: Туған жер; My Homeland)

== Singles ==
Singles
Year	English title	Original title	Romanization	Songwriter	Remarks
2025	Fire			Music : D. Qudaibergen. Lyrics : Reese Morgan	Presented on 13 September 2024. Premiered on Grammys YouTube Channel on 4 Dec 2025
2025	Living For The Game				Presented on 10 October 2025 at Madison Square Garden concert
2025	Soar	Самғау	Samğau	Music : D. Qudaibergen. Lyrics : Zharaskan Nurbay (Жарасқан Нұрбай)	Presented on 10 October 2025 at Madison Square Garden concert
2025	In The Mountains	Kazakh:Тау ішінде	Tau işinde	Music and lyrics : Saken Seifullin	Released on 6 May 2025
2025	Love's Not Over Yet	Love's Not Over Yet		Music and lyrics: Devon Graves, Dominique Bourse, Flavien Compagnon, Walter Afanasieff	Released on 7 March 2025.
2024	This Love	Chinese: 这份爱	Zhè fèn ài	Music: Nathan Wang (王宗贤). Lyrics: Weilim (林威)	Released on 5 July 2024.
2024	Smoke	Smoke		Music: D. Qudaibergen. Lyrics: Dmytro Gordon, Candice Kelly	Released on 26 April 2024.
2024	When I've Got You	When I've Got You		Music: D. Qudaibergen. Lyrics: Dmytro Gordon, Candice Kelly	Released on 26 February 2024.
2023	Weekend	Weekend		Music and lyrics: Burak Yeter, D. Qudaibergen	Released on 25 August 2023.
2023	Life	Kazakh: Omir		Music and lyrics: D. Qudaibergen	Mood Video released 24 May 2023
2023	Together	Together		Music: Abilmansur Qudaibergen. Lyrics: Dmitriy Goubnitsky	Released on 22 March 2023.
2023	The Love In You	El Amor En Ti		Composed by: D. Qudaibergen	Released on 05 Jan 2023.
2022	The Story of One Sky	The Story of One Sky		Music : D. Qudaibergen. Lyrics: Lilia Vinogradova	Released on 24 Sep 2022.
2022	Flame	Kazakh: Пламя	Zhalyn	Music: D. Qudaibergen, Y.Gabbasov. Lyrics: N.Askhtuly	Mood Video released 26 August 2022
2022	Okay	Russian: О'кей	OK	Composed by Igor Krutoy.	Released on 24 May 2022.
2021	Life Is Short	Kazakh: Ómir Óter		Composed by Renat Gaissin. Lyrics by Talant Aryngali.	Presented on 16 January 2021 at the Dimash Digital Show Online Concert via the streaming media platform Tixr.com
2021	Ave Maria			Composed by Igor Krutoy.	Presented at New Wave 2021 on 25 August 2021 in Sochi, Russia.
2021	Fly Away			Composed by Yedilzhan Gabbasov. Lyrics by Jordan Arakelyan.	Presented at New Wave 2021 on 24 August 2021 in Sochi, Russia.
2021	Stranger			Composed by Igor Krutoy, lyrics by Sharon Vaughn, traditional instrument Kobyz by Olzhas Qurmanbek, arrangement by Dimitris Kontopoulos and Yerlan Bekchurin..	Presented at New Wave 2021 on 19 August 2021 in Sochi, Russia.
2021	Be With Me			Composed by Dimash Kudaibergen. Lyrics by Jordan Arakelyan and Dauren Shamuratov.	Presented on 16 January 2021 at the Dimash Digital Show Online Concert via the streaming media platform Tixr.com
2021	Golden			Lyrics: Anderz Wrethov, Markus Videsäter, David Strääf. Composed: Anderz Wrethov, Markus Videsäter, David Strääf.	Presented at the Arnau Live Concert on 29 June 2019 in Astana, Kazakhstan
2020	I Miss You	Russian: Я скучаю по тебе	Ya skuchayu po tebe	Composed by Igor Krutoy, Lyrics by Igor Nikolaev	Presented on 2 December 2020 at Blue Light New Year Show on Russia-1.
2020	Qairan Elim ("Oh, my holy land!")	Kazakh: Қайран елім	Qairan Elim	Composed by Renat Gaissin. Lyrics by Daniyar Aldabergen and Oral Baisengir	A dedicated message and a call to all people for good, positive thoughts during the current difficult times.
2020	We are One			Composed by Dǒng Nán (Chinese: 董楠), Táng Yì (Chinese: 唐轶). Lyrics by Gāo Shàng (Chinese: 高尚), Shāng Yáng (Chinese: 商洋).	Dedicated to frontline workers and those in isolation during COVID-19 pandemic; received gold certificate on QQ Music
2020	Across Endless Dimensions			Composed by Piergiuseppe Zaia, Lyrics by Antonella Maggio	Theme song for movie Creators: The Past
2020	(no official English title)	Chinese: 嗨皮一下	Hāi pí yíxià	Composed by Nathan Wang, Lyrics by Lǐ Ruòxī (Chinese: 李若溪), Lín Wēi (Chinese: 林威)	Soundtrack for movie Vanguard
2019	Only You	Chinese: 有你	Yǒu nǐ	Composed by Lee Sang-hoon (Hangul: 이상훈 ), Lyrics by S-tin	Theme song for TV series Perfect Partner; Reached No. 1 on the Chinese QQ Music Charts
2019	Couldn't Leave			Composed and lyrics by Chén Xuěrán (Chinese: 陳雪燃)	Soundtrack for TV series Go Go Squid!
2019	Olimpico (also known as "Ogni Pietra")	Italian: Olimpico/Ogni Pietra		Composed by Igor Krutoy, Lyrics by Lilia Vinogradova	First Single in Italian; Presented on 21 June 2019 at the Opening Ceremony of the 2019 European Games; Won a Pesnya Goda 2019 Award
2019	Lay Down			Composed by K.Chozen, Appu Krishnan, Jason Jones, Lyrics by Christian Jansson, Otto Palmborg	Reached No. 1 on the Chinese QQ Music Charts
2019	Know	Russian: Знай	Znay	Composed by Igor Krutoy, Lyrics by Mikhail Gutseriev	Presented at D-Dynasty Live Concert on 22 March 2019 in Moscow, Russia; Won a Pesnya Goda 2019 Award
2019	War And Peace	Chinese: 戰爭與和平	Zhànzhēng yǔ hépíng	Composed by Dimash Kudaibergen, Lyrics by Yáo Qiān (Chinese: 姚谦) and Dimash Kudaibergen	Presented at D-Dynasty Live Concert on 16 December 2017 in Changsha, China
2019	My Swan	Kazakh: Аққуым	Akkuym	Composed by Aimurat Mazhikbayev, Lyrics by Oral Baisengir	New solo version
2018	Love of Tired Swans	Russian: Любовь уставших лебедей	Lyubov' ustavshikh lebedey	Composed by Igor Krutoy, Lyrics by Mikhail Gutseriev	First Single in Russian; Won a Pesnya Goda 2018 Award
2018	Meaning of Eternity	Chinese: 永恒的意义	Yǒnghéng de yìyì	Composed by Sà Dǐng Dǐng (Chinese: 萨顶顶), Lyrics by Yù Jiāng (Chinese: 喻江)	Part of the promotional EP 玫瑰物语 (Méiguī wùyǔ, Tale of the Rose) for the musical 我的小伙伴 (Wǒ de xiǎo huǒbàn, Three Buddies)
2018	Never Land	Chinese: 熱鬧星球	Rènào xīngqiú	Composed by Lukpan Zholdasov. Lyrics by Lǚ Yìqiū (Chinese: 吕易秋).	Studio version of "Lively Planet"
2018	Screaming			Composed by Mughal. Lyrics by A.J Runyon	First Single in English
2018	Restart My Love	Chinese: 重啟愛情	Chóngqǐ àiqíng	Composed by Jeon Da-woon (Hangul: 전다운), Lyrics by Wú Xiǎosū (Chinese: 吴晓苏)	Soundtrack for TV series My Idol
2017	Moonlight Mother	Chinese: 月光妈妈	Yuèguāng māmā	Composed by Lukpan Zholdasov. Lyrics by Yáo Qiān (Chinese: 姚谦)	Presented at D-Dynasty Live Concert on 16 of December 2017 in Chansha, China
2017	If I Never Breathe Again			Composed and lyrics by Justin Gray & Mark Masri	
2017	The Crown	Chinese: 荊棘王冠	Jīngjí wángguàn	Composed by Lukpan Zholdasov, Chinese lyrics by Táng Tián (Chinese: 唐恬)	Chinese version of "Kim Eken"; theme song for game Xiaomi Super GOD MOBA; Reached No. 1 on the Chinese QQ Music Charts
2017	Ocean Over The Time	Chinese: 时光·沧海	Shíguāng·cānghǎi	Composed by Thomas Parisch, Lyrics by Gù Tíng Tíng (Chinese: 顾婷婷)	Theme song for game Moonlight Blade Online; Won Hollywood Music in Media Award for "Best Original Song in a Video Game"
2017	Go Go Power Rangers				Soundtrack for movie Power Rangers
2017	Eternal Memories	Chinese: 拿不走的记忆	Ná bù zǒu de jìyì	Composed by Sòng Bǐng Yáng (Chinese: 宋秉洋). Lyrics by Daryl Yao (Chinese: 姚若龙; Yáo Ruò Lóng)	First Single in Mandarin; Theme song for movie Battle of Memories; Reached No. 1 on the Chinese QQ Music Charts
2017	Give Me Love	Kazakh: Махаббат бер маған	Maxabbat ber mağan	Composed by Аigül Bajanova, Lyrics by Munaydar Balmolda	Presented at Singer 2017 Gala on 22 April 2017 in Changsha, China
2015	My Swan	Kazakh: Аққуым	Akkuym	Composed by Aimurat Mazhikbayev, Lyrics by Oral Baisengir	Duet with Maira Mukhamedkyzy
2015	Unforgettable Day	Kazakh: Ұмытылмас күн	Umıtılmas kün	Composed by Dimash Kudaibergen, Lyrics by Oral Baissengir	
2012	My Beauty	Kazakh: Көркемім	Körkemim	Composed by Dimash Kudaibergen, Lyrics by Dimash Kudaibergen's father Kanat Aitbayev	

== Songs Written By Dimash Qudaibergen ==
Songs Written By Dimash Qudaibergen
Year	English title	Original title	Lyrics by	Video link
2026	Samal	Samal	Oral Baisengir	Live performance on YouTube
2024	When I've Got You		Dmytro Gordon, Candice Kelly	Official music video
2023	Life	Kazakh: Өмір (Omir)	D. Qudaibergen	Official mood video
2022	The Love In You	Spanish: El Amor En Ti	Regina Maria Ovando Gomez Morin, Hildegard Wohler Granados	Live performance
2022	The Story of One Sky		Lilia Vinogradova	Music video
2022	Flame	Kazakh: Жалын (Zhalyn)	Music: D. Qudaibergen, Y.Gabbasov. Lyrics: N.Askhtuly	Official mood video
2021	Be With Me		Jordan Arakelyan and Dauren Shamuratov	Official music video
2019	Papa - Mama	Kazakh: Әкешім-анашым (Akeshim - Anashym)	Askar Duisenbi and Dimash Kudaibergen	Live performance
2019	Stand Up		Jordan Arakelyan	Live performance
2019	Give Me Your Love		Jordan Arakelyan	Live performance
2018	Regret	Kazakh: Өкініш (Ökiniş)	Zhomart Oraz	
2017	War And Peace	Chinese: 戰爭與和平 (Zhànzhēng yǔ hépíng)	Yao Qian and Dimash Kudaibergen	Live performance
2017	Last Word	Kazakh: Сөз соңы (Söz soñı)	Oraz Kynbayev	Live performance
2017	Sweet Illusion	Kazakh: Тәтті елес (Tätti eles)	Sayat Abenov	Live performance
2017	Salem (Hello)	Kazakh: Сәлем (Sälem)	Kanat Aitbayev	Live performance
2015	Unforgettable Day	Kazakh: Ұмытылмас күн (Umıtılmas kün)	Oral Baissengir	Live performance
2012	My Beauty	Kazakh: Көркемім (Körkemim)	Kanat Aitbayev	Official music video
