= Lev Dengov =

Russian politician and businessman

- Born: 6 June 1984 (age 41); Minsk, Byelorussian SSR, Soviet Union (now Belarus)
- Education: Russian State Academy of Intellectual Property
- Occupations: entrepreneur, businessman
- Spouse: Keti Topuria

Lev Leonidovich Dengov (Russian: Лев Леонидович Деньгов, Belarusian: Леў Леанідавіч Дзяньгоў, romanized: Lieǔ Lieanidavič Dzianhoǔ; born 6 June 1984) is a Russian-Belarusian entrepreneur and businessman. Chairman of the Board of the Russian-Libyan Trade House.

At the instruction of the leadership of the Russian Federation, he participated and was engaged in liberation of the Russian and Belarusian citizens in Libya. He established and developed Russian-Libyan relations in the socio-political and economic spheres. At the time of the revolution and the civil war in Libya, he repeatedly visited the country to maintain contact with the new authorities.

== Biography ==
=== Early years, education ===
He was born in Minsk, then in the Byelorussian SSR of the Soviet Union. He spent his childhood in the village Kraisk, where he studied at the village school till 1999. His father was engaged in entrepreneurial activities, his mother worked as a drawing teacher at school. He graduated from secondary school in a gymnasium with focus on German No. 73 of the city of Minsk. He graduated from RSAIP with the specialty – “Law”. He studied in Johannes Gutenberg University Mainz with the specialty of an economist.

=== Business ===
In 2008–2011 he was a founder of the Libyan-Belarusian joint venture "Almamar-Almetali", which was engaged in construction and design.

In 2011–2015 he was a founder of the Company LTD "BUROMTECH", which supplied construction and covered all the phases of realization of investment-construction projects: design, construction, operation of facilities.

Since 2017 he was the chairman of the Board of the Russian-Libyan Trade House.

=== Public activities ===
In March 2015, on the initiative of Deputy Foreign Minister of the Russian Federation, Special Representative of the President of the Russian Federation for the Middle East M. L. Bogdanov and Deputy of the State Duma of the Federal Assembly of the Russian Federation A. S. Delimkhanov, a Contact Group was established Federal Assembly of the Russian Federation. Its purpose was communication with socio-political groups on the territory of Libya, analysis of the situation in the country, as well as solutions to the Libyan crisis. Lev Dengov was appointed as Head of the Contact Group.

A prerequisite for creation of the Contact was the appeal of the leader of the Libyan National Army Khalifa Haftar with the Russian authorities. The duty of Lev Dengov was to establish a dialogue between the representatives of all parties to the conflict in Libya.

One of the most significant directions of the activities of the group was liberation of Russian and Belarusian citizens, detained in Libya. In 2015, the first visit of the Libyan Group of Khalifa Haftar to Grozny was organized. In October 2016, at the instruction of the Russian Foreign Minister, Dengov was sent to Tripoli as a special envoy of the Government of the Russian Federation for the first official negotiations with the representatives of the Government of the National Accord that came to power to establish first contacts between the Russian Federation and Libya, as well as to free the remaining citizens. Starting from 3 October, Dengov conducted negotiations with the Chairman of the Presidential Council of Libya, Fayez Sarraj, the Chairman of the Supreme State Council, Abdurahman Sewehli, the First Deputy Prime Minister Musa al-Koni, the Head of the Investigative Committee under the Prosecutor-General's Office, As- Sadiq As-Sur, and members of the government. As a result of negotiations, in the same month it was possible to return the remaining citizens detained on the tanker “Mechanic Chebotarev”, as well as to meet with Russian sailors from the tanker “Temeteron”.

In December 2016, the interparliamentary relations were renewed with the cooperation of the Contact Group. A meeting was held between Agila Saleh, speaker of the elected and sitting in Tobruk-based Parliament – House of Representatives of Libya, and with the Ministry of Foreign Affairs of Russian Federation, S.V. Lavrov, Speaker of the State Duma of the Russian Federation V.V. Volodin, Chairman of the Committee on Foreign Affairs L.V. Slutsky, and also Deputy A.S. Delimkhanov. In September 2017, Dengov, in charge of the Contact Group, arranged a visit of the Vice-Prime-Minister of Government of National Accord, Ahmed Maiteeq to Russia. His visit began with a trip to Grozny and continued in Moscow. Among the issues discussed, the topic of the release of the remaining captured Russian sailors was included. Based on the results of the meetings, an agreement was reached on organizing a working visit of representatives of the Government of the National Consent and continuing the course on development of Russian-Libyan relations. As part of the visit, Ahmed Maiteeq held a press conference on the site of the Valdai Discussion Club. On 14 September 2017, a meeting was held with Brigadier General of the Libyan Army Ahmed Al-Mismari in Moscow; during the meeting, Russia's position on the need to maintain contacts with all parties to the conflict was emphasized. In mid-October of the same year, a visit was held by the Libyan delegation led by Deputy Minister of Transport Hisham Abdullah Abu Shkevat. Meetings were held with the leadership of the Ministry of Agriculture and the Ministry of Industry and Trade of the Russian Federation; roadmap timeline for development of Russian-Libyan economic relations were signed. This visit was organized by a representative of Contact Group from Russian-Libyan Trade House.

On 23 September 2017, Dengov was delegated by the leadership of the Russian Federation for conduct of negotiations in Tripoli. He arrived in Libya on 24 September and within two months he met with key officials, including Libyan Prime Minister Fayez Sarraj, Libyan Deputy Prime Minister Ahmed Maiteeq, Libyan Defense Minister El Mahdi Al Barghathi, Minister of Justice Mohamed Abdulwahid Abdulhamid, and the Head of Security of the Prime Minister Hashim Beshir, representative of the Investigative Committee Rashid Al-Rugbani, Attorney General of Libya, public lawyer Mohamed Abdulwahab, as well as representatives of the tribes of southern Libya (Tubu, Tuareg, sons of Suleiman, Warfalla, Gaddaf) and the leadership of the cities of Ubari, Ghat, Murzuk, Sabha, Gdamez and others. The strategy and prospects for the end of the Libyan conflict, the fate of the Russian prisoners, as well as the course and results of the Tunis process were discussed. On 1–3 December 2017, Dengov participated in the “Mediterranean Dialogues Conference”, on the sidelines of which a number of meetings were held with officials from Italy, Libya, as well as with the UN Special Representative for Libya Gassan Salamé.

In 2018, he organized the panel session “Libya’s Reintegration into the International Economy: Opportunities for Cooperation” at the St. Petersburg International Economic Forum. The Special Presidential Representative for the Middle East and Africa and Deputy Foreign Minister Mikhail Bogdanov, and Libyan Foreign Minister Taher Siyala took part in it.

=== Liberation of Russian and Belarusian citizens in Libya ===
In September 2015, on behalf of the Special Presidential Representative of the President of the Russian Federation for the Middle East, Deputy Foreign Minister M. L. Bogdanov a process was organized for release of the Russian sailors detained at the coasts of Libya on the ship “Mechanic Chebotarev” on charges in oil smuggling.

As a result of the negotiations organized with the Prime Minister of the New General National Congress of Libya Khalifa Al-Ghawil, two citizens and the crew members of the detained tanker “Mikhail Chebotarev” were returned to Russia.

In January 2016, they succeeded to release the remaining seven sailors, who, flew to Moscow with Khalifa Al-Ghawil. Within the framework of the visit of the Prime Minister, the meetings were organized with S.V. Lavrov and M. L. Bogdanov.

However, in March 2016, the negotiation process for release of the remaining detained citizens was interrupted as a result of the formation of the UN-supported Government of National Accord led by Fayez Sarraj.

In October 2016, Dengov held negotiations with Sarraj, Chairman of the Supreme State Council Abdurahman Sewehli, First Deputy Prime Minister Musa al-Koni, head of the Investigative Committee under the Attorney General, As-Sadyk As-Sur, members of the government. As a result of the negotiations, in the same month, it was possible to return the remaining citizens detained on the tanker “Mechanic Chebotarev”, as well as to meet with Russian sailors from the tanker “Temeteron”.

In March 2017, the Russian cargo ship “Merle” with seven Russian citizens on board was detained in the coastal waters of Libya. The issue of their release rested on Contact Group. In April, it was discussed with the delegation of the Government of National Accord, who arrived in Moscow on a visit. It was led by field commander Mohamed Khalil Abubaker Issa.

As a result of the meetings and negotiations held in April 2017, the visit of the Special Representative of the President of the Russian Federation for the Middle East and African countries to Tripoli M.L. Bogdanov to Tripoli was organized, within the framework of which it was managed to release five citizens from the ship “Merle”. Later, in May 2017, the two remaining citizens were released.

Since September 2017, Dengov, at the instruction of the leadership of the Russian Ministry of Foreign Affairs has also been engaged in the release of citizens of Belarus.

In February 2018, after long negotiations with the participation of Dengov, it managed to achieve the release of Belarusian citizen Vyacheslav Kachura in Libya, who had been detained there for six and a half years. Kachura arrived in Libya in June 2011 within a group of international experts from Russia, Ukraine and Belarus. In August 2011, they were detained by the revolutionaries, they were charged with cooperation with the regime of ex-President of Libya Muammar Gaddafi. Later, some of the detainees were released, but until the last moment nothing was known about Kachura.

In 2018, with the participation of Dengov, two citizens of Belarus, Inna Babush and Sergei Zdota, were released in Libya. They worked there as doctors, but at the end of the contracts, the Libyan authorities did not allow them to leave the country. Upon completion of the operation to free the Belarusian doctors, Dengov was awarded the Certificate of Honor of the Ministry of Foreign Affairs of Belarus.

== Personal life ==
Married to the lead vocalist for the group "A-Studio" Keti Topuria.

Raises three kids: Adam, Leonid and daughter Shoshana.
