= Keti Topuria =

Georgian singer (born 1986)

Keti Topuria ქეთევან თოფურია Кетеван Андроевна Топурия
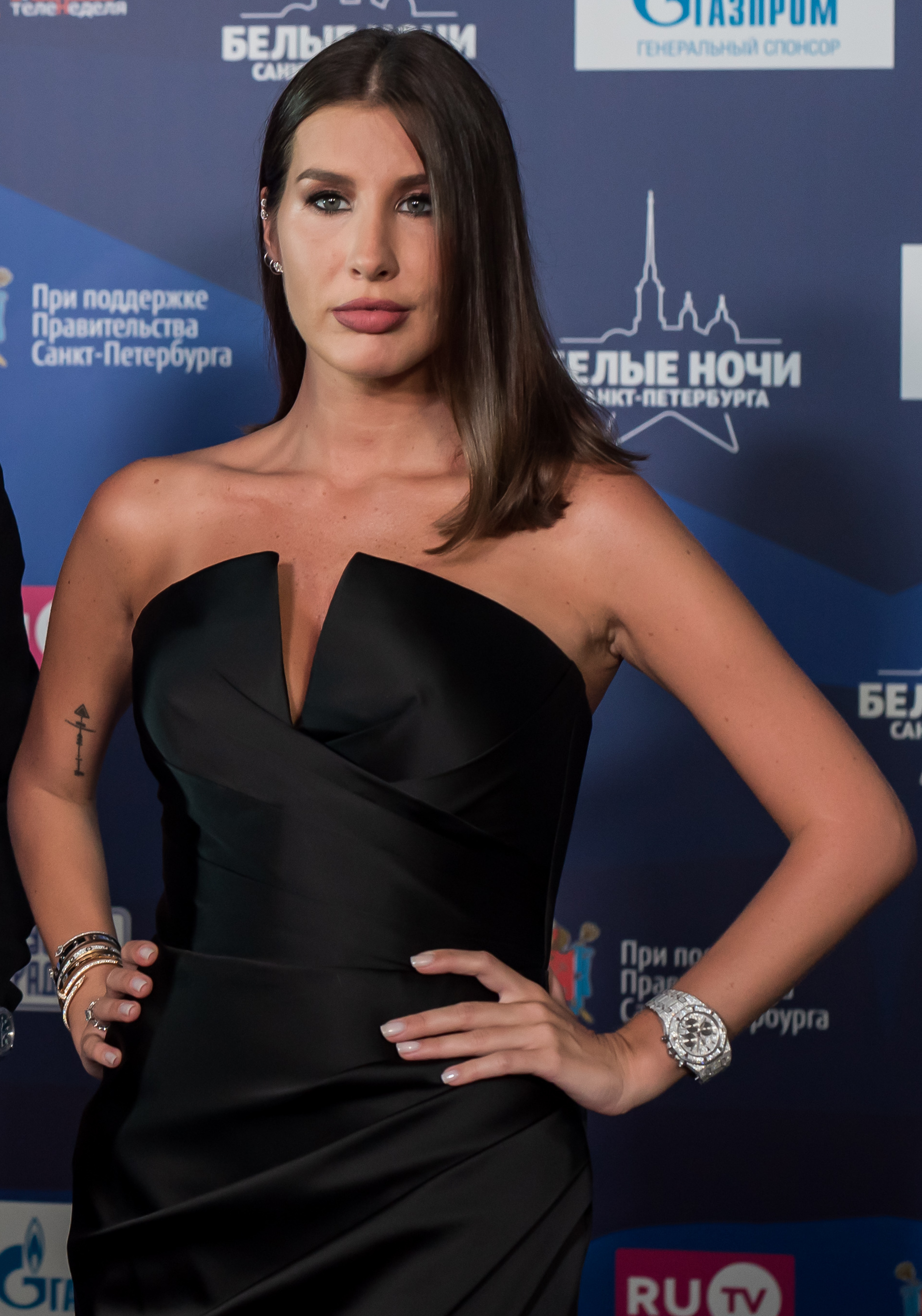

Background information
- Also known as: Keta Topuria
- Born: Ketevan Topuria; 9 September 1986 (age 40); Tbilisi, Georgian SSR, USSR
- Genres: Pop; pop rock; new wave; Russian pop
- Occupation: Singer
- Instrument: Vocals
- Years active: 2005–present
- Labels: Veter Entertainment; Real Records
- Member of: A-Studio

Ketevan "Keti" Topuria (Georgian: ქეთევან "ქეთი" თოფურია; Russian: Кетеван Андроевна Топурия; born 9 September 1986), also sometimes known as Keta Topuria (Georgian: ქეთა თოფურია), is a Georgian-Russian singer and the current lead vocalist for the Kazakh pop music group A-Studio.

== Biography ==
Topuria's late father, Andro Topuria, was a Georgian crime lord, and her mother, Natalia Topuria, is a chemical engineer. They have some Italian and Polish roots.

Topuria has been involved in music since childhood. In 1998, she graduated from Gogi Sudradze Music School in Tbilisi, and in 2003, she graduated music school with a specialty in vocal performance. Also in 2003, Topuria was accepted into the State University of Georgia's psychology department.

== Personal life ==
From 2013 to 2017, she was married to businessman Lev Geykhman (born 1974), whom she met 4 years before their wedding. In the summer of 2017, the couple divorced.

Since 2018, she has been living with Lev Dengov.
