= Virtuosos (TV program) =

Hungarian classical music-based reality competition television program

Virtuosos is a Hungarian classical music-based reality competition television program for children and young adults, contested by players of classical instruments and classical singers drawn from nationwide auditions. The show is broadcast on Hungarian's MTVA network, airing a total of 5 seasons as of 2019. Mariann Peller producer is responsible for developing the format of the show. The show's patron is the wife of the President of Hungary, Mrs. Anita Hercegh.

== Summary ==
Throughout the competition, the contestants perform not only classical pieces, but movie theme songs and crossover music as well. Their performances are judged by 5 professional judges – in the fourth season the judges were András Batta, Gergely Kesselyák, Erika Miklósa, János Balázs, István Várdai. The goal is to discover talented people and provide them with strong professional background, attention, challenges and performance opportunities necessary for growth, and has resulted in auditions by thousands of musicians, and boosting applications to music schools.

== Broadcast ==
The first season of the show began in October 2014 and ended in December 2014. The second season aired from 15 April to 8 June 2016. The third season aired from 7 April to 2 June 2017. A fourth season debuted in April 2018 and the 5th one, a spin-off called "Chamber Virtuosos" was broadcast from 3 May 2019 to 7 June 2019.

== Background ==
Mariann Peller, the brainchild of the public television classical music talent show, launched the competition series with Dániel Vadász. The mission of Virtuózok is to bring classical music closer to people and to encourage more and more parents to give their children music lessons by introducing contestants starting at the age of six. The producers of the show also consider it important that the contestants’ lives are not jeopardized by show business, nor their studies, nor their age-appropriate lifestyle, but that they have access to opportunities in which their talent, diligence, and knowledge can develop in an ideal way. Therefore, in December 2014, Mariann Peller, Erika Miklósa, and András Batta founded the Little Virtuózok Foundation, whose board of trustees is chaired by music historian Dr. Batta. The Foundation provides assistance in educating musicians, organizing their concerts, and supports young talents with scholarships and instrument purchases.

In May 2018 it was announced that Placido Domingo has become a shareholder in Virtuosos Holding Ltd., which owns the international rights to the program.

New shareholders in October 2018: Contessa Maria Bardossy de Weisz Hungarian-born Venezuelan philanthropist is taking the talent show to South America. Peter Draper, former marketing director of Umbro, Manchester United and Valencia CF joins Virtuosos Holding Ltd. as Vice President International Development. Imre Szabó Stein media specialist also becomes a shareholder.

== Seasons 1-4 ==
– Grand Prize winner

Season	First episode	Finale	Winner			Hosts	Judges
Season	First episode	Finale	6–13 y/o	14–19 y/o	20–28 y/o	Hosts	Judges
One	October 17, 2014	December 19, 2014	Misi Boros	Dániel Ali Lugosi	Ivett Gyöngyösi	Edit Varga; Ádám Bősze	Erika Miklósa; András Batta; Gergely Kesselyák; Attila Némethy; Miklós Szenthelyi
Two	April 15, 2016	June 3, 2016	Eszter Holozsai	Tamás Kökény	Gyula Váradi	Edit Varga; Ádám Bősze	Erika Miklósa; András Batta; Gergely Kesselyák; Attila Némethy; Miklós Szenthelyi
Three	April 7, 2017	June 2, 2017	Amira Abouzahara	Radu Kis	Réka Kristóf	Koltay Anna; Ádám Bősze	Erika Miklósa; András Batta; Gergely Kesselyák; Várdai István; Balázs János
Four	April 17, 2018	June 8, 2018	Soma Balázs-Piri	Márk Beke	Ninh Duc Hoang Long	Noémi Morvay; Ádám Bősze	Erika Miklósa; András Batta; Gergely Kesselyák; István Várdai; János Balázs

== Season 5 ==
In 2019, for the fifth season, the show has changed completely, this year it was called the Chamber Virtuosi. Eight ensembles entered the competition, one of which was voted out in each broadcast, leaving three for the final. The participants in this season (finalists in bold):

- Aeris Brass Quintet
- Custos Consort
- **Flautica**
- Harmóniautasok
- Pontasto Guitar Quartet
- **Sárközy Lajos and his ensemble**
- Seven Sax
- **TanBorEn Trio**

The final was won by the TanBorEn Trio, as voted by the audience.

== Season 6 - Virtuosos V4+ ==
In 2020, competitors from five countries - Hungary, Poland, Serbia, the Czech Republic and Slovakia - competed. During the qualifying rounds, four to four competitors from each country qualified for the semi-finals, with two from each country advancing to the semi-finals.

This time, the jury was composed of one member from each country, starting with the semi-finals: Erika Miklósa (Hungary), Alicja Węgorzewska (Poland), Nemanja Radulović, later Silvana Grujić (Serbia), Gabriela Boháčová (Czech Republic) and Peter Valentovič (Slovakia). The sixth member, the "super jury", was a famous artist for each programme: composer Gabriel Prokofiev in the first semi-final, violinist Maksim Vengerov in the second and opera singer and conductor Plácido Domingo in the final. The two presenters were Ida Nowakowska and Thomas Gottschalk.

Season 6 winners:

Hungary - Ildiko Rozsonits (piano)

Poland - Dawid Siwiecki (accordion)

Serbia - Vuk Vukaljović (guitar)

Czech Republic - Martin Sulc (accordion)

Slovakia - Ajna Marosz (recorder)

== Season 7 - Virtuosos V4+ ==
In 2021, Virtuosos V4+ will be joined by Croatia, alongside the Visegrad Four countries (Hungary, Slovakia, Czech Republic, Poland). The international jury will include famous Croatian cellist HAUSER and the one-man "super jury" this year will be world-renowned opera singer-conductor Maestro Plácido Domingo himself. The selection broadcasts started on the 19th of November 2021 on Duna Television.

== Season 8 - Virtuosos V4+ ==
In 2022, Virtuosos V4+ added Slovenia to the Visegrad Four countries (Hungary, Slovakia, Czech Republic, Poland). New this season is the announcement of a super winner from among the competitors from the five countries.

The finalists:

– Grand Prize winner

Area	Winner of Semi Final 1	Winner of Semi Final 2			
Area	Winner of Semi Final 1	Winner of Semi Final 2	Hungary	Levente Somogyi (saxophone)	David Roland Moses (piano)
Poland	Paweł Libront (clarinet)	Maciej Kasperek (flute)			
Slovenia	Patricija Avšič (violin)	Evelin Greblo (harp)			
Czech Republic	Roman Červinka (violin)	Ondřej Toman (clarinet)			
Slovakia	Mário Gecašek (accordion)	Klára Valentovičová (flute)			

The "super winner", i.e. the winner of the Best of Talents award, was Patricija Avšič. Her identity was decided solely by a secret vote of the ten contestants, in such a way that the contestants could not vote for themselves or for another representative from their country.

== Season 9 - Virtuosos V4+ ==
Season 9 will begin on December 29, 2023. In this season of Virtuosos V4+, in addition to the participants from the Visegrad Four countries (Hungary, Slovakia, the Czech Republic, Poland), invited young Ukrainians were also given the opportunity to present themselves. In the end, no winner was chosen from among them, and both left as winners.

The competition jury has been expanded with three new members: violinist-conductor András Keller, singer and composer Plácido Domingo Jr., and singer Dimash Qudaibergen.

The finalists:

– Grand Prize winner

Area	Semi finalists			
Area	Hungary	Mariam Abouzahra (violin)	Adam Balogh (piano)	Ali Lugosi (clarinet)
Poland	Zarina Zaradna (harp)	Małgorzata Cieszko (oboe)		
Czech Republic	Katerina Švecová (violin)	Ondřej Toman (clarinet)		
Slovakia	Teo Gertler (violin)	Nina Bočkajová (violin)		
Ukraine	Tymofii Zherebtsov (piano)	Amelia Anisovych (singer)		

== Season 10 - Virtuosos V4+ ==
Season 10 began on April 25, 2025 with a broadcast of 'Virtuosos:Superstars and Young Prodigies' concert that took place in Singapore's The Star Theatre, The Star Performing Arts Center on October 21, 2024.

The classical music talent search competition will begin with the Hungarian semi-final on May 2, 2025. Talents from five countries (Hungary, Austria, Montenegro, Serbia and Slovenia) will be competing.

== The Young Virtuosos Foundation ==
The creators of the show support young musicians even after the end of the series. For this, the "Young Virtuosos Foundation" was set up to help these young artists with professional and financial support, scholarships and by organizing concerts at the most prestigious venues in the world, from the United States through Europe to Asia.

Some of the young musicians discovered by Virtuosos perform every year on the New Year’s Eve concert at the Hungarian Academy of Music or at Müpa (Palace of Arts Budapest), which is occasionally broadcast on national TV. Other memorable performances include the Hungarian week in Shanghai, the grand opening event of Hungary's Visegrad Four Presidency, at the Strasbourg Human Right Convention at the Palace of Europe, the opening ceremony of Formula 1 Hungarian Grand Prix, for the delegates of the Budapest NATO summit, at the Kossuth Award gala, at the Olympics’ honouring ceremony near the Hungarian Parliament, and also at Asia Music Festival in Shenzhen for an audience of 40.000.

== The Virtuosos Ensemble ==
Virtuosos discovered dozens of brilliant talents in every season. The main goal is to keep these young talents in the music industry, give them further opportunity of professional development and performing. So the Young Virtuosos Foundation created and supports a small chamber orchestra formed by some of the greatest talents discovered in Virtuosos. The Virtuosos Ensemble essentially expresses what the Virtuosos movement is about: the love of music and each other, the gesture of that improving the whole community by playing music together and, of course, the flourishing talent that makes the Virtuosos Ensemble concerts so stunning. Not only the performance of the team led by Szüts Apor is impressive, but also their creativity. A new musical brand is being born here: this unique chamber ensemble type had not previously exist in classical music, because here everyone is a soloist and also a team player. The proceeds of their concerts often benefit the Young Virtuosos Foundation.
