= Aidar Abzhakhanov =

Kazakhstani composer

Aidar Abzhakhanov (Kazakh: Aıdar Abjahanov; born in Alma-Ata, now Almaty) is the conductor of the Astana Opera.

== Biography ==
Abzhakhanov began his musical studies at the age of seven. When he was thirteen, he attended the Almaty School for Talented Children where he continued his studies/piano. After graduation from the Almaty School, he attended Almaty State Conservatory where he completed his studies in conducting.

At 17 he debuted as conductor with Kazakh State Symphonic Orchestra. He moved to the Saint Petersburg Conservatory to study conducting with Ilya Musin and graduated in 2004 in class of Alexander Titov.

In 2005 Abzhakhanov participated in Bartok Festival Savaria Symphony in Szombathely, Hungary, and has been accepted to the master classes of Zoltán Peskó. Late that year he participated at master classes with Vidin Philharmonic, Vienna, Austria, with Salvador Mas Conde.

In 2006 he participated in the festival Memory without Borders where he conducted Shostakovitch's Symphony No. 7. The same year in September, he joined festival World Stars in Astana with Montserrat Caballé, Roberto Alagna, Valeria Esposito and many others.

Since 2000 Abzhakanov is conductor at State Opera and Ballet Theatre in Astana, Kazakhstan. He was musical director of the following ballets and operas: The Nutcracker and Swan Lake by Tchaikovsky, Giselle and Le Corsaire by Alphonse Adam, Coppélia by Delibes, La Esmeralda by Cesare Pugni, La Sylphide by Løvenskiold, Chopiniana by Chopin, Carnaval by Robert Schumann, Polovtsian Dances by Alexander Borodin, La Bayadère and Don Quixote by Ludwig Minkus and others.

He received the award Honored Worker of the Republic of Kazakhstan in 2013 for the professional achievements and contribution to the formation of world classical art.
