= Baigali Serkebayev =

Kazakh musician

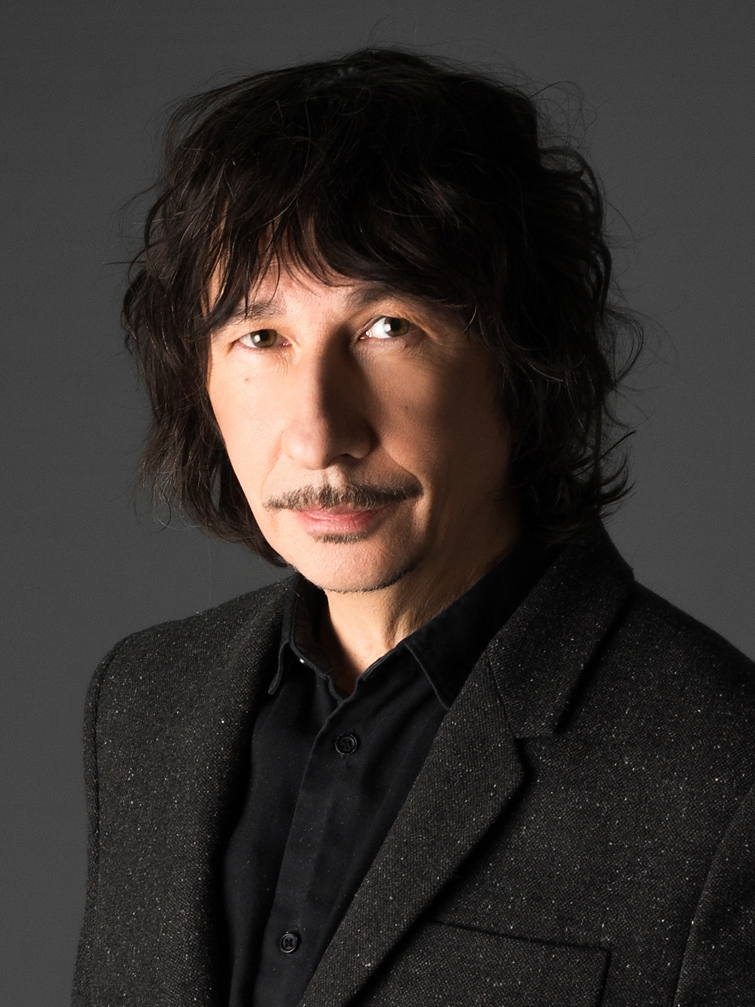
- Serkebayev in 2017
- Born: Kazakh: Байғали Ермекұлы Серкебаев; June 27, 1958 (age 68); Alma-Ata, Kazakh SSR
- Occupations: Keyboardist record producer
- Years active: 1987–present
- Organization: A-Studio
- Spouse: Raushan Serkebayeva
- Children: 2 daughters

Baigali Ermekovich Serkebayev (Kazakh: Байғали Ермекұлы Серкебаев, born June 27, 1958) is a Soviet and Kazakhstani musician, pianist, arranger, producer, songwriter, founder and leader of the band A'Studio. He is an Honored Artist of the Republic of Kazakhstan.

== Biography ==
Baigali Serkebayev was born in Alma-Ata, Kazakh SSR, on June 27, 1958. His family was that of Ermek Bekmukhamedovich Serkebayev, an opera singer. His father wished for Baigali to become a pianist or a conductor. Baigali started playing the piano at age 5; he is now a graduate of Kulyash Baiseitova's music academy and Kurmangazy Almaty Conservatoire (Piano).

After completion of his course at the conservatoire, Baigali Serkebayev joined Aray, a band led by the Kazakh composer and conductor Taskyn Okapov. The band performed with singer Roza Rymbayeva. Aray broke up in 1982, and Roza suggested that Baigali should form and lead a new band. Despite the situation, the band kept the name "Aray" until 1987, when it became Alma-Ata. A year later, it released its first album, titled Put’ bez Ostanovok (The Non-Stop Journey), and changed its name to Almata-Studio. In 1990, one of the band's songs, "Julia," attracted the attention of Alla Pugacheva, who first invited the band to join her musical theater, and then to the Christmas Meetings TV show, where Almata-Studio was presented as the best band in the Soviet Union. During the same year, Aleksey Berkovich, a director and cameraman, proposed to make a feature-length musical movie named Julia. The movie was shot in Almaty, Odesa, and London.

Baigali Serkebayev later became the producer of The Jigits, another Kazakhstani boy band, which consisted of graduates of the Star Factory in Almaty.

In August 2015, Baigali Serkebayev and his eldest daughter, Kamila, established the Ermek Serkebayev Foundation for Culture and Arts to support young performers, promote their education and development, establish grants and scholarships, and organize public concerts in Kazakhstan and abroad.

== Family ==
Baigali Serkebayev and his wife, Raushan, have two daughters named Kamila and Sana.

== Awards ==
- Top Hit Music Awards — Producer of the Year (2014);
- Order of Kurmet (2017);
- Honored Artist of the Republic of Kazakhstan (2017);
- MUZ-TV 2016 Special Award for Contribution to the Development of the Music Industry.
