= Birzhan and Sara =

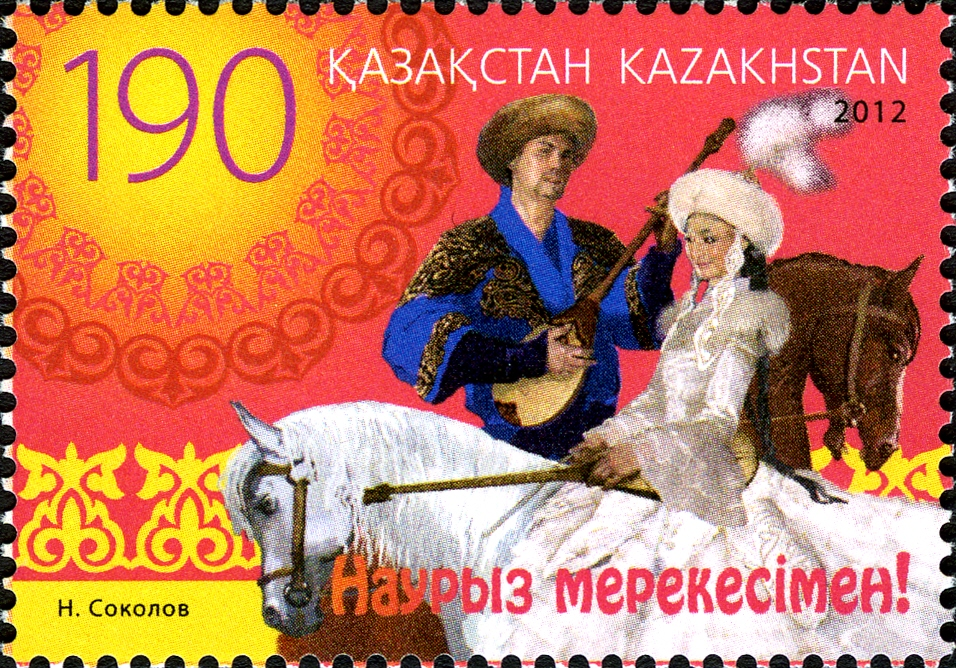
Birzhan and Sara on a Kazahk stamp

Birzhan and Sara (Russian: Биржан и Сара) is an opera of 2 acts and 4 scenes by the Kazakh composer Mukan Tulebaev (1914–1973) to a libretto by Khazhim Djumaliev (1907–1968) in Kazakh language, inspired by the aytys (folk poetry) of Birzhan and Sara.

== Performance history ==
The opera premiered in Almaty (Alma-Ata) on November 7, 1946, and was performed in Moscow on December 6, 1958.

The libretto has been adapted in Turkish, and the opera was played in Samsun in 2013, and in Istanbul, Bursa, Eskişehir and Ankara in 2014.

The work is part of Astana Opera's repertoire.

== Roles ==
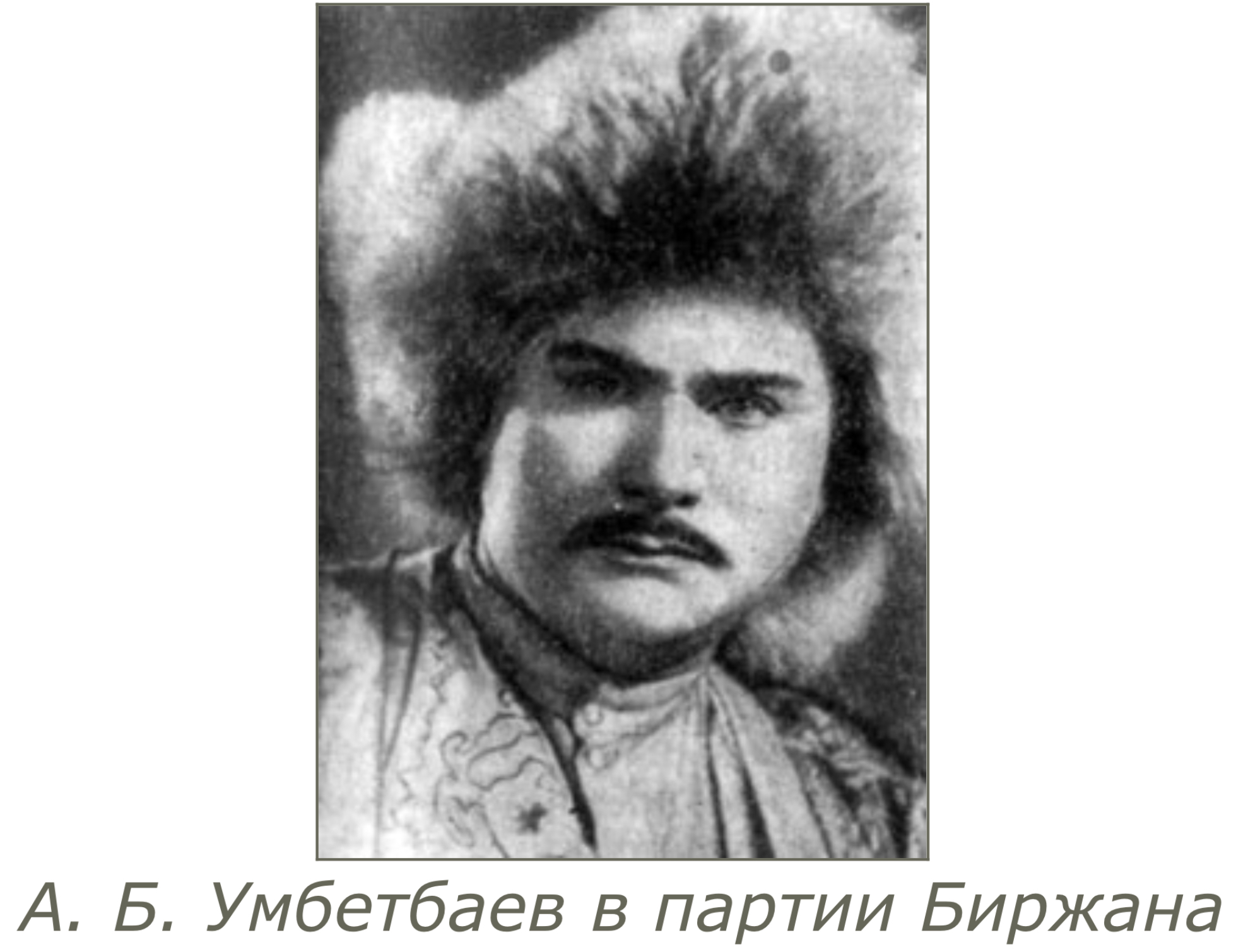
Änwarbek Beýsembaýulı Ümbetbayev in the role of Birzhan

- Birzhan, poet and popular singer – tenor
- Birzhan's mother – mezzo-soprano
- Birzhan's father – baritone
- Estay, friend of Birzhan – tenor
- Sara, popular singer – soprano
- Zhienkul, bey – bariton
- Zhambota, local chief – baritone
- Altynay, Zhambota's daughter – soprano
- Serik, Zhanbota's bodyguard – tenor

== Synopsis ==
Different variants of the story exist, as the libretto has been adapted several times, being translated into Turkish, or to create a different staging.

=== Act 1 ===
- Scene 1

During a fair Birzhan and Sara, both popular singers, sing a lyric duet in the main square of the Kazakh village of Kuyandy; inhabitants gather around them to listen. Altynay, in love with Birzhan, questions Estay to know whether her feelings are shared, and manages to find out that Birzhan is in love with Sara. Local chief Zhanbota, Altynay's father, comes to the market place with his brother Zhienkul and his guards. Zhienkul wants Sara to marry him and become his fourth wife. Sara refuses, and Birjan sings a song to make fun of Zhanbota and Zhienkul. Gards grasp him. As the village people show their disapproval, Zhanbota and his guards leave. People rejoice that Sara and Bizhan are safe

- Scene 2

Birzhan is near a lake and sings his love to Sara, playing music with his dombra. Village people, including Birzhan's parents, join him and warn him to distrust Zhanbota. Birzhan is not afraid, and sings the freedom of people, evoking the famous poet Abai. Altynay came to see Birzhan, but Estay prevents her to meet him. Birzhan and Sara swear each other faithfulness and eternal love. Zhanbota comes and abducts Sara to bring her to Zhienkula.

=== Act 2 ===
- Scene 1

Preparation of the wedding of Sara and Zhienkul. Sara says him that she will never accept to be his wife. Birzhan comes. Zhienkul is angry and calls his gards. Birzhan is arrested

- Scene two

Serik falls asleep while guarding Birzhan's cell. Sara comes, manages to take the keys of the cell from him, and joins her lover. Altynay sees everything and warns Zhienkul. The bey intervenes, and orders an immediate trial for Sara, which takes place immediately, and Sara is sentenced to death. But Zhienkul cannot appreciate the execution of the sentence, as a crowd of village people, led by Estay, frees Birzhan and Sara. Desesperated, Altynay comes close to Sara and stabs her. Sara dies. Heartbroken, Birzhan laies on his beloved for the last time.

==== Variant ====
Under different variants, Birzhan might die instead of Sara.
