= Türkçevizyon =

Annual music festival in Denizli, Turkey

Uluslarası Türkçe Sözlü Müzik Festivali (Turkish: International Festival of Music with Turkish Lyrics), or simply Türkçevizyon, is an annual music festival in Denizli, Turkey since 2009.

The festival is hosted by Denizli municipality and Turkish Radio and Television Corporation. Unlike Türkvizyon, a similar contest hosted by TRT, Türkçevizyon is not solely competitive, during the festival, concerts and other cultural activities are also scheduled. The Gala night is located in Pamukkale Antique Theatre, and all participants sing only in Turkish language.

The festival aims to emphasize the importance of Turkish, however it is widely criticized for having "-vision" or "festival" words, which are not Turkish originated. The festival, as well as Turkvizyon contest, are both considered as a Turkish alternative to Eurovision Song Contest, which Turkey is inactive since 2012.

The festival logo contains a rooster, which is the symbol of Denizli.

== Years ==
Edition	Year	Participant countries
1	23–28 June 2009	16
2	30 May-3 June 2010	25
3	14–17 June 2011	21
4	14 September 2013	21
5	10–13 September 2014	22

== See also ==
- Türkvizyon Song Contest
