= Mayra Muhammad-kyzy =

Maira Kerey
- Also known as: Maira Kerey, Myra Kerey
- Born: Mayra Muhammad-kyzy (Kazakh: Майра Мұхамедқызы); 5 September 1969 (age 56); Yining, Xinjiang, China
- Origin: Kazakh
- Genres: Opera, classical
- Occupation: Opera singer (soprano)
- Instruments: Vocals, piano

Mayra Muhammad-kyzy (Maira Kerey - Myra Kerey, Kazakh: Maıra Muhamedqyzy), (born 5 September 1969) is a Kazakh opera singer. She was the first Kazakh at the Parisian Grand Opera. She is a Honored Artist of the Republic.

== Life ==
Mayra Muhammad-kyzy was born and raised in China. Her grandfathers emigrated to China from the Kazakh steppes in the 1930s, fleeing from the arbitrariness of Soviet rule. Her musical parents (father - well known in China composer and collector of Kazakh folk songs, her mother - a prominent singer, and People's Artist of China) taught her to play the piano and sing, recorded in the local music school. In 1987, she graduated from the music faculty of the Central University of Peoples of China, and later the Beijing Conservatory, where she studied with Guo Shu Jen.

Since 1987, Mayra has actively participated in the country, she took part in the all-Chinese vocal competition "Golden Dragon", and also taught at the university for six years. But, the China-based Beijing Opera put only two European opera performances a year. In 1991, Mayra traveled to Moscow with her husband Aksan and auditioned at the Moscow Conservatory - she was immediately given a recommendation for postgraduate study. But she did not have permission .In 1994, Mayra again found herself in Moscow as part of the soloists from China at the Tchaikovsky Competition, from which she literally fled to Kazakhstan, to her historic homeland. But Kazakh citizenship was received only two years later, thanks to a meeting with President Nazarbayev and PRC President Jiang Zemin, and later managed to transport the entire family.

Mayra was fluent in her native Kazakh and Chinese languages, but she did not know Russian or Italian or French, while the main operas from world classics were performed in these languages. In Almaty, she began her internship (1994-1996) at the Kazakh National Conservatory. where she studied with Nadia Sharipova. She lived with her husband for several years in a rented apartment.

In 1995, Mayra Muhamed-kyzy was awarded a special diploma for artistry in St. Petersburg at the 1st International Rimsky-Korsakov Young Opera Singers Competition.

In 1996 she auditioned and became one of the singers of the GAOB Abai in Almaty.

In 1997, she received an invitation to an international contest of opera singers in Portugal. Theater director K. G. Urazgaliev helped with her ticket. 66 performers from 17 countries took part in the competition, but Mayra won the Grand Prize of 10,000 US dollars. .

In 1998, at the International Tchaikovsky Competition, she was in the lead, but she won the 3rd laureate place (first laureate from Kazakhstan). In the republic her skill was finally recognized: she was awarded the title of Honored Artist.

In 2002, Mayra won a two-year contract (2003-2005) in Paris Opera.

Already in France, she adopted the pseudonym Maira Kerey (her father Mohammed Abdikadyr-uly from the Naiman clan, but Kalap Kuanyshi-kyzy's mother is from the Kerey family), and for six months she studied French, and then Italian and English.

She made her debut in Giacomo Puccini's opera La Bohème. She performed Musette's part. This part takes a special place in her work. The singer herself calls her "role number 1", since it was her performance in 2003 in Paris,

In December 2015, Mayra was invited to Astana Opera as a leading soloist .

== Career ==
Mayra began her career on European stages with her debut in Opéra National de Paris as Musette in La Bohème with Roberto Alagna, and then as Adina in Donizetti's opera L'elisir d'amore in Opéra national de Lorraine in Nancy, then Opéra de Rennes, Théâtre de Caen, and Grand Théâtre de Bordeaux.

In 2003, at the invitation of Plácido Domingo, Mayra sang at the Washington National Opera (USA), along with the Mirella Freni in Tchaikovsky's opera The Maid of Orleans.

In 2004 she sang in Strasbourg at the National Opera House in the heroic-romantic opera L'Africaine by Giacomo Meyerbeer.

In 2006, with the troupe of the National Opera Theater, she toured France with 30 performances of Donizetti's opera L'elisir d'amore.

She performed in the British Cadogan Hall with the London Philharmonic Orchestra in a concert dedicated to the 15th anniversary of Kazakhstan's independence.

In 2007, she held a solo concert in Beijing on the main stage of China - in the palace "John Shan Li Tan" at the invitation of the Ministry of Culture of the PRC.

In 2013, she performed at the gala opening of the Astana Opera.

== Critical reception ==
- "I would give her the first prize, based on a single consideration: if now there was an opera poster with her name somewhere, I would definitely go to her performance - I can not say anything about one other participant. is fresh, sonorous, beautiful, in the artistic nature there is a delightful eastern transparency, almost all the difficulties were successful - I wanted to listen with bated breath "(Pyotr Pospelov," Russian Telegraph ").
- Gay City News wrote: "Myra Kerey demonstrated an exciting performance, a bright and strong soprano."
- "Myra Kerey's brilliant debut took place with her bright, crystal-clear voice, which should return here in a bigger role," wrote The Washington Times
