= Abai (opera) =

Kazakh opera

Abai (Kazakh: Абай) is an opera in two acts, created by Akhmet Zhubanov and Latif Khamidi, on a libretto of Mukhtar Auezov, inspired by a slice of the life of the poet Abai Qunanbaiuli (1845–1904).

Created on December 24, 1944, at the Kazakh Abai Opera and Ballet Theater during the year preceding the centenary of Qunanbaiuli's birth, it is considered one of "the most beautiful operas written in Kazakh language".

== History ==
For the premiere, the distribution, upon direction of Jandarbekov, included Rishat Abdulin (as Abai), Kulyash Baisseitova (as Ajar) and Anuarbek Umbetbayev (as Aidar).

The opera has been performed in Moscow in 1958 and 2024, in Berlin and Dresden in 1986, in Paris at the Théâtre des Champs-Élysées on October 26, 2014, in Genoa at the Teatro Carlo Felice on November 8, 2018, and in Tashkent at the Alisher Navoi State Academic Bolshoi Theatre on July 10, 2019.

The opera is part of the repertoire of the Astana Opera and Abai Kazakh National Opera and Ballet Theatre.

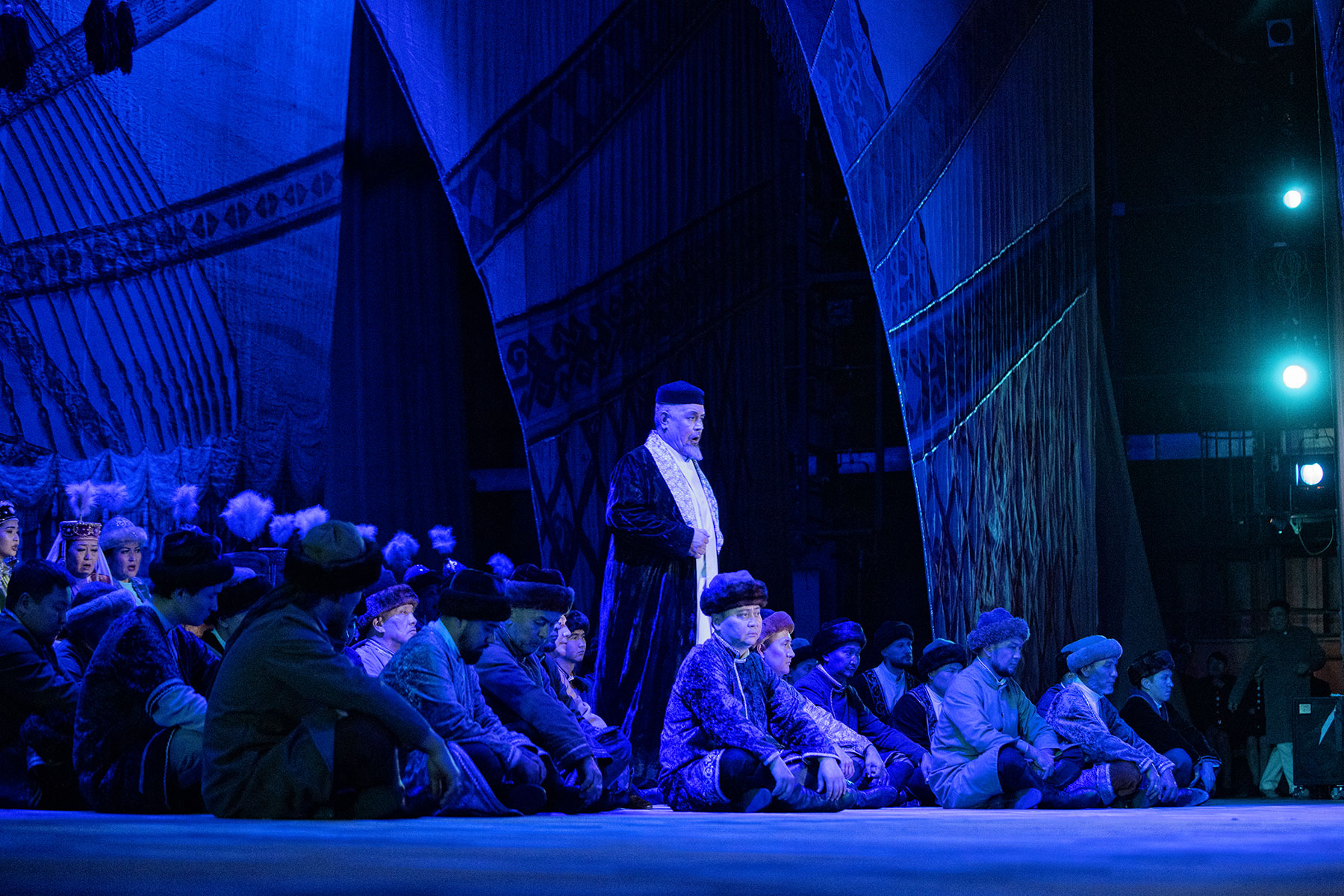

== Scenario ==
Abai helps Aidar, one of his disciples, and his fiancé, Ajar, to overcome the obstacles to their wedding, but a rival poisons the young man.

=== Act I ===
- First scene

While fleeing by night, Aidar and Ajar are caught by the members of the clan of Narymbet, spouse of Ajar by arranged marriage. Aidar invokes the name of Abai as his protector, but it only increases the anger of their chasers, who decide to tie him to a horse and to drag him. Abai comes and intervene in favor of the young couple, swearing to protect them. The question should be brought before the Aqsaqal. Jirenshe, an influential man, partisan of the clan of Narymbeta, asks Azim, another disciple of Abai, to convince Ajar to return in her village, and to deliver up Aidar. Azim declines. Nevertheless, Azim is jealous of the poetic talent of Aidar and of the preference Abai shows towards him. The aqsaqal visits Abai, and asks to hear Ajar. The latter explains that only love drove her to abandon her spouse, infringe the tradition and join Aidar.

- Second scene

Judgement scene upon presidency of Syrttan. Jirenshe requires the death of Aidar and the return of Ajar in her village. Azim defends Aidar, but his argumentation turns contradicted; then, Abai pleads the cause of the young couple, and wins the case. Jirenshe and the members of the clan of Narymbet swear to make Aidar perish.

=== Act II ===
- Third scene

Celebration of Ajar and Aidar's wedding. Azim pours poison in Aidar's cup. Aidar begins a song in honour of his beloved spouse, and collapses before the end of his song.

- Fourth scene

Aidar dies. Jirenshe is first suspected of the poisoning, then Azim is declared guilty of the murder. Azim is punished, but the people is in mourning. The opera ends with Abai leading his people and encouraging him to move forward.

== Music ==
The music is inspired by traditional folkloric Kazakh songs and melodies, which granted to the opera a wide success, above all due to the arias of Abai (Айттым сәлем Қаламқас: "I come to greet you, Kalamkas..."); and Ұзын қайың: "birch"). The aria Қай талқы: "What is the point?"), in which Abai hopefully sings of the future of the people, has become an emblematic musical theme.

== Literature ==
- Abai on the national encyclopedy Almaty, 2004 (ISBN 9965-9389-9-7) (Russian).
