= Astana Opera =

Opera house in Astana, Kazakhstan

- Астана Oпера
- Interactive map of the Astana Opera area

General information
- Status: Completed
- Location: Astana, Kazakhstan
- Coordinates: 51°8′8″N 71°24′39.3″E
- Completed: 2010
- Inaugurated: 2013
- Cost: $300 million

Height
- Top floor: 32 m

Dimensions
- Other dimensions: Scene area of 3.000 m^{2}

Technical details
- Floor area: 64.163 m^{2}

Design and construction
- Architecture firm: Arlotti-Beccu-Desideri-Raimondo (ABDR)
- Services engineer: Theatreplan
- Main contractor: Mabetex Group

Other information
- Seating capacity: 1250 (Opera Hall), 250 (Chamber Hall)

Astana Opera (Kazakh: Астана Oпера, romanized: Astana Opera) is an opera house in Astana, Kazakhstan, on the basis of an executive order of Nursultan Nazarbayev.

== History of design and construction ==
The design has been partially made by Nursultan Nazarbayev, and the construction began on 6 July 2010 under direction of Mabetex Group. The Opera House sits on a 9 ha site. The opera house opened in 2013, the inaugurative representation being the Kazakh opera Birzhan and Sara. The acoustics of the theatre is considered one of the best in the world and it was designed by the Italian Enrico Moretti (Biobyte) and Maria Cairoli.

== Description ==
The opera house includes two halls:

- the Main Hall (1250 seats), which hosts opera and ballet performances, and has an orchestra pit with room for up to 120 musicians,
- the Chamber Hall (250 seats), for chamber music concerts.

It is the second newly built opera house in Astana, as the Palace of Peace and Reconciliation, hosting a 1500 seats opera hall, was completed in 2006. It is considered the third biggest opera house in the world; one of its remarkable characteristics is the 1.6 ton chandelier hanging in the 13 m high concourse. The opera house has also several facilities, such as a restaurant and all installations required for the troupe's rehearsals. The style of the opera house is inspired by the Ancient Greek architecture, but also include typical elements of the national heritage, such as frescos of Sharyn Canyon and Burabay.

== Troupe and repertoire ==
The opera house hosts its own orchestra, ballet, and opera troupe, performing mostly opera. Their repertoire includes major pieces, such as the operas La traviata or Tosca and the ballet The Nutcracker, but also national pieces, such as the operas Abai and Birzhan and Sara. The orchestra is 90% young musicians. The troupe was on tour in 2014, performing in New York City, Toronto and Paris.

== Related videos ==
Here are some videos recorded inside the opera house or in the nearby area:

1. Astana Opera House
2. Sara Birzhan performance
3. Ballet performance in Astana Opera House
4. Celebration of victory day in front of Astana Opera House

== See also ==
- Aidar Abzhakhanov, conductor at Astana Opera
