= A-Studio =

Russian-Kazakhstani music group

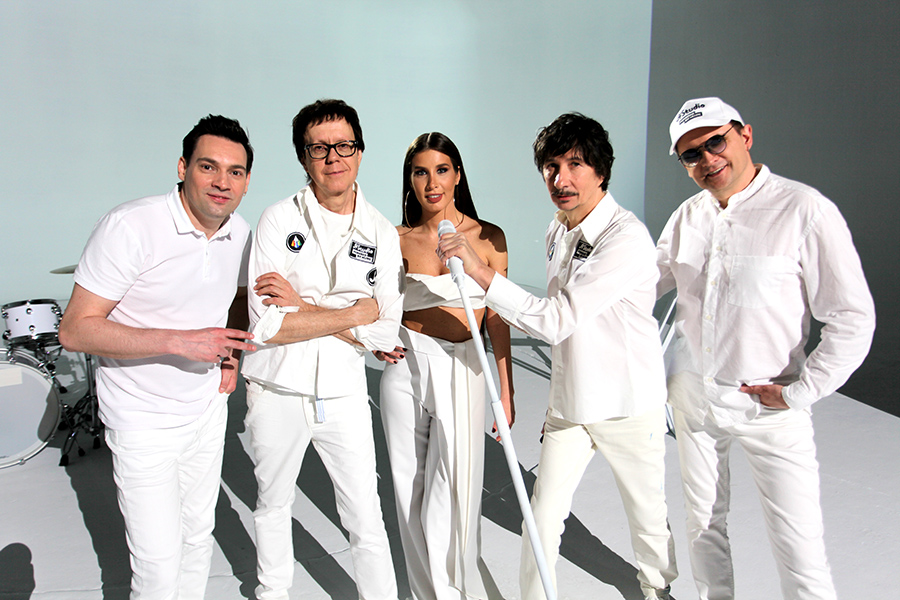

Background information
- Also known as: А-Студио
- Origin: Almaty, Kazakhstan
- Genres: Pop, rock, Russian pop, new wave, soft rock, funk, R&B
- Years active: 1982-1988 (Alma-Ata Studio), 1988-present (A-Studio)
- Labels: Melody Records(1988-1993); Soyuz Records (1994-1997); ORT-Records (1998-2000); NOX Music (2001-2004); Ark Records (UK) (2004); Veter Entertainment (Prof-Music Records) (2005-2009); Real Records (2010 - present)
- Members: Keti Topuria; Baigali Serkebayev; Vladimir Mikloshich; Fedor "Federico" Dossumov
- Past members: Baglan Sadvakasov; Tamerlan Sadvakasov; Najib Vildanov; Batyrkhan Shukenov; Bulat Syzdykov; Igor Lutsiv; Sagnay Abdullin; Polina Griffith
- Website: astudio.ru

A-Studio, stylized as a'studio, is a Russian-based Kazakhstani pop music group originally consisting of Baigali Serkebayev (keyboard), Vladimir Mikloshich (bass), Baglan Sadvakasov (solo guitar) and frontman Batyrkhan Shukenov (vocal and sax). The band was created in 1982 in Almaty, then called Alma-Ata, hence called "Alma-Ata Studio". Later, the name was changed to "A-Studio". Currently the group's members are Georgian frontwoman Keti Topuria, Baigali Serkebayev and Vladimir Mikloshich.

During their career, the group achieved popularity in Central Asia and Eastern Europe. In 2015, A-Studio were named best pop group of the year according to the ZD Awards. The group performed a duet with Tomas N'Evergreen with the song "Falling for You".

== History ==
In 1989, the song "Julia" (Джулия) by the group "A-Studio" was liked by Russian pop icon Alla Pugacheva, who invited the group to perform at her Christmas Meetings music festival in Moscow in 1990.

In 2000, Shukenov left the band to pursue a solo career, while A-Studio introduced a new vocalist, Polina Griffith. The band released several singles of songs with Griffith on vocals, including "S.O.S", which reached #64 on the UK Singles Chart and gained popularity in Europe and the USA.

In August 2004, Griffith left the band to pursue solo work. As a result, a new vocalist, Keti Topuria, originally from Tbilisi, Georgia, joined A-Studio. Together, they released popularly acclaimed singles such as "Uletayu" ("Flying Away"), "Ty" ("You"), "Noch'-Podruga" ("Night-Friend"). "Uletayu" ("Flying Away") hit the charts in Central Asia and Eastern Europe, bringing renewed popularity to the group. However, this successful new beginning was clouded by the death of Baglan Sadvakasov on 2 August 2006 as the result of a car accident. His place in the band was taken by his son, 17-year-old Tamerlan Sadvakasov. Later, as the younger Sadvakasov left the band to pursue education, Fedor "Federico" Dossumov became the solo-guitarist for A-Studio. At different times during the late 1990s, A-Studio worked with Greg Walsh, famous UK sound-producer.

Their single, "Fashion Girl", was released in mid-2010 and is included in the album "Volny". It achieved modest popularity in Russia and Eastern Europe. The music video shot for the song was finished on November 8, 2010, according to their official website. In the video, the members of the group are trying to construct a female robot in a laboratory, set in a 1960s-1970s setting. The director of the clip is German Glinski, a Ukrainian video designer.

In 2017 they performed at the Rendezvous music festival in Jurmala.

== Awards and nominations ==
Award	Year	Nominee(s)	Category	Result	Ref.
MTV Europe Music Awards	2007	Themselves	Best Russian Act	Nominated	
MTV Europe Music Awards	2010	Themselves	Best Russian Act	Nominated	
Поколение Video Festival	1998	"Грешная страсть"	Special Award	Won	

== Discography ==
Since 1988, A-Studio has released 14 albums, including 10 studio albums, 3 live albums and 1 compilation album. These include:

- "Put' Bez Ostanovok" (Путь Без Остановок, Road Without Stops, 1988)
- "Dzhuliya" (Джулия, Julia, 1990)
- "A-Studio" (А-Студио, 1993)
- "Soldat Lyubvi" (Солдат Любви, Soldier of Love, 1994)
- "A-Studio Live" (1995)
- "Nelyubimaya" (Нелюбимая, Unloved, 1996)
- "The Best" (1997)
- "Greshnaya Strast'" (Грешная Страсть, Sinful Passion, 1998)
- "Takie Dela" (Такие Дела, This Is It, 2001)
- "Uletayu" (Улетаю, Flying Away, 2005)
- "905" (2007)
- "Total" (2008)
- "Volny" (Волны, Waves, 2010)
- "Koncert v Kremle 25 let" (Концерт в Кремле 25 лет, Concert in Kremlin 25 years, 2015)

== See also ==
- Russian pop music
