= Igor Krutoy =

Russian music composer, performer, producer

Igor Krutoy Игорь Крутой
- Krutoy in 2024
- Born: Igor Yakovlevich Krutoy; July 29, 1954 (age 72); Haivoron, Ukrainian SSR, USSR (Now Ukraine)
- Occupations: Composer, music producer, television producer, singer, pianist, keyboardist, accordionist
- Years active: 1980s–present
- Title: People's Artist of Russia (1996) People's Artist of Ukraine (2011)
- Awards: Order "For Merit to the Fatherland" (2nd ,3rd, 4th class); Order of Friendship
- Musical career
- Genres: Classical crossover; Neoclassical music; Pop; Blue-eyed soul; funk; operatic pop; instrumental
- Instruments: Piano; keyboard; melodica; vocals
- Label: АRS Records
- Website: igorkrutoy.com

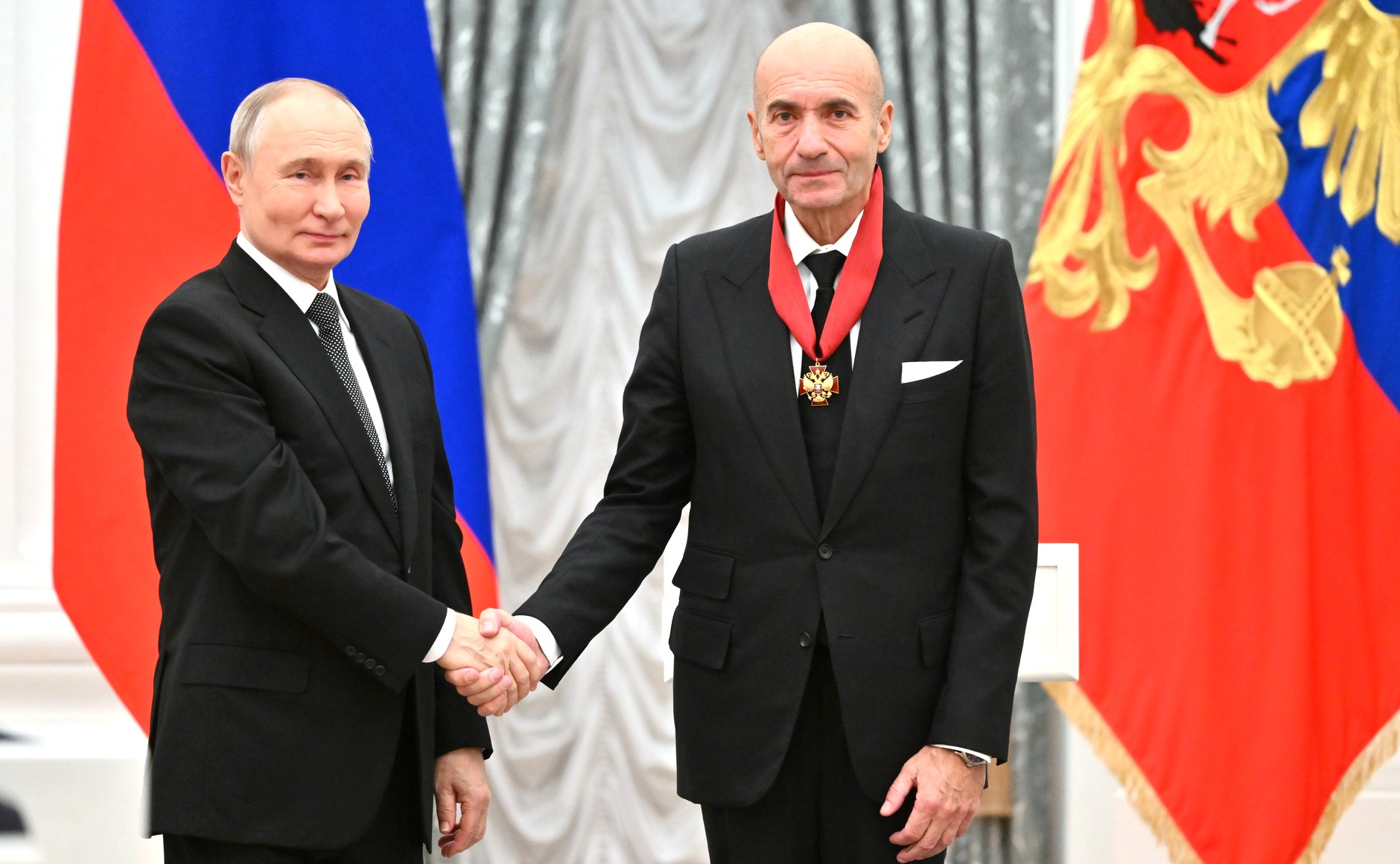
Igor Krutoy being awarded the Order "For Merit to the Fatherland" II degree, December 12, 2024

Igor Yakovlevich Krutoy (Russian: Игорь Яковлевич Крутой) or Ihor Yakovych Krutyi born on July 29, 1954), is a Ukrainian-Russian music composer, performer, producer and musical promoter.

Krutoy was awarded the title "Honoured Artist of the Russian Federation", People's Artist of Russia and People's Artist of Ukraine. Winner of ZD Awards, and Ovation Award.

As a composer, he has collaborated with numerous singers in classical and pop music, such as Anna Netrebko, Dmitri Hvorostovsky, Aida Garifullina, Andrea Bocelli, Sumi Jo, Alla Pugacheva, Lara Fabian, Dimash Qudaibergen, Valery Leontyev, Ani Lorak, Sergey Lazarev, Irina Allegrova, Mikhail Shufutinsky and others.

Since 2002, together with Raymonds Pauls, he organized the New Wave competition for young performers.

"Blue Planet"

== Life and career ==
Igor Krutoy was born on July 29, 1954, in Haivoron, Kirovograd Oblast to Jewish parents. When he was young, he taught himself to play the accordion, and later played in the school band. Krutoy studied at the musical school, and after graduation he entered the Theory faculty at Kirovograd music college, where he graduated with distinction in 1974. He failed to enter the Kiev Conservatory and spent the following year giving accordion classes in Haivoron and Bandurovo village. Next year Krutoy entered Nikolaev State Pedagogical Institute at conductor (choral music) department. While studying there, he worked in restaurants, where he met singer Aleksander Serov, who later would become his friend and perform many of his songs. During that period Krutoy also worked as artistic director of Valentina Tolkunova band and gave performances accompanying Russian male actor Yevgeny Leonov.
In 1979, he was invited to Moscow Concert Orchestra "Panorama", where he worked together with artists such as Leonid. In 1986 Igor Krutoy finally managed to enter the Saratov Conservatory, the composer department. In parallel, his friend, popular singer Aleksander Serov, was winning international competitions with Igor Krutoy songs "Inspiration" and "In Fate's Despite". Krutoy was awarded the Lenin Komsomol Prize in 1989.

In 2012, Igor Krutoy became the chairman of Music1.ru and a shareholder of Net Element following a $2 million investment into the company. The joint venture culminated with the launch of www.Music1.ru, expected to become the online centerpiece of Krutoy's music enterprise and the online music market leader in the Commonwealth of Independent States (CIS) countries.

== Family ==
Born into a Jewish family, to Yakov Krutoy (1917–1980), who worked as a freight forwarder at "RADIODETAL" factory in Haivoron, and mother Svetlana (born 1934), who worked as laboratory specialist at sanitary and epidemiological station. His sister Alla Krutaya, is the author and host of Laskavo prosymo (Welcome, "Ласкаво просимо") show at TV company "Ukraine".

== Private life ==
- first spouse – Yelena Krutaya (born in Saint Petersburg)
  - son Nikolai Krutoy (born 1981)
- second spouse – Olga Krutaya (born 1963), since 1995. Olga Krutaya lives in New Jersey, United States, and is running a business there. Igor and Olga have one daughter together:
  - Aleksandra (born 2003).
  - step daughter Victoriya (born 1985), she is a singer, graduated from high school in New Jersey

== Composer ==
- When i close my eyes (Когда я закрываю глаза)
- A Sad Angel (Печальный Ангел)
- You are in my September (Ты в моем Сентябре)
- Blue Planet (Голубая планета)

Film soundtracks

- The Snow Queen (Снежная королева, 2003)
- Hostages of "The Devil" (Заложники «Дьявола», 1993)
- Thirst for Passion (Жажда страсти, 1991)
- Souvenir for the prosecutor (Сувенир для прокурора, 1989)

== Producer ==
- TV series "Star Factory" (Фабрика звезд) (2002–2007)

== Businesses ==
=== ARS records ===
Krutoy is head of ARS owns 25% of Muz-TV which plays Russian pop music videos. Since 2002, ARS also organizes the New Wave (competition) for young performers of popular music with Raimonds Pauls and Alla Pugacheva. As a management agency, ARS has signed artists such as Sopho Khalvashi.

=== Krutoy Media (formerly ARS Media) group ===
In November 1999, Krutoy founded the "ARS Media" holding. The group - which was renamed in 2012 as Krutoy Media - owns the radio networks Radio Dacha, Radio Shanson, Love Radio, Radio Russkiy Hit and Vostok FM as well as the Moscow-exclusive stations Taxi FM and First Sport Radio (a/k/a Pervoye Sportivnoye).

In January 2013, Krutoy sold 75% of the company's shares to oligarch Mikhail Gutseriev, keeping the 25% to himself.

== Recordings ==
- Album Madonna with Aleksander Serov, 1988.
- Album Ya plachu with Aleksander Serov, 1991.
- Album How Is It in Russia? with Rose Sisters, 1992.
- Album Ya Tuchi Razvedu Rukami with Irina Allegrova, 1996.
- Album Nezakonchenniy Roman with Irina Allegrova 1998.
- Album Odnazhdy v Amerike with Mikhail Shufutinsky, 1998.
- Album Latinsky kvartal with Laima Vaikule, 1998.
- Album Ti Eto Ya with Rose Sisters, 1998.
- Album The Rope Dancer with Valery Leontiev, 1999.
- Deja Vu, 2 CD+DVD with Dmitri Hvorostovsky, 2009.
- Album Mademoiselle Zhivago with Lara Fabian, 2010.
- Album Le Luce with Sumi Jo, 2012
- Album Romanza with Anna Netrebko and Yusif Eyvazov, 2017

== Titles and honors ==
- Honoured Art Worker of Russian Federation (1992)
- People's Artist of Russia (1996)
- People's Artist of Ukraine (2011)
- Lenin Komsomol Prize (1989)
- Order of Friendship (August 27, 2004)
- Order of Merit for the Fatherland of the 4th class (July 28, 2009)
- Order of Merit for the Fatherland of the 3rd class (July 21, 2014)
- Order of Friendship (Kazakhstan) of the 2nd class (July 3, 2019)
- Order of Merit for the Fatherland of the 2nd class (November 21, 2024)

== See also ==
- Russian pop music
