= Nora Bumbiere =

Latvian singer (1947–1994)

- Born: March 13, 1947; Jelgava, Latvia
- Died: January 12, 1994 (aged 47)
- Genres: Estrada, pop music
- Occupation: Singer
- Instrument: Vocals
- Labels: MicRec; Baltic Records Group; Melodiya
- Formerly of: Rīgas estrādes orķestris (Riga estrada orchestra); Modo; Sono; Tip Top
- Spouses: Aleksandrs Rezņičenko (married 1967–1972); Viktors Lapčenoks (married 1973–1980); Valērijs Beļinovs (married 1980–1987); Arsens Suleimanovs (married 1988)

Nora Bumbiere (March 13, 1947 - January 12, 1994) was a Latvian singer who became widely known in Latvia in the late 1960s. Born in Jelgava, she first rose to prominence through her collaboration with composer Raimonds Pauls and performances with the Rīgas Estrādes Orķestris (Riga estrada orchestra), and in the 1970s established herself as one of the leading voices of Latvian popular music as a solo artist and as part of the ensemble Modo alongside Viktors Lapčenoks. Her expressive voice and frequent concert appearances made her one of the most popular and influential Latvian vocalists of her time.

== Early life ==
Nora Bumbiere was born in Jelgava, Latvia on March 13, 1947. Her father, Jānis Bumbieris, was a chauffeur, while her mother Tamāra Domicella Bumbiere, was employed at the Jelgava hospital and later in a milk kitchen. She grew up with two sisters - Dace and Māra.

She attended Jelgavas 1. vidusskola (Jelgava 1st Secondary school) At age 17, she gave birth to her first son Romualds Bumbieris; therefore, she started studying at night school and began working as a ceramics decorator at the ceramics factory Latvijas Kerāmika (Latvia's Ceramics) in Jelgava.She polished her vocal skills at Jelgavas mūzikas vidusskola (Jelgava Music Secondary school) under the guidance of Valentīna Butāne.

== Career ==
When entering a competition in Riga with the ensemble Jaunība (Youth) in 1967, composer Raimonds Pauls, then artistic director of Rīgas estrādes orķestris (Riga estrada orchestra - REO), invited her to sing in the REO's women's ensemble, marking the beginning of her professional singing career. She sang her first solo part in the song Papu, saki mammai pats!, a duet performed with singer Ojārs Grinbergs. Bumbieres' and Grinbergs' performance of the song Cik klusa nakts by Pauls and Alberts Krūklis won third place in the 1970 Mikrofona aptauja contest. Her performance of the song Mūķenes un neticīgā was featured in the Latvian action comedy The Devil's Servants (Latvian: Vella kalpi) in 1970.

Soon after the singer Viktors Lapčenoks became a soloist at REO in 1971, he began singing duets with Bumbiere. Their debut song was Savāda vasara, which was included in the vinyl Teic, kur zeme tā (1971) by Pauls. The same year, Bumbiere, Lapčenoks, Margarita Vilcāne and Ojārs Grinbergs won 1st place in the Mikrofona aptauja contest for their performance of Teic, kur zeme tā; Lapčenoks and Bumbiere won 3rd place in the contest for their debut song Savāda vasara In 1973 Bumbiere and Lapčenoks joined Pauls' ensemble Modo as lead soloists. The group gained popularity in Latvian radio and television The pair won the Mikrofona aptauja contest in 1974 for the song Manai dzimtenei by Raimonds Pauls. The same year, their rendition of the song Laternu stundā was awarded with 4th place in the contest. Bumbiere and Lapčenoks recorded their first solo album Dzied Nora Bumbiere un Viktors Lapčenoks in 1975, which is also the year in which they dominated the Mikrofona aptauja contest, having won the first 3 places. Bumbiere won 1st with Ķiršu lietus by Zigmars Liepiņš and Alfrēds Krūklis; together with Lapčenoks they were awarded with 2nd place for the song Nakts dziesma by Pauls and Jānis Anerauds; and lastly 3rd place for Lauku gurķis Rīgas tirgū by Pauls and Jānis Pēters. The following year, Lapčenoks and Bumbiere won 1st place again with Mēmā dziesma by Pauls and Pēters. In 1977, Bumbiere got awarded with 1st place in the contest for Par pēdējo lapu also by Raimonds Pauls.

In 1978, following disagreements within the Rīgas Estrādes orķestris, Bumbiere left Modo; Viktors Lapčenoks also left shortly afterwards, though he later returns to the ensemble. The professional partnership between the two gradually ended, and the couple separated in 1980. Bumbiere continued performing with various musicians and ensembles, including collaborations with singer Žoržs Siksna, and in the 1980s she also performed with the groups Tip Top, Sono and Sandra un Harijs.

== Personal life and death ==
She married her first husband, Aleksandrs Rezņičenko, a sailor, in 1967. He adopted her first son, Romualds; their marriage lasted 5 years. Bumbiere married fellow singer Viktors Lapčenoks in 1973, with whom she formed a musical duet. The pair separated in 1980. The following year, Bumbiere married guitarist Valērijs Beļinovs; her second son, Georgs, was born in 1981.Their marriage was formally terminated in 1987, though Beļinovs emigrated from Latvia in 1982. She married stage worker Arsens Suleimanovs in 1988; their daughter, Beatrise, was born in 1990.

Bumbiere died from liver cirrhosis on January 12, 1994. Her funeral was held in Jelgava.

== Discography ==
Studio albums

- Dzied Nora Bumbiere un Viktors Lapčenoks (in collaboration with Viktors Lapčenoks); released by Melodiya , 1978

Compilation albums

- Labākās dziesmas part of the series Zelta kolekcija by Microphone records, 1995
- Nora Bumbiere by Baltic Records Group, 2003
- Nora Bumbiere part of the series Leģendas by Microphone records, 2010

Compilation albums with Viktors Lapčenoks

- Dueti 1 by Baltic Records Group, 2003
- Dueti 2 by Baltic Records Group, 2003

Appearances on albums by Raimonds Pauls

- Tev mana labā (1969) - Papu saki mammai pats! (with Ojārs Grinbergs)
- Raimonda Paula dziesmas ar Alfrēda Krūkļa vārdiem (1970) - Atvadas vasarai and Kāpēc?
- Tik dzintars vien (1970) - Cik klusa nakts (with Ojārs Grinbergs), Latgalei, Lietus lāses and Zib mūža rats
- Teic, kur zeme tā (1971) - Teic, kur zeme tā (with Margarita Vilcāne, Ojārs Grinbergs and Viktors Lapčenoks), Ar mani atkal runā kaijas (with Viktors Lapčenoks), Savāda vasara and Mūķenes un neticīgā
