= Edita Piekha discography =

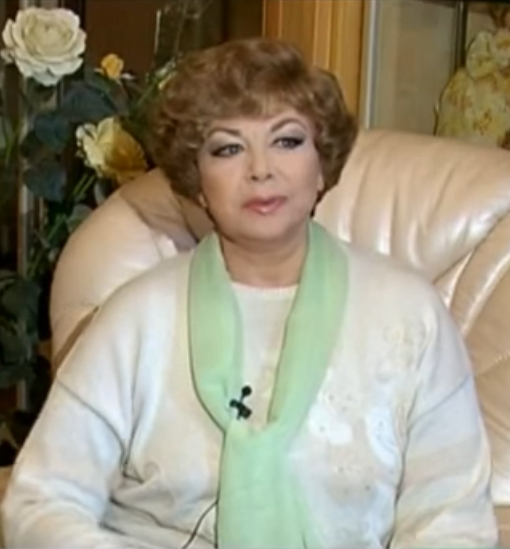
- Studio albums: 13
- EPs: 21
- Compilation albums: 8
- Singles: 3

Discography of the Russian singer of Edita Piekha, which let out 13 studio albums, 8 compilations, 21 extended plays, 3 singles.

== Albums ==
=== Studio albums ===
| Title | Album details | Certifications |
|---|---|---|
| Эдита Пьеха | Released: 1964; Label: Всесоюзная Студия Грамзаписи; Format: 10" | — |
| Ансамбль "Дружба" И Эдита (with Дружба) | Released: 1966; Label: Мелодия; Format: LP | — |
| Ансамбль «Дружба» И Эдита (with Дружба) | Released: 1967; Label: Мелодия; Format: LP | — |
| Эдита Пьеха И Ансамбль «Дружба» (with Дружба) | Released: 1972; Label: Мелодия; Format: LP | — |
| Эдита Пьеха | Released: 1974; Label: Мелодия; Format: LP | — |
| Эдита Пьеха | Released: 1980; Label: Мелодия; Format: Vinyl, LP | — |
| Ни Дня Без Песни | Released: 1981; Label: Мелодия; Format: Vinyl, LP | — |
| Улыбнитесь, Люди | Released: 1983; Label: Мелодия; Format: LP | — |
| Почувствуй, Догадайся, Позови | Released: 1986; Label: Мелодия; Format: LP | — |
| Моим Друзьям | Released: 1987; Label: Мелодия; Format: LP | — |
| Возвращайся К Началу | Released: 1989; Label: Мелодия; Format: Vinyl, LP | — |
| Я Вас Люблю | Released: 1994; Label: ЗеКо Рекордс; Format: Cassette | — |
| Никогда Любить Не Поздно | Released: 2000; Label: Self-released; Format: CD | — |
"—" denotes a recording that did not chart or was not released in that territory.

=== Extended plays ===
| Title | Album details | Certifications |
|---|---|---|
| Двадцать Крошечных Пальчиков / Мой Янек (with Дружба) | Released: 1958; Label: Апрелевский Завод; Format: 10" | — |
| Flier's Song / Autobus (с Дружба) | Released: 1958; Label: Апрелевский Завод; Format: 10" | — |
| Гитара Любви / Маленький Сапожник | Released: 1962; Label: Фабрика Пластмасс; Format: 10" | — |
| Стань Таким / Девчонка (с А. Золотов) | Released: 1962; Label: Апрелевский Завод; Format: 10" | — |
| Песня / Белые Ночи | Released: 1962; Label: Фабрика Пластмасс; Format: 10" | — |
| Венок Дуная | Released: 1963; Label: Мелодия; Format: 7" | — |
| Венок Дуная | Released: 1963; Label: Апрелевский Завод; Format: 8" | — |
| Караулы Влюбленных / Песня Остается С Человеком | Released: 1964; Label: Мелодия; Format: 10" | — |
| Мечта/Облака | Released: 1964; Label: Апрельский Завод; Format: 10" | — |
| Тик-Так / Жизнь Впереди | Released: 1964; Label: Мелодия; Format: 10" | — |
| Мама | Released: 1965; Label: Мелодия; Format: 7" | — |
| Наш Сосед / Воспоминание / Твой Отец / Я Иду И Пою | Released: 1967; Label: Мелодия; Format: Flexi-диск, 7" | — |
| Так Уж Бывает | Released: 1968; Label: Мелодия; Format: Flexi-диск, 7" | — |
| Про Любовь | Released: 1970; Label: Мелодия; Format: 7" | — |
| Разноцветные Кибитки | Released: 1971; Label: Мелодия; Format: Flexi-диск, 7" | — |
| Зачем Снятся Сны / Не Надо Молчать / Для Всех Людей / На Крыльях Ветра | Released: 1971; Label: Мелодия; Format: Flexi-disc, 7" | — |
| Поёт Эдита Пьеха | Released: 1974; Label: Мелодия; Format: 7" | — |
| Романс | Released: 1974; Label: Мелодия; Format: 7" | — |
| Прости Меня, Прости / Родник | Released: 1974; Label: Мелодия; Format: Flexi-disk, 7" | — |
| Говорите Мне О Любви (с Дружба) | Released: 1975; Label: Мелодия; Format: Vinyl, 7" | — |
| Песни На Стихи А. Ольгина | Released: 1976; Label: Мелодия; Format: Flexi-disk, 7" | — |

=== Compilation ===
| Title | Album details | Certifications |
|---|---|---|
| Edita Pjecha Und Das Drushba-Ensemble | Released: 1970; Label: AMIGA, Мелодия; Format: Vinyl, LP | — |
| Приди, Любовь, Приди | Released: 2000; Label: Парк Звёзд; Format: CD | — |
| Эдита Пьеха Часть 2 | Released: 2002; Label: Moroz Records; Format: Cassette | — |
| Grand Collection | Released: 2003; Label: Квадро-Диск, Moroz Records; Format: CD | — |
| Золотая Коллекция Ретро | Released: 2006; Label: Bomba Music; Format: CD | — |
| Город Детства | Released: 2007; Label: Bomba Music; Format: 2 × CD | — |
| Золотая Коллекция Ретро | Released: 2007; Label: Bomba Music; Format: 2 × CD | — |
| Любовь | Released: 2008; Label: Мелодия; Format: CD, Digipack | — |

=== Miscellaneous ===
| Title | Album details | Certifications |
|---|---|---|
| Красный Автобус / Старое Танго (with Братья Лепицкие) | Released: 1956; Label: Артель Химтруд; Format: 8" | — |
| Если Любит / Чайка | Released: 1957; Label: Производственный Комбинат У. Т. О. Днепропетровск, Производственный Комбинат У. Т. О. Днепропетровск; Format: 8" | — |
| Двадцать Крошечных Пальчиков (с Дружба) | Released: 1958; Label: Ленинградский Завод; Format: 8" | — |
| Каштаны / Автобус | Released: 1959; Label: Ташкентский Завод; Format: 8" | — |
| Так Легко / Дождик | Released: 1960; Label: Līgo; Format: 8" | — |
| Не Верю Я Песне / Упрямая Мелодия | Released: —; Label: Buitinės Chemijos Gaminių Gamykla (Kaunas); Format: 8" | — |

== Singles ==
| Title | Album details | Certifications |
|---|---|---|
| Белый Свет / Песня, Где Ты Живешь (with Тамара Миансарова) | Released: 1966; Label: Мелодия; Format: Flexi-disc, 7" | — |
| Белый Свет / Солнцем Опьяненный (with Муслим Магомаев) | Released: 1966; Label: Мелодия; Format: Flexi-disc, 7" | — |
| Великаны И Гномы / Человек Из Дома Вышел | Released: 1966; Label: Мелодия; Format: Flexi-disc, 7", White | — |
