= Makhmud Esambayev =

Soviet ballet dancer & actor

- Махьмуд Эсамбаев
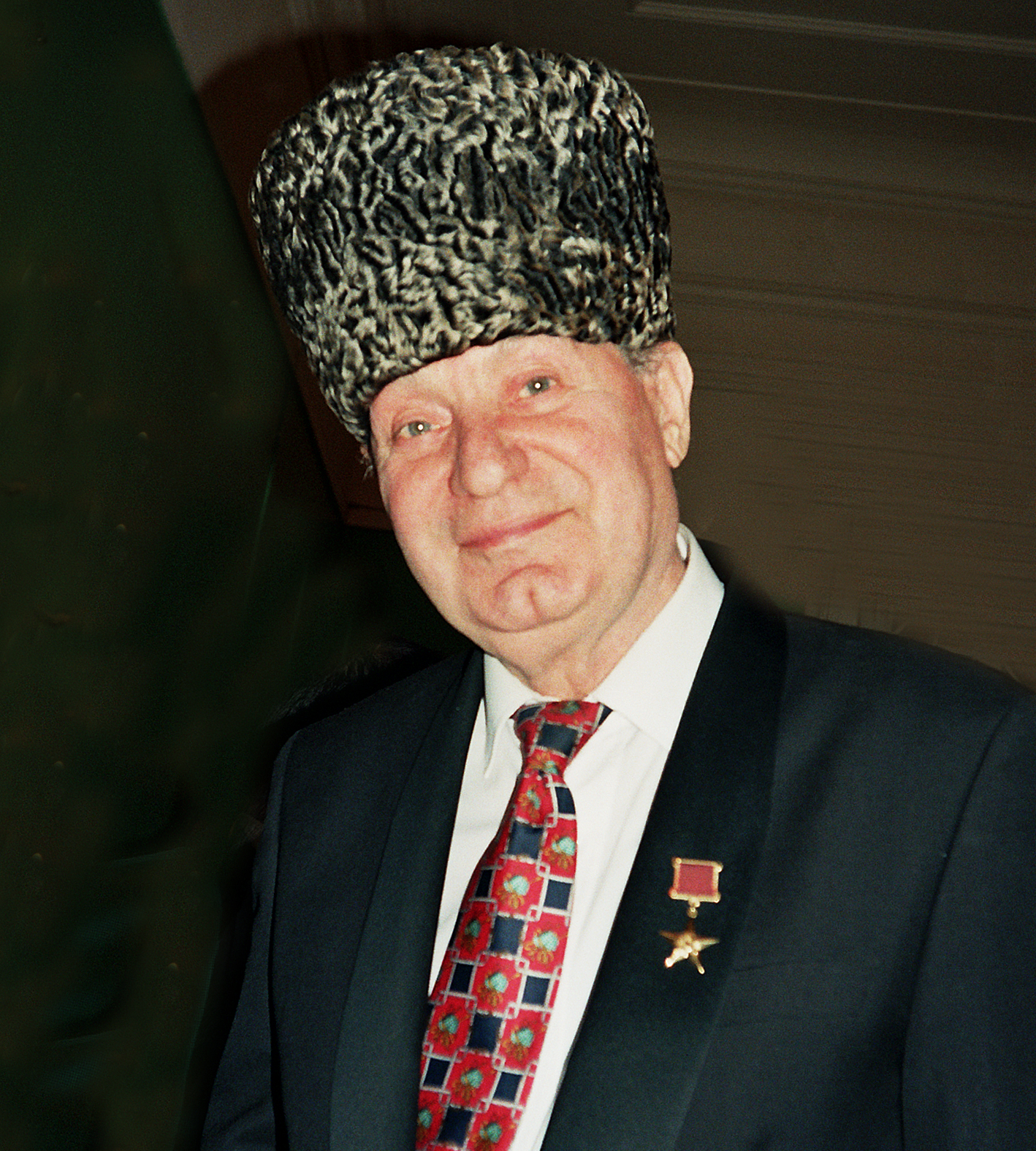
- Born: 15 July 1924; Starye Atagi, Russian SFSR, Soviet Union
- Died: 7 January 2000 (aged 75); Moscow, Russia
- Occupations: Dancer, ballet master, choreographer, actor

Makhmud Ḣelasoltiyn voḣ Esambayev (Note: Chechen: Махьмуд Ӏеласолтийн воӀ Эсамбаев, romanized: Makh’mud Ḣelasoltiĭn voḣ Ėsambaev; Russian: Махмуд Алисултанович Эсамбаев, romanized: Makhmud Alisultanovich Esambayev) (15 July 1924 – 7 January 2000) was a Soviet and Chechen dancer, ballet master, choreographer and actor. Makhmud was regarded as one of the most famous dancers of the Soviet Union. People's Artist of the USSR (1974) and Hero of Socialist Labour (1984).

== Biography ==
Makhmud was born in Starye Atagi, USSR to a Chechen family. When he was a child, his father would take him to village weddings where he would perform dances. At the age of fifteen, Makhmud joined the Checheno-Ingush Song and Dance Company, and at nineteen, he joined the operetta theater of Pyatigorsk, where he would give concerts to Red Army troops fighting in World War II.

In 1944, he was deported along with other Chechen people during the Deportation of the Chechens and Ingush, an ethnic cleansing of Chechen and Ingush people by the Soviet forces.

Years later, Makhmud joined the Kyrgyz Theater of Opera and Ballet as a soloist, where he played the lead role in productions of Swan Lake (playing the part of Von Rothbart), The Fountain of Bakhchisarai and The Sleeping Beauty.

After the rehabilitation of the Chechen people and gaining the right of return, Makhmud was elected more than once to the Supreme Soviet of the Checheno-Ingush ASSR, the Russian SFSR, and the Soviet Union.

Makhmud was known for always wearing his papakha hat, calling it "my crown" and not even removing it when meeting with a head of state. His papakha made an unparalleled and very conspicuous presence on the floor of the Soviet legislature. On noticing it, the Soviet leader Leonid Brezhnev would murmur that "Makhmud is here, it's time to call the session open."

He died of natural causes on 7 January 2000.

He was a recipient of the Hero of Socialist Labour and People's Artist of the USSR awards.

== Honours and awards ==
- Hero of Socialist Labour (13 July 1984) - for outstanding contributions to the development of Soviet choreography
- Order "For Merit to the Fatherland", 3rd class (15 July 1999) - for outstanding contribution to the art of dance
- Order of Friendship (20 July 1994) - for outstanding achievement in the arts of dance and productive social activities
- Order of the Patriotic War, 2nd class (11 March 1985)
- Honored Artist of the RSFSR (1957)
- People's Artist of the RSFSR (1966)
- People's Artist of the USSR (1974)
- A minor planet, 4195 Esambaev, is named after him
- The former "Central street" in Starye Atagi was renamed after Esambayev in 2011.
- Nairamdal Medal of the Mongolian People's Republic (1977)

Awards
Ovation
Preceded by 1996 Edita Piekha	Living Legend Award; 1998; Makhmud Esambayev	Succeeded by 1999 Valery Leontiev

== Filmography ==
- I Will Dance (1963)
- Swan Lake (1968)
- The Land of Sannikov (1973)
- Upright Magic (1975)
- At the World's Limit International (1974)
- Upright Magic (1975)
- Rip (1994)

== See also ==
- List of dancers
