= Krysha doma tvoyego =

Studio album by Yuri Antonov
- Released: 1983
- Recorded: 1979–1983
- Genre: Pop; soft-rock; disco
- Length: 40:10
- Language: Russian
- Label: Melodiya
- Producer: Yuri Antonov

Yuri Antonov chronology
Yuri Antonov (1979)	Krysha doma tvoyego (1983)	Pover v mechtu (1985)

Krysha doma tvoyego (Russian: Крыша дома твоего; transl. Your Home's Roof) is the second studio album by Russian singer-songwriter Yuri Antonov released in 1983 through Melodiya.

== Overview ==
The album includes songs recorded by Yuri Antonov with various musical ensembles, including Araks, in the period from 1979 to 1983 and several years earlier already released on EPs. All the songs of the album were written by Yuri Antonov based on poems by various lyricists. Most of the lyrics to the songs of the album were written by Leonid Fadeyev. The album also includes two songs based on poems by Mikhail Tanich and one song each based on poems by Oleg Zhukov, Viktor Dunin, Mikhail Vickers and Mikhail Plyatskovsky.

It was Antonov's first full-length album released in the Soviet Union. In 1979, he released his debut record in Yugoslavia through Jugoton. The record was an impressive success with listeners. So, at the end of 1983, he took third place in the list of the best albums of the year in the final poll of readers of the newspaper Moskovskij Komsomolets, and Antonov himself became the most popular male performer.

The main hit of the album was its title song, originally written by Antonov and Plyatkovsky for the children's musical cartoon Adventures of Kuzya the Grasshopper by Inessa Kovalevskaya, where the song was to be performed by Georgy Vitsin. The recording of the song was delayed due to Vitsin's employment on the set, and therefore the release of the song on Antonov's solo album in his performance took place earlier than in the cartoon. Performed by Yuri Antonov, the song has gained wide popularity. In 1983, the song was awarded a diploma at the Pesnya goda Festival, and was also recognized as the third most popular song of the year at the Zvukovaya dorozhka.

== Critical reception ==
In 2010, the album took 34th place in the Afisha magazine poll of the best Russian albums of all time, according to musicians from Russian youth groups.

Yuri Ovchinnikov mentioned the album in his retrospective review for Afisha in 2021, noting that it was the creative peak of the author and that in fact it was a collection of the author's best songs from the beginning of the decade, showing what soft rock in Russian could be. He also wrote that Antonov showed what a pop hitmaker of the new age can be, combining languishing love ballads and sentimental songs about the sea and the youth of hope, harmless but cheerful disco about memory. Summarizing, the reviewer stated that later Antonov could not surpass himself.

== Track listing ==
All music is composed by Yuri Antonov

Side A
No.	Title	Lyrics	Length
1.	"Zhizn"	Oleg zhukov	4:57
2.	"Vot tak byvayet"	Viktor Dyunin	3:40
3.	"More"	Leonid Fadeyev	2:40
4.	"Zerkalo"	Mikhail Tanich	3:33
5.	"Ya vspominayu"	Fadeyev	5:47
Total length:			20:37

Side B
No.	Title	Lyrics	Length
1.	"Dvadtsat let spustya"	Fadeyev	3:45
2.	"Ne zabyvay"	Tanich	3:50
3.	"Anastasiya"	Fadeyev	3:01
4.	"Zolotaya lestnitsa"	Mikhail Vikkers	2:45
5.	"Doroga k moryu"	Fadeyev	3:22
6.	"Krysha doma tvoyego"	Mikhail Plyatskovsky	2:50
Total length:			19:33

== Personnel ==
- Yuri Antonov – vocals
- Araks (A4, A5, B2–B4), Aerobus (A1–A3, B1, B5, B6) – musical accompaniment
- Sergey Teplov – sound engineering
- Sergey Borisov, Yuri Balashov – artwork
- Vladimir Ryzhikov – supervising

Credits are adapted from the album's liner notes.
