= Ojārs Grīnbergs =

Latvian musician and politician

- Born: 19 November 1942; Riga, Ostland
- Died: 22 April 2016 (aged 73); Riga, Latvia
- Occupation: singer
- Years active: 1961 – 2016

Ojārs Grīnbergs (19 November 1942 – 22 April 2016) was a Soviet and Latvian singer.

== Biography ==
Ojārs Grīnbergs was born on 19 November 1942 in Riga.

Since 1961, he was a soloist with various ensembles in Riga. During his military service in the Soviet Army, he was the founder and lead singer of the vocal and instrumental ensemble Zvyozdochka, which became the winner of the competition of "Liepaja Amber". He was a member of the Riga variety orchestra (1966–1974).

Since 1973, he sang in a duet with Margarita Vilcāne, both performers were soloists in the pop ensemble Latvian State Philharmonic, who bore the title of 1979 Tip Top.

He took part in the recording of the Raimonds Pauls studio albums Tev, mana labā (1969) and Tik dzintars vien (1970). He was the winner of the International Competition Rostock-72 Pop Song (1972).

He was a member of the party Tautas kustība Latvijai (1995–1996), deputy Saeima (1995–1998).

He was a Chevalier of the Order of the Three Stars.

=== Death ===
Ojārs Grīnbergs died in Riga on 22 April 2016 of lung cancer, aged 73.
