= Upright Magic =

- Russian: Честное волшебное
- Directed by: Yuri Pobedonostsev
- Starring: I. Fominskaya; Yuri Minin; Elena Sanaeva; Makhmud Esambayev; Tamara Sovchi
- Release date: 1975
- Country: Soviet Union
- Language: Russian

Upright Magic (Russian: Честное волшебное) is a 1975 Soviet family film directed by Yuri Pobedonostsev.

== Plot ==
The film tells about a girl named Marina, who was careless about any activity, saying: "And so it goes". And mother answered her that this was the name of the evil sorceress.

== Cast ==
- I. Fominskaya
- Yuri Minin
- Elena Sanaeva
- Makhmud Esambayev
- Tamara Sovchi
