= Valentīna Butāne =

Latvian folk singer

Valentīna Butāne (9 May 1929-14 March 2012) was a Latvian folk singer and vocal pedagogue at Jelgava Music High School. From 1956 to 1963, she recorded about 70 stage plays and participated in several radio recordings.

== Biography ==
Butāne was born on 9 May 1929 Daugavpils. She studied at Daugavpils Music High School. In 1952, she joined Latvian State Conservatory and in 1957 graduated from the vocal class. In April 1956, Butāne recorded for Raimonds Pauls the first concert song "Unsent Letter or Lyrical Song", later also "Puteņi jeb New Guardian Waltz" and others. In the same year, the song "Riga Boulevards" was released by Butāne's lyricist Elga Īgenberga. Also recorded Ringolds Ore's "Pie Lake" and other composers' songs. Butāne worked in Liepāja musical theater, where she staged major roles in operettas, as well as composing songs herself. She spent her last years living in Dobele with her son.

Butāne died on 14 March 2012 in Dobele, buried in the cemetery of Dobele Virka.
