= Edita Piekha =

Soviet and Russian singer and actress

- Эдита Пьеха
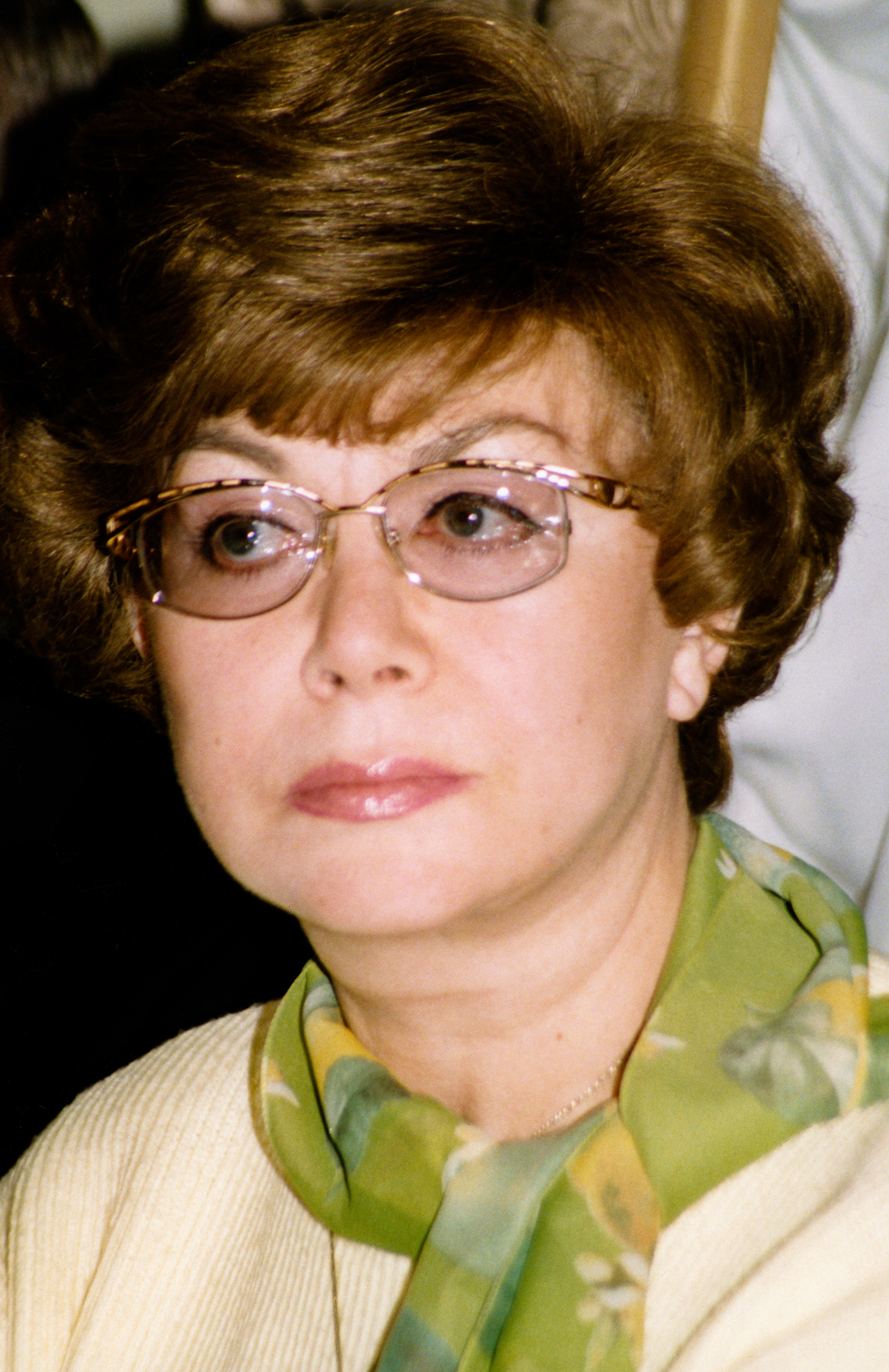
- Piekha in 1997
- Born: Édith-Marie Piecha; 31 July 1937 (age 89); Noyelles-sous-Lens, Pas-de-Calais, France
- Occupations: Singer, actress
- Years active: 1955–2021
- Label: Melodiya
- Title: People's Artist of the USSR (1988)
- Website: edyta.ru

Edita Stanislavovna Piekha (Note: In this name that follows Eastern Slavic naming customs, the patronymic is Stanislavovna and the family name is Piekha. In other relevant languages: Russian: Эди́та Станисла́вовна Пье́ха [ɪˈdʲitə stənʲɪsˈɫavəvnə ˈp⁽ʲ⁾jexə]; Polish: Edyta Maria Piecha [ɛˈdɘ.ta ˈma.rja ˈpjɛ.xa]; French: Édith-Marie Pierha [editmaʁi pjer.a]) (born 31 July 1937) is a Soviet and Russian singer and actress of Polish descent. The peak of her popularity in the countries of the former USSR was in the 1960s. Her most famous song is “Our Neighbor”. (Наш сосед) She was given the title Honorary Citizen of St. Petersburg.

In addition to Russia and Eastern European countries, she also performed in East Germany and other countries. Her first performance abroad was in Wrocław, Poland in 1966. In 1988 she was awarded the title of People's Artist of the USSR. In 1996, Piekha was named a living legend in the Ovation Award, along with such Russian pop icons as Alla Pugacheva and Valery Leontyev. However, not a single song of Piekha made it into the charts of the USSR or other countries. In 2016 she took part in the Rendezvous music festival in Jurmala.

Apart from singing, Piekha is a well known public activist for humanitarian causes, and is a supporter of orphanages in Russia.

== Life and career ==
Piekha was born in Noyelles-sous-Lens, France in 1937 to an ethnic Polish family. Her father was Stanisław Piecha, a mining worker from Upper Silesia, and her mother was Felicja Korolewska. Her father had died from silicosis when Edita was only 4 years old. As well as this she had an older brother named Paweł, who took over working in the mine after Stanisław's death. Paweł himself died aged 17; due to tuberculosis. From 1946 to 1955, Edita Piekha lived in Boguszów, Poland with her mother and stepfather Jan Gołąb, a communist, as well as her half brother Józef. There, she studied music, and sang with a choir and graduated from a pedagogical lyceum in Wałbrzych.

In 1955, Piekha moved to Leningrad to study psychology on a state scholarship. From 1955 to 1957, she attended A. A. Zhdanov Leningrad State University (now known as Saint Petersburg State University). At the University she had joined within a Polish choir with fellow Polish students. There, she met composer and pianist Aleksandr Bronevitsky. Together, they formed the first popular band in Russia, named Druzhba, and gave their first TV performance on New Year's Eve, 31 December 1955, with the Polish song "Autobus czerwony", which became a popular hit in the USSR.

In 1956, Piekha began studying singing and composition at the Leningrad Conservatory. In 1957, the ensemble Druzhba and Edita Piekha won Gold Medal and the First Prize at the 6th World Festival of Youth and Students in Moscow. There, Piekha made history with her performances of the popular hit "Moscow Nights", which she was able to sing in several languages to international audiences from 130 nations. In 1968, she won a gold medal at the IX World Festival of Youth and Students in Sofia with a song "Ogromnoe nebo" ("Vast Sky").

Piekha was especially popular among international audiences because of her ability to sing and speak in many languages, such as French, German, Polish and Russian, among others. As well as being the first Soviet artist to move freely around the stage talking to the audience and 'breaking away' from the microphone. After the 6th World Festival of Youth and Students, ensemble Druzhba and Piekha released several sold-out records of their songs, eventually becoming one of the most popular bands in the former Soviet Union. In 1972, Piekha and the ensemble Druzhba entertained international audiences at the XX summer Olympics in Munich. In 1976, she formed her own band, and remained one of the popular female singers in the USSR. She also continued performing internationally and toured over 20 countries. Over the years, Piekha made more than 30 concert tours in East Germany alone. Among the highlights of her career were her appearances at Carnegie Hall, New York and at the Paris Olympia.

During the 2000s (decade), Piekha gave several performances on Russian television. She also has been giving annual birthday performances in Saint Petersburg, a popular tradition she has been maintaining for many years.

Piekha has been residing in Saint Petersburg since 1955. Her daughter, Ilona Bronevitskaya, has been a popular singer and actress in Russia. Her grandson, actor and singer Stas Piekha, emerged as one of the winners of the Star Factory show in 2005.

On her 70th birthday, Piekha received an "Anniversary greeting" from the President of Russia, Vladimir Putin, and was decorated with the "Order of Merits" for her lifelong contribution to music and international cultural relations of Russia.

In 2012, British dance group Ultrabeat, recording under the name WTF!, remixed Piekha's "Nash Sosed" and called their version "Da Bop", which rose in the Dutch charts to No. 4, while in the same year "Nash Sosed" was also remixed into a song, "Party People", by DJs Gary Caos and Rico Bernasconi. French singer Daniele Vidal's French and Japanese renditions of "Nash Sosed" were popular in Japan in the 1970s.

Piekha got a star on the Moscow Star Square in 1998. Brooklyn band Svetlana and the Eastern Blokhedz has been paying tribute to Piekha, bringing her music to an American audience that was, until then, mostly unfamiliar with the singer.

== Discography ==
=== Studio albums ===
- 1964: Эдита Пьеха
- 1966: Ансамбль "Дружба" И Эдита (with Дружба)
- 1967: Ансамбль «Дружба» И Эдита (with Дружба)
- 1972: Эдита Пьеха И Ансамбль «Дружба» (with Дружба)
- 1974: Эдита Пьеха
- 1980: Эдита Пьеха
- 1981: Ни Дня Без Песни
- 1983: Улыбнитесь, Люди
- 1986: Почувствуй, Догадайся, Позови
- 1987: Моим Друзьям
- 1989: Возвращайся К Началу
- 1994: Я Вас Люблю
- 2000: Никогда Любить Не Поздно

== Filmography ==
- Secret Agent's Destiny (1970) as Josephine Claire
- Incorrigible Liar (1973) as herself (cameo appearance)
- Diamonds for the Dictatorship of the Proletariat (1975) as Lida Bosse (voiced by Svetlana Svetlichnaya)

== Recognition ==
- Order for contribution to Peace and Art (France)
- Honorable Diploma of the All-Russian competition of singers in Sochi (1976)
- Awarded the Nephrite Disc by recording label "Melodiya" as a bestselling recording artist.
- Honored Artist of the RSFSR (1968)
- People's Artist of the RSFSR (1976)
- People's Artist of the USSR (1988)
- Order "For Merit to the Fatherland";
  - 2nd class (31 July 2017) - for outstanding contribution to the development of domestic culture and many years of fruitful activity
  - 3rd class (10 August 2007) - for outstanding contribution to the development of musical art and many years of creative activity
  - 4th class (30 July 1997) - for outstanding contribution to the development of musical art
- Order of the Red Banner of Labour (1987)
- Order of Friendship of Peoples (1980)
- Medal "Soldier-Internationalist" (Afghanistan) - for concerts in Afghanistan and the soldiers in the hospitals, from 1979 to 1988.
- Gold Medal and Grand Prize of the 6th World Festival of Youth and Students in Moscow (1957)
- Three Gold Medals in the 9th World Festival of Youth and Students in Sofia (1968)
- Winner of the International Variety Competition in Berlin
- Winner of the "Ovation Award", the "Living Legend" National Award of Russia
- Main award of the international music fair in Cannes
- Personal Star on Star Square at the concert hall "Russia" in Moscow (1998)
- Winner of the Russian National Prize "Ovation" in the field of musical art in the "Masters" (2008)
- Gold Cross of Merit (2012)

Awards
Ovation
Preceded by 1995 Joseph Kobzon	Living Legend Award; 1996; Edita Piekha	Succeeded by 1998 Makhmud Esambayev

== See also ==
- Russian pop music
