= Mikrofona aptauja =

Latvian annual song competition

Mikrofons was the annual song contest took place in Latvia, in 1968–1994.

Latvian composer Raimonds Pauls composed several songs that participated in, and won, the contest. One of Pauls's winning songs, with lyrics by Leons Briedis, was the 1981 "Dāvāja Māriņa" performed by Aija Kukule and Līga Kreicberga. The song was later covered by many artists.
