= Incorrigible Liar =

- Directed by: Villen Azarov
- Written by: Yakov Kostykovskiy; Moris Slobodskiy
- Starring: Georgy Vitsin; Inna Makarova; Nikolai Prokopovich; Edita Piekha; Vladimir Etush
- Cinematography: Mark Dyatlov
- Music by: Yan Frenkel
- Production company: Mosfilm
- Release date: 1973
- Running time: 71 minutes
- Country: Soviet Union
- Language: Russian

Incorrigible Liar (Russian: Неисправимый лгун, romanized: Neispravimiy lgun) is a 1973 Soviet musical comedy film directed by Villen Azarov.

== Plot ==
Alexei Ivanovich Tyutyurin (Georgy Vitsin) is a very kind and gentle person who has been working as a hairdresser for twenty years. When there is an opportunity to be promoted to the salon's manager, he faces a problem - in the collective he has a reputation for being constantly late and being an incorrigible liar. According to his boss, Vasily Vasilievich Mymrikov (Nikolai Prokopovich), Tyutyurin has two drawbacks: "First, he lies, and secondly, he does not know how to lie," which is why he refuses to sign his recommendation letter.

But in fact Alexei does not deceive anyone - he actually does get into unusual situations on the way to work: he helps a boy to pick up his ball off the roadway, after which he is doused in water by an auto-dispenser, and Tyutyurin has to return home to change clothes; then returns a lost gold cigarette case to a foreign prince, in gratitude for which he arranges dinner in honor of Tyutyurin; then falls under a car driven by pop star Edita Piekha ...

After yet another delay Tyutyurin really does begin to compose a fable. He, with the help of Mymrikov, tells a "believable" story about a party with beauties and dances. The chief remains satisfied with Alexei's "corrected behavior" and decides to sign the character reference letter. But, tormented by remorse, Tyutyurin very quickly confesses that he lied, telling the true story about a girl, a ball and a fountain. Vasily Vasilyevich immediately becomes sure that Alexei is incorrigible and decides to take the most drastic measures. At this time, the prince's translator comes to the beauty salon with a gift for Tyutyurin, and a little later - Edita Piekha with Alexei's wife, and all misunderstandings are resolved.

== Cast ==
- Georgy Vitsin - Alexei Ivanovich Tyutyurin
- Inna Makarova - Zinaida Nikolaevna Tyutyurina
- Nikolai Prokopovich - Vasily Vasilievich Mymrikov
- Vladimir Etush - Prince Emir Burukhtan Second Second of Burukhtania
- Edita Piekha - cameo
- Emmanuel Geller - Rakhtan, the chief servant of the Prince of Burukhtania
- Boris Sichkin - translator
- Nikolai Pogodin - policeman at the embassy
- Nikolay Parfyonov - man in the park who offers to help out for the cigarette case
- Ivan Ryzhov - Senior Master
- Larisa Barabanova - Hairdresser Katya
- Valentina Berezutskaya
- Julia Tsoglin - hairdresser
- Valentina Khmara - hairdresser
- Larisa Vadko - Tyuturin's dance partner
- Galina Mikeladze
- Alexandra Dorokhina - Misha's mother
- Radner Muratov - waterer

== Songs ==
- Tak uzh byuvaet (Russian: «Так уж бывает», lit. 'It just happens') performed by Edita Piekha
- Pravda i vyumyusel (Russian: «Правда и вымысел», lit. 'Truth and fiction') performed by Georgy Vitsin
