= Vera Telenius =

Finnish singer (1912–1991)

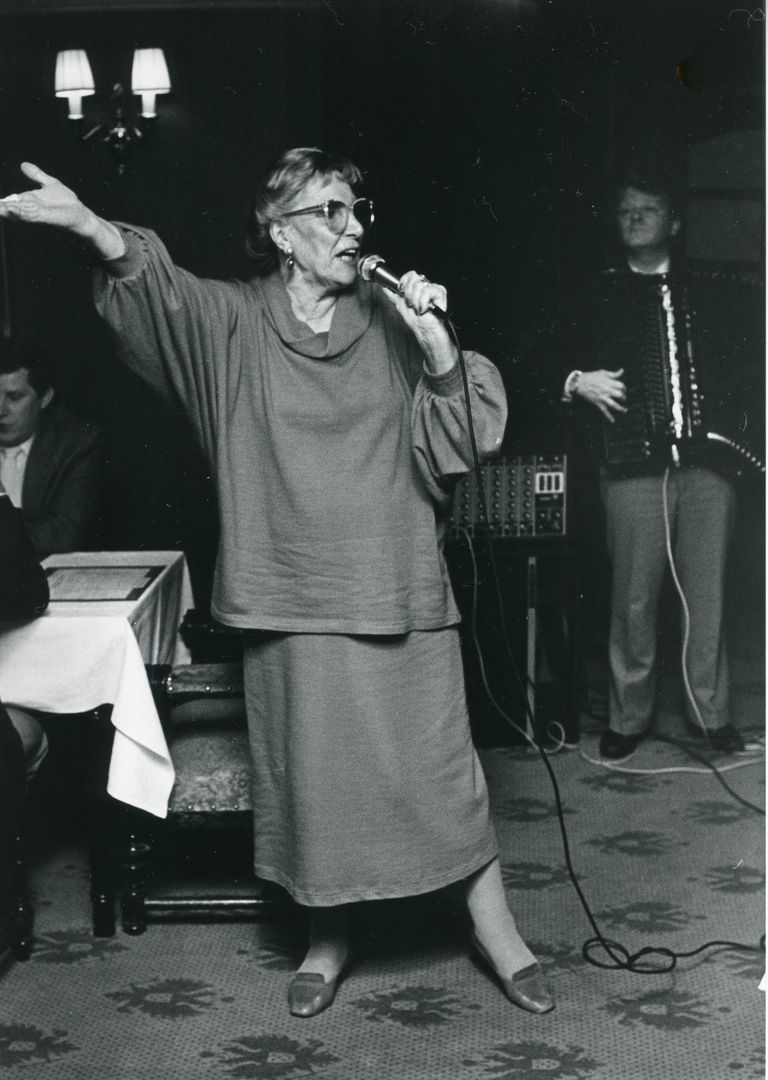
- Telenius in 1984
- Born: 24 September 1912; Sahalahti, Finland
- Died: 5 August 1991 (aged 78); Tampere, Finland
- Occupation: Singer

Vera Elisabeth Telenius (24 September 1912, in Sahalahti – 5 August 1991, in Tampere) was a Finnish singer. Her most successful recording was "Miljoona ruusua" for which she wrote Finnish lyrics for the song "Million alyh roz" originally made famous by Russian singer Alla Pugacheva.
