= Daniele Vidal =

French singer (born 1952)

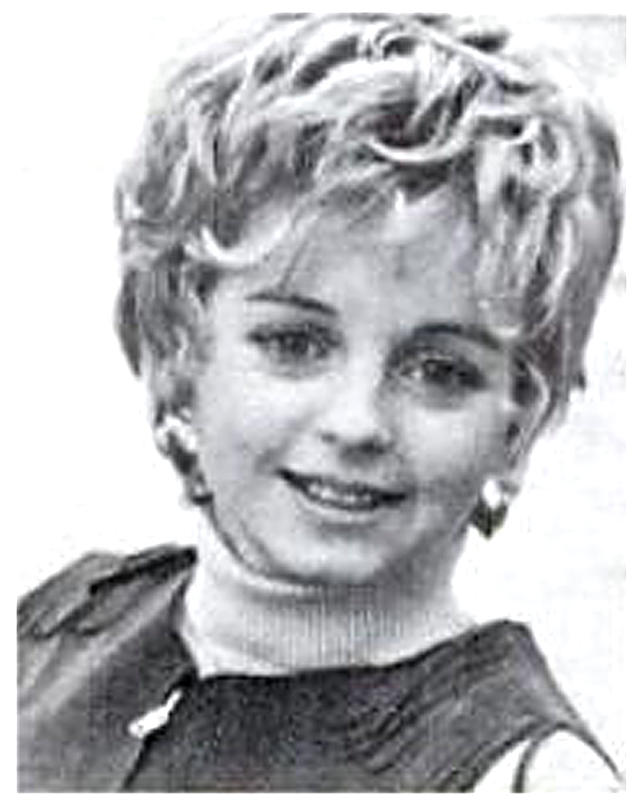
- Daniele Vidal in 1970

Background information
- Born: Danièle Vidal; 27 June 1952 (age 74); Morocco
- Origin: France
- Genres: Chanson
- Occupation: Singer
- Years active: 1969–1978

Danièle Vidal (born 27 June 1952) is a French singer. She is best known in Japan for her career in the early 1970s.

== Biography ==
Vidal was born in Morocco when it was a French colony. She debuted in 1969 at age seventeen with the record "Aime ceux qui t'aiment", a French-language cover of Edita Piekha's Russian song "Nash sosed" with different lyrics. "Aime ceux qui t'aiment" was released as "Tenshi no Rakugaki" in Japan.

Vidal released songs in French and Japanese. In the early 1970s she moved to Japan and lived there for several years. In 1980 Vidal married musician Shibata (Japanese name: 柴田功) of the Japanese group sounds band Chaco & Hell's Angel. They had one son and divorced. Vidal now lives in France. In 2018, she was called to Japan to sing for the Musée de la Chanson française [archive] and she received the prestigious Cerise prize for her entire career. In 2019 she met producer Yoshinaga, known as "Gitane", who offered her to record a record, with some of her old hits and new songs. The recording is done in Tokyo with jazz musicians and new arrangements for the titles "Les Champs-Élysées", "Aime those who love you", and two new releases "That's life" and "We two ". The disc also includes a duet with James Onoda, singer of the group Kome Kome Club, on Dalida's famous song "Paroles".

== Selected discography ==
- "Aime ceux qui t'aiment" / "Tenshi no Rakugaki" (Japanese title: 天使のらくがき)
- "Les Champs-Elysées"
- "Ciao bella ciao"
- "Pinocchio"
- Catherine (Japanese title: カトリーヌ)
