= Dāvāja Māriņa =

Latvian song

"Dāvāja Māriņa" (English: Māra gave) (Note: Māriņa is a diminutive form of Latvian goddess Māra.), or "Dāvāja Māriņa meitenei mūžiņu" (Māra gave the girl life), is a song written by Latvian composer Raimonds Pauls with lyrics by Leons Briedis. It was performed at the 1981 Mikrofona aptauja by Aija Kukule and Līga Kreicberga. It is one of Paul's most popular songs and has been covered by several artists, most notably Russian pop icon Alla Pugacheva in 1982 with lyrics by Andrei Voznesensky as "Million roz" (Russian: Миллион роз, "a million roses"), also widely known as "Million alykh roz" (Миллион алых роз, "a million scarlet roses"). Performed by Pugacheva, the song became an international hit in Europe and Asia; it was the most popular single in Finland, Japan and Mongolia. While the Latvian lyrics have a domestic theme of maternal comfort and life's hardships, the Russian version tells a dramatic story of a poor artist's unrequited love. It has been covered in a large number of languages, with title and lyrics overwhelmingly based on the Russian version.

== Alla Pugacheva version ==
"Million roz"

Single by Alla Pugacheva

from the album Akh, kak khochetsya zhit
- B-side: "Vozvrashcheniye"
- Released: December 1982
- Genre: Pop
- Length: 5:30
- Label: Melodiya
- Composer: Raimonds Pauls
- Lyricist: Andrei Voznesensky

Alla Pugacheva singles chronology
"Ya bolshe ne revnuyu" (1981)	"Million roz" (1982)	"Kanatokhodka" (1983)

Pugacheva's cover was written by Andrei Voznesensky, who drew inspiration for the Russian lyrics from the life of Georgian painter Niko Pirosmani who allegedly once filled with flowers a square of a hotel where Marguerite de Sèvres, a French actress he had affection for, was staying. The song is also the opening and title track of Pugacheva's album of the same name released in Japan in 1983.

Pugacheva herself did not like this song; even at the recording stage, she argued with Voznesensky about the lyrics of the song. She later admitted that the more she hated the song, the more popular it became.

In 2010, the song Million Roses from Pugacheva’s repertoire was included in the 10 best songs of the 20th century in Eastern Europe according to the popular TV program “Property of the Republic” on Channel One; in 2014, Pugacheva performed Million Roses along with her other hits at the music festival in Jurmala. Along with Pugacheva, the festival headliners in Jurmala were Ricky Martin, Il Volo, Ola, Alessandro Safina, and Lara Fabian.

=== Charts ===
Chart (1984)	Peak position
Finland (Suomen virallinen lista)	14

== Other covers ==
=== Recordings ===
Numerous further covers are lyrically based on Andrei Voznesensky lyrics (the cover by Alla Pugacheva):

- 1984: Finnish singer Vera Telenius (with Finnish lyrics by Telenius as "Miljoona ruusua")
- 1984: Finnish singer Katri Helena ("Miljoona ruusua")
- 1984: Finnish singer Pirjo Suojanen ("Miljoona ruusua")
- 1984: Hungarian singer Kata Csongrádi ("Millió rózsaszál")
- 1985: Swedish dansband Vikingarna as ("Millioner Röda Rosor" with Swedish lyrics by the Russian speaking Swedish journalist Jacob Dahlin)
- 1987: Japanese singer Tokiko Kato ("百万本のバラ", "Hyaku-man-bon no bara")
- 1987: Finnish/Swedish singer Arja Saijonmaa (with Swedish lyrics by Lars Huldén as "Miljoner rosor")
- 1988: Japanese singer Saki Kubota ("百万本のバラ", "Hyaku-man-bon no bara")
- 1988: Finnish band Santa Lucia ("Miljoona ruusua")
- 1991: North Korean Pochonbo Electronic Ensemble singer Kim Kwang Suk ("백만송이 장미")
- 1997: South Korean singer Shim Soobong ("백만송이 장미", "Baegmansong-i Jangmi")
- 1997: Russian singer Sergei Dikiy, member of the group "Lesopoval" ("Million alykh roz")
- 2000: Estonian singer Üllar Jörberg ("Miljon helepunast roosi")
- 2001: Latvian/German singer Larisa Mondrus ("Dāvāja Māriņa meitenei mūžiņu")
- 2003: Swedish singer Elena Ermanova ("Million alykh roz")
- 2006: Finnish singer Eero Aven ("Miljoona ruusua")
- 2006: Vietnamese singer Gia Huy ("Triệu Đoá Hoa Hồng")
- 2006: Latvian a cappella band Cosmos ("Million alykh roz")
- 2008: Iranian singer Farzaneh ("Gole Roz")
- 2009: Polish singer Magda Niewińska ("Milion Białych Róż")
- 2011: South Korean singer Kim Jong-hyun ("백만송이 장미")
- 2013: Ukrainian singer Ani Lorak ("Million alykh roz")
- 2013: French Orchestra Dominique Moisan ("Million de Roses")
- 2014: Vietnamese singer Hong Nhung ("Triệu Đoá Hoa Hồng")
- 2018: Russian singer Egor Kreed (Million alykh roz", with samples of this song, lyrics of was changed expect chorus)
- 2019: Japanese singer Kiyoshi Hikawa ("百万本のバラ", "Hyaku-man-bon no bara") (both 2007 television performance as broadcast and 2019 CD Shin - Enka Meikyoku Collection 9: Daijôbu/Mogami no Sendô)
- 2019: Cinemagic Studio from Ulaanbaatar, Mongolia created a performance of this song in Mongolian publishing it on Youtube. The lyrics, based on the Russian version, were written by Amgaa, the music mixed by Otgoo, and performed by singer Boloroo.
- 2020: Finnish duo Matti ja Teppo ("Miljoona ruusua")
- 2020: Latvian group Melo-M feat. Dināra Rudāne ("Dāvāja Māriņa"). The Georgian band Trio Mandili also covered the song.
- 2021: Assyrian singer Madlen Ishoeva ("Million Warde Smooqe")

=== Performances ===
- 2011: The song was performed live by Ance Krauze at an event celebrating Raimonds Pauls's 75th birthday.
- Korean band Infinity of Sound (Korean: 아이에스) (song title: "백만송이 장미").
