= Raimonds Pauls =

Latvian composer and piano player (born 1936)

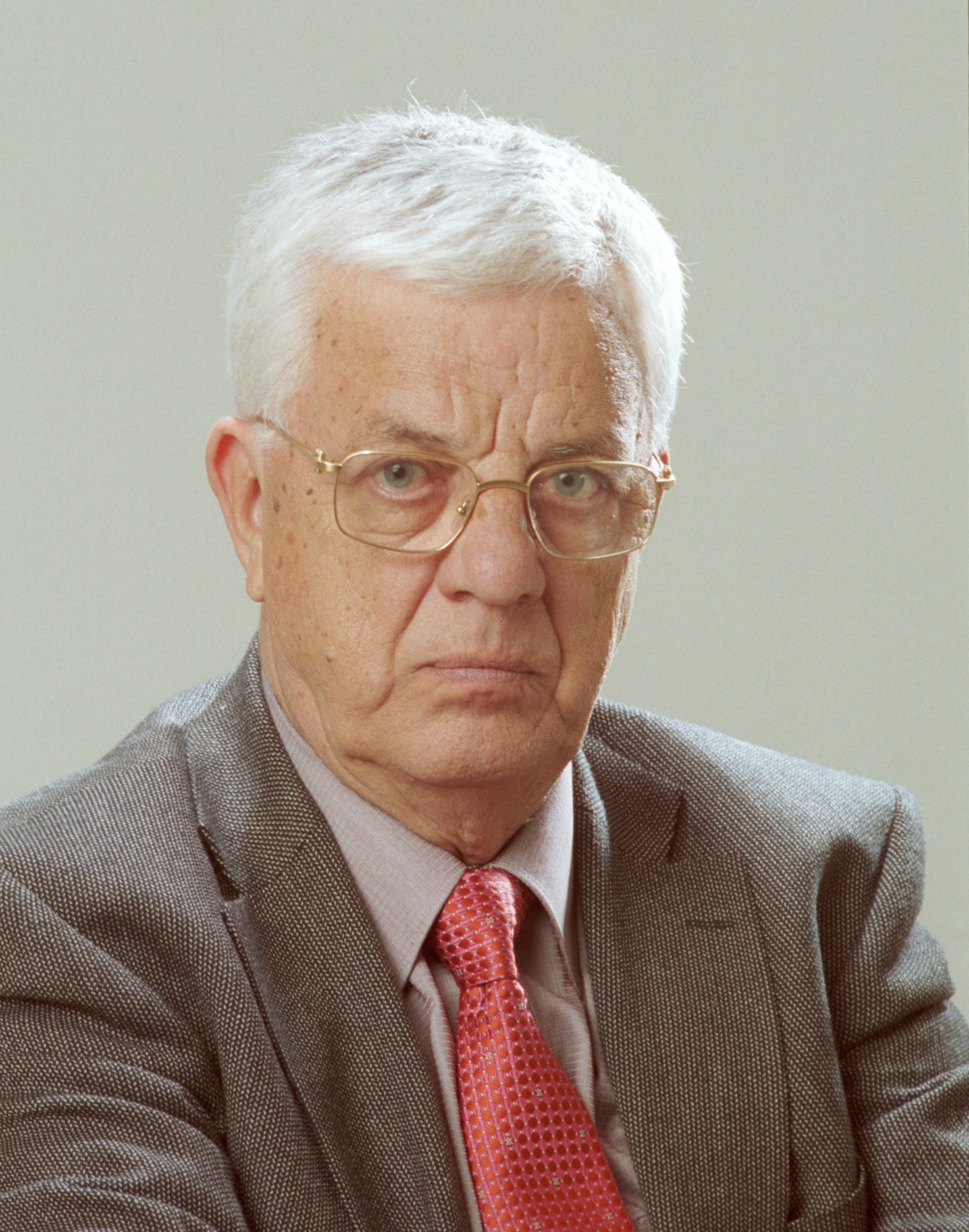
- Pauls in 2010
- Born: Ojārs Raimonds Pauls; 12 January 1936 (age 90); Rīga, Latvia
- Education: Latvian State Conservatory
- Occupations: Composer, pianist
- Years active: 1956-
- Notable work: Million Roses (1982)
- Title: People's Artist of the USSR (1985)
- Awards: Order of the Three Stars (Latvia, Grand Officer, Commander); Order of the Polar Star (Sweden, Knight 1st Class); Order of Honour (Russia); Cross of Recognition (Latvia); Order of Honour (Armenia); Order of the Rising Sun (Japan)

Ojārs Raimonds Pauls (born 12 January 1936) is a Latvian composer and a pianist who is well known in the Baltic countries and Eastern Europe. He was the Minister of Culture of Latvia from 1988 to 1993.

His songs were performed by such popular singers as Alla Pugacheva, Valery Leontyev, Laima Vaikule, Jaak Joala, Roza Rymbayeva, Svetlana Loboda, Nora Bumbiere, Viktors Lapčenoks and others.

== Biography ==
Raimonds Pauls is the second child of Iļģuciems' glass blowing factory worker Voldemārs Pauls and seamstress Alma Matilde Brodele. His father Voldemārs, began his career at the age of 15 years, when he joined his father (Raimonds Pauls' grandfather, Ādolfs Pauls) at the factory. Meanwhile, Voldemārs' mother, Aleksandra, respectively Raimonds' grandmother, hired an assistant at her shop – Alma. In 1932, Voldemārs and Alma celebrated their wedding. Unfortunately, their firstborn son, Gunārs Voldemārs died from meningitis at the age of four months.

As Raimonds' father has played drums and his grandfather – violin, Voldemārs decides that his son should also play a musical instrument. Equipped with an old violin, Raimonds got into Riga's Institute of Music kindergarten branch. As it was decided by the teachers that he was too young and "his fingers were unfit" for playing violin, Raimonds started with piano lessons.

In 1943, Raimonds began his studies at Riga's 7th Elementary school, while, in parallel, continuing to take piano lessons with the professor Valerijs Zosts and teachers Emma Eglīte and Juta Daugule.

In 1946, Raimonds was admitted to the Secondary Musical School of Emīls Dārziņš, combining his studies at the elementary school for three years. At the age of 14, Raimonds gained experience playing piano at restaurants and clubs with a violin and saxophone virtuoso, Gunārs Kušķis. In 1949, he finished his studies at Riga's 7th Elementary School. During this time, he independently developed a liking for playing jazz by studying and imitating various jazz records.

== Awards ==
"Maestro"

- August 1967 – Celebrated Servant of Art
- June 1976 – Artist of the People's Theatre of LSSR
- January 1985 – Artist of the People's Theatre of the USSR
- 24 November 1992 – Honorary member of the Latvian Academy of Sciences
- 1994 – Laureate of the Big Musical Award (for the poetic performance "Visi koki dieva doti" ('Every Tree You See By God is Given Thee'), the concert Svinga laiks ('It's Time for Swing') and the CD Ziemassvētkos ('In Christmas'))
- 12 April 1995 – decorated with the Order of the Three Stars (3rd class); thus, he is a commander of the Order of the Three Stars (for merits on behalf of the state of Latvia).
- 11 October 2008 – Cross of Recognition
- 2013 – Order of Honour (Armenia)
- 2020 – Order of the Rising Sun 3rd Class, Gold Rays with Neck Ribbon (Japan)
- 2025 – decorated with the Order of the Three Stars (1st class)

== Major works ==
=== Musicals ===
- Pāri, kas dabonas (Lovers Who Get It) (1976)
- Māsa Kerija (Sister Carrie) after the Theodore Dreiser novel (1978)
- Nāc pie puikām (Come to the Boys) (1982)
- Vella būšana (A Matter of the Devil) (1987)
- Meža gulbji (Forest Swans) (1995)
- Leģenda par Zaļo Jumpravu (The Legend of the Green Maiden) (2000)

=== Ballets ===
- Kubas melodijas (Melodies of Cuba) (1963)
- Ritmi, ritmi (Rhythms, Rhythms) (1979)
- Vitrāžas (Stained Glass Panels) (1979)

=== Theatre performances ===
30 theatre performances, including:

- Īsa pamācība mīlēšanā (A Short Instruction in Love)
- Atjautīgā aukle (The Ingenious Nanny)
- Šerloks Holmss (Sherlock Holmes)
- Brands (Brand)
- Džons Neilands (John Neiland)
- Elizabete – Anglijas karaliene (Elizabeth – Queen of England)
- Grāfs Monte Kristo (The Count of Monte Cristo)
- Dāmu paradīze (Paradise of Ladies)
- Melanholiskais valsis (The Melancholic Waltz)

Puppet shows:

- Runčuks Punčuks (The Belly Tomcat)
- Velniņi (The Two Imps)
- Ceturtais skriemelis (The Fourth Vertebra)

=== Films ===
Music for more than 30 movies, including:

- The Devil's Servants
- The Devil's Servants at the Devil's Mill (Vella kalpi Vella dzirnavās)
- Tauriņdeja (The Butterfly Dance)
- Melnā vēža spīlēs (In the Pincers of the Black Lobster)
- Double Trap (Dubultslazds)
- Dāvana vientuļai sievietei (A Present for a Lonely Woman)
- My Frivolous Friend (Mans draugs – nenopietns cilvēks)
- Theater (Teātris) after the novel by W. Somerset Maugham
- A Limousine the Colour of Midsummer's Eve
- The Mills of Fate (Likteņdzirnas)
- the Long Road in the Dunes series.

=== Choir music ===
- Three songs for choir and piano (1972)
- Ten arrangements of Latvian folk songs for boys' choir (1980)
- Song cycle with lyrics from Latvian poet Aspazija for boys' choir (1980)
- Baltās dziesmas (The White Songs) for boys' choir and instrumental ensemble (1981)
- Song cycle for choir and piano (1984)
- Vītola stabules dziesmas (Songs of a Willow Pipe) cycle for boys' choir (1984)
- Mazs, laimīgs zēns (A Small and Happy Boy) – ten songs for boys' choir and piano with the lyrics of M. Karēms (1985)
- Cycle Pērļu zvejnieks (Pearl Hunter) for boys’ choir and tenor (1986)

=== Cycles of light music songs ===
- Vecās Rīgas vitrāžas (The Stained Glass Panels of the Old Rīga) (1971)
- Five songs with the lyrics of D. Avotiņa (1972)
- Oriental motifs (1982)
- City romance (1983)
- Melnais kliedziens (The Black Cry) (1985)
- Cycle with lyrics by Rainis (1985)

=== Jazz ===
- Portreti (Portraits) suite (1962)
- A Rhapsody for piano and light music orchestra (1964)
- Iespaidi (Impressions) suite (1965)
- Dienvidu akvareļi suite (The Water-Colours of the South) (1965)
- Kalnu skices (Mountain Sketches) (1966)
- Five improvisations in the spirit of Latvian folk songs (1967)
- Melnās krāsas (Black Colours) suite (1967)
- Jazz expressions (1970) and other works

=== Instrumental music ===
- Approximately 300 works, including instrumental versions of songs, arrangements of folk songs, versions on familiar themes, and arrangements of classical composer works.
- More than 90 albums with songs and instrumental music (©MicRec/Daiga Mazvērsīte)

Music for radio performances and plays
Approximately 70 songs for children.

== Popular songs ==
- "Dāvāja Māriņa" by Aija Kukule (Russian: "Million Roses" ("Миллион алых роз") by Alla Pugacheva)
- "Starinnie chasi" ("Старинные часы") by Alla Pugacheva
- "Maestro" ("Маэстро") by Alla Pugacheva
- "Bez menya" ("Без меня") by Alla Pugacheva
- "Pesnya na bis" ("Песня на бис") by Alla Pugacheva
- "Vozvrashenie" ("Возвращение") by Alla Pugacheva
- "Delu vremya" ("Делу время") by Alla Pugacheva
- "Zeleni svet" ("Зелёный свет") by Valery Leontiev
- "Ischezli Solnechnie Dni" ("Исчезли солнечные дни") by Valery Leontiev
- "Kabare" ("Кабаре") by Valery Leontiev
- "Verooko" ("Верооко") by Valery Leontiev
- "Zatmenie serdca" ("Затмение сердца") by Valery Leontiev
- "Muse" ("Муза") by Valery Leontiev
- "Gody Stranstviy" ("Годы странствий") by Valery Leontiev
- "Posle Prazdnika" ("После праздника") by Valery Leontiev
- "Polybite Pianista" ("Полюбите пианиста") by Valery Leontiev or Andrei Mironov
- "Dazhe Esli Ti Uydesh'" ("Даже если ты уйдёшь") by Valery Leontiev
- "Tri minuti" ("Три минуты") by Valery Leontiev
- "Vernisazh" ("Вернисаж") by Valery Leontiev and Laima Vaikule
- "Yescho ne vecher" ("Ещё не вечер") by Laima Vaikule
- "Listja zholtyje" ("Листья Жёлтые") by Laima Vaikule
- "Scripach na krishe" ("Скрипач на крыше") by Laima Vaikule
- "Charli" ("Чарли") by Laima Vaikule
- "O chem igraet pianist" ("О чем играет пианист") by Laima Vaikule
- "Podberu muziku" ("Подберу музыку") by Jaak Joala
- "Ya tebya risuyu" ("Я тебя рисую") by Jaak Joala
- "Zilie lini" by Margarita Vilcāne and Ojārs Grīnbergs (Russian: "Siniy len" ("Синий лён") by Larisa Mondrus)
- "Lubov Nastala" ("Любовь настала") by Roza Rymbayeva
- "Tanez na barabane" ("Танец на барабане") by Nikolai Gnatyk
- "The Dog Rose" ("Mežrozīte") by Ojārs Grīnbergs
- "Say, where is this Land" ("Teic, kur zeme tā") by Margarita Vilcāne, Nora Bumbiere, Ojārs Grīnbergs and Viktors Lapčenoks
- "In the Lantern Hour" ("Laternu stundā") by Nora Bumbiere
- "To my Fatherland" ("Manai dzimtenei") by Nora Bumbiere and Viktors Lapčenoks (lyrics by Jānis Peters)

== Albums ==
- "To You, My Good One" ("Tev, mana labā") (1969)
- "Only the Amber" ("Tik dzintars vien") (1970)
- "Say, where is this Land" ("Teic, kur zeme tā") (1971)
- "Courland" ("Kurzeme") (1972)
- "Voice of the Sea" ("Jūras balss") (1974)
- "Don't forge Me in the Ring" ("Nekal mani gredzenā") (1975)
- "In the Lantern Hour" ("Laternu stundā") (1976)
- Dialogue, with Valery Leontiev (1984)
- Velvet season, with Valery Leontiev (1986).

== Politics ==
Raimonds Pauls was a member of the Supreme Soviet of the Latvian SSR and served as Minister of Culture in the Latvian government from 1988 to 1993. In 1993 he became an advisor to the President of Latvia. In 1998, he was elected a Member of the Saeima, the Latvian parliament, initially as leader of the New Party. Before the 2002 elections he joined the People's Party and was elected on its party list in 2002 and 2006. Pauls ran in the 1999 presidential election and received the highest number of votes, but below the required majority. He chose to decline the post.

After Latvia re-established independence, Pauls continued his musical work, most notably working with Dzeguzīte, the most popular children's group in Latvia at the time. In 1996, he went on a tour with singer Laima Vaikule, which included concert locations in Moscow, Saint Petersburg and New York City.

== Works ==
As of 2004, Pauls has composed music for six musical films and musical theaters, three ballets and over 50 movies and theater performances. CDs with Pauls' music have been released in several countries outside Latvia, including Russia, Finland, and Japan. In 2006 he recorded a double album of jazz music, My Favourite Melodies/So Many Stars – a long-awaited venture by the pianist into the jazz genre.
