= Valery Leontiev =

Russian singer and actor (born 1949)

- Валерий Леонтьев
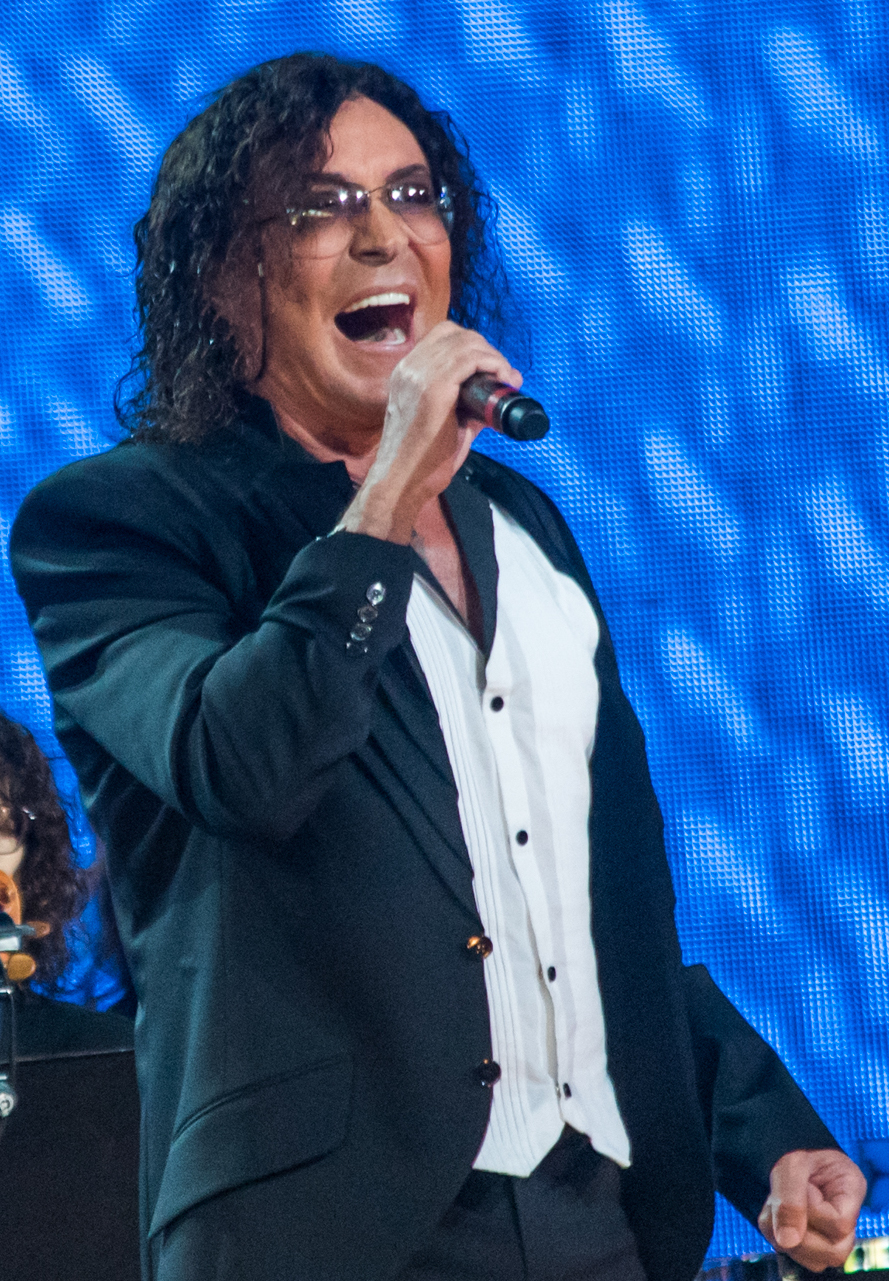
- Leontiev in 2017
- Born: 19 March 1949 (age 77); Ust-Usa, Komi ASSR, Russian SFSR, Soviet Union
- Education: Saint-Petersburg State University of Culture and Arts
- Occupations: Singer; songwriter; actor
- Years active: 1972–present
- Title: People's Artist of Russia (1996)
- Awards: Order "For Merit to the Fatherland" (Russia, 3rd, 4th class); Order of Honour (Russia, 2009); Order of Friendship (Russia,2014); World Music Awards (1991)
- Musical career
- Genres: Pop; Dance-pop; Rock
- Instrument: Vocals
- Website: leontiev.ru

Valery Yakovlevich Leontiev (Note: Also transliterated as Leontyev) (Russian: Валерий Яковлевич Леонтьев; born 19 March 1949) is a Russian singer, songwriter and actor, whose popularity peaked in the 1980s and 1990s. He was titled a People's Artist of Russia in 1996. During his career, he achieved international success in Eastern Europe, has the status of a pop icon along with Alla Pugacheva, and is a winner of ZD Awards.

In 1993, Leontyev headlined the Voice of Asia festival, along with Boney M and Gloria Gaynor.

Over the course of his decades-long career, he has recorded more than 30 albums, many of which sold millions of copies. The media refers to Leontiev as a megastar and a legend of the Russian pop.

== Early life ==
Valery Yakovlevich Leontiev was born on 19 March 1949, in Ust-Usa, a village in what is now Russia's Komi Republic. In 1961 the family moved to the city Yuryevets in Ivanovo Oblast.

== Musical career ==
Leontiev's first performance on the big stage took place in 1971, during the Vorkuta regional competition "Song-71". There, Leontiev took second place with the song "Carnaval".

In 1980 Leontiev sang in various concerts, including the Moscow Variety Theatre, Oktyabrsky and Luzhniki. In 1981, the artist won the popularity prize at the prestigious music festival Yerevan-81. American journalists who attended the event noted the expressive manner of performing of the singer and compared him to Mick Jagger. In 1982, Leontiev underwent a serious operation to remove a tumor from his throat, which jeopardized his further singing career.

In 1983, the singer moves to work in the Voroshilovgrad Philharmonic (now Luhansk Philharmonic) in the Ukrainian SSR. A year later, he was given a whole section in the author's evening "Holy love of music" by composer Raimond Pauls in Moscow.

In 1986 he performed in Chernobyl for the liquidators of the nuclear power plant accident. Alla Pugacheva also performed in Chernobyl. In 1987, Leontyev already became an Honored Artist of the Ukrainian SSR.

The beginning of the 90s was marked for Leontiev splash touring. His concerts were held in Germany, Israel, USA, Canada, India and other countries. In 1991 Leontiev was named the "Best Selling Soviet Artist" at the World Music Awards ceremony in Monte Carlo. In 1994 he performed on stage with Gina Lollobrigida in Saint-Petersburg concert hall "Oktyabrskiy", and in 1996 he was awarded the title People's Artist of Russia. in March 1998 а nominal star of Valery Leontiev was opened on the Star Square in Moscow. in 1999 Leontiev was awarded the "Living Legend Award" at the Russian national music award "Ovation".

In 2011 he was a member of the jury of Crimea Music Fest.

== On the stage ==
- 1972 – First solo concert was in Vorkuta.
- 1975 – Tour in USSR
- 1978 – Tour in Belarus
- 1980 – First concerts in Moscow
- 1981 – First solo concerts in Oktyabrskiy Big Concert Hall, Leningrad
- 1981 – First participation in the finale of the festival "Song of the Year "
- 1981 – participated in the competition – festival "Yerevan-81".
- 1982 – Tour in USSR
- 1983 – concert program, "I'm just a singer" (18 sold-out concerts in Leningrad)
- 1984 – concert program, "I run for life"
- 1985 – concert program, "Alone with all", which became a cult. Because queues for tickets on a few central streets of Leningrad stopped traffic. 10 concerts
- 1986 – concert program "Star story" Tour in Czechoslovakia.
- 1987 – concert program "Favorites", Tour in Bulgaria.
- 1988 June – 1989 November – rock opera "Giordano", more than 50 concerts in Moscow and Leningrad. Leontiev plays 3 main roles (out of 4!) – Giordano Bruno, a clown and Satan.
- 1988 – show "A matter of taste", tour in India
- 1988–1989 grand tour of cities of the USSR. For example, only one Novosibirsk in 1988 Leontiev gives a series of 27 recitals. and in Almaty 33 solo concerts.
- 1990 – show "It seems to me that I have not lived" in the Olympic Stadium. Concerts in USA, India, Germany, Israel
- 1991 – Tour in India, Canada, USA, Germany
- 1992 – Tour in Israel, Canada, USA
- 1993 – show "Full Moon" – first super-show in Russia
- 1994 – show "Beauty and Casanova" – the first concert of pop star with a symphony orchestra in Russia. With the participation of the sex symbol of the 1960 Gina Lollobrigida. Tour in Israel.
- 1996 – show "On the road to Hollywood", touring in the US, Germany, Israel, Canada
- 1998 – Concert on the Star Square, a solo concert at the 50 th anniversary of the State of Israel (Tel Aviv, 14 May 1998), a tour in Germany, the United States and the United Arab Emirates
- 1999 super-show "Photographer of Dreams", a tour to Russia, Ukraine, Israel, United States, Canada, Germany, Baltic states
- 2001 super-show "Unnamed Planet", a tour to Russia, Ukraine, Baltic States, United States, Germany.
- 2002 – concert in Atlantic City, Moscow, Kyiv, Tallinn, Riga, Vilnius, Minsk. Tour in Baltic states, Israel, Germany
- 2003 – concert tour of "The Sixth Life" (Russia, Ukraine, United States, Germany, Israel)
- 2004, concert in Los Angeles, 11–14 March – solo concerts in Oktyabrskiy Big Concert Hall.
- 2004, 12 March – The 300th solo concert in St. Petersburg.
- 2005 – concert program, "Valery Leontiev presents ..." (Russia, Ukraine, Belarus..)
- 2006–2008 – Tour to Russia, Ukraine, Belarus, Latvia, Kazakhstan, Uzbekistan, Kyrgyzstan, Azerbaijan, Israel
- 2009–2010 an anniversary show of "I love you, miss you, I'm waiting". Tour in Russia, Ukraine, Belarus, Latvia, Kazakhstan, Uzbekistan, Kyrgyzstan, Azerbaijan, USA., Israel, Australia, concert in Sydney, Melbourne.
- 2011 – 21–22 October – concert in the Kremlin Palace of Congresses (the show "The best ever!")
- 2012 – Tour with a concert program "The best ever!", dedicated to the 40th anniversary of creative activity (Russia, Ukraine, Сanada, USA);
- 2012 – 21–22 October – concert in the Kremlin Palace of Congresses (show "By popular demand ...")
- 2013 – Tour in Russia, Ukraine, Kazakhstan
- 2014 – 19, 21, 22 March – The anniversary concerts in the Oktyabrskiy Big Concert Hall, St. Petersburg; 28 March – the anniversary concert in the State Kremlin Palace, concert in Geneva, Israel
- 2015 – Creative Evening of Valery Leontiev in Sochi. Tour in Russia, Belarus, Kazakhstan, Germany.

== Musical prizes ==
=== Golden Orpheus ===
- 1980 – First prize of the XVI International Festival "Golden Orpheus" in Bulgaria

=== World Music Awards ===
- 1991 – "Best-selling soviet recording-artist of the year".

=== ZD Awards ===
- 1980 – Singer of the year
- 1984 – Singer of the year
- 1985 – Singer of the year
- 1986 – Singer of the year
- 1996 – Best show of the year – "On the road to Hollywood"
- 1999 – Best show of the year – "Photographer of Dreams"
- 2001 – Best show of the year – "Nameless Planet"
- 2009 – Special prize "Legend"
- 2014 – Special prize for a contribution to the development of Russian pop music

=== Ovation ===
- 1998 – "Living Legend"

=== Golden Gramophone Award ===
- 1997 – For song "One ticket" (Один билет)
- 1999 – For song "Everybody wants to love" (Каждый хочет любить)
- 2000 – For song "Augustine" (Августин)
- 2005 – Special prize "For contribution to the development of the Russian pop music"
- 2008 – For song "Dove" (Голуби)

=== Song of the year ===
- 1997 – Singer of the year and prize for a great contribution to the development of Russian pop music.

=== Muz-TV Awards ===
- 2003 – Special prize "For achievements in the development of popular music"

=== Russian Music Awards ===
- 2015 – Special prize for "a unique contribution to the development of the Russian pop music".
- 2019 – Special prize for "contribution to the development of national culture."

=== Others ===
- 1981 – Performer of the Year according to the contest, "Estrada-81" (Komsomolskaya Pravda)
- 1983 – Singer of the Year according to a poll of readers of the newspaper "Smena"
- 1987 – The best song of the year "White Crow" on the basis of open voting ITAR-TASS in the USSR, Poland, Czech Republic, Hungary and others.
- 1988 – Singer of the Year on the basis of open voting ITAR-TASS
- 1990 – Best song of the Year according to the All-Union charts TASS "Wicked Way" (Грешный путь)
- 1992 – Singer of the Year according to chart hit of the newspaper "Vechernyaya Moskva"
- 1992 – Song of the Year "At the gates of the Lord" (У ворот Господних) according to chart hit of the newspaper "Vechernyaya Moskva"
- 1998 – "Stopudoviy Hit" award from the radio station Hit FM for the song "Nine chrysanthemums" (Девять хризантем)
- 28 March 1998 – the inception of a star on the Star Square (Moscow).
- 1999 –"Stopudoviy Hit" award from the radio station Hit FM for the song "Everyone wants to love" (Каждый хочет любить)
- 2000 –"Stopudoviy Hit" award from the radio station Hit FM for the song "Augustine" (Августин)
- 2005 –Valery Leontiev listed in the Russian Encyclopedia.
- "God of the Ether 2009" in nomination "Radiorekord" (for the record number of rotations)

== Honours and awards ==
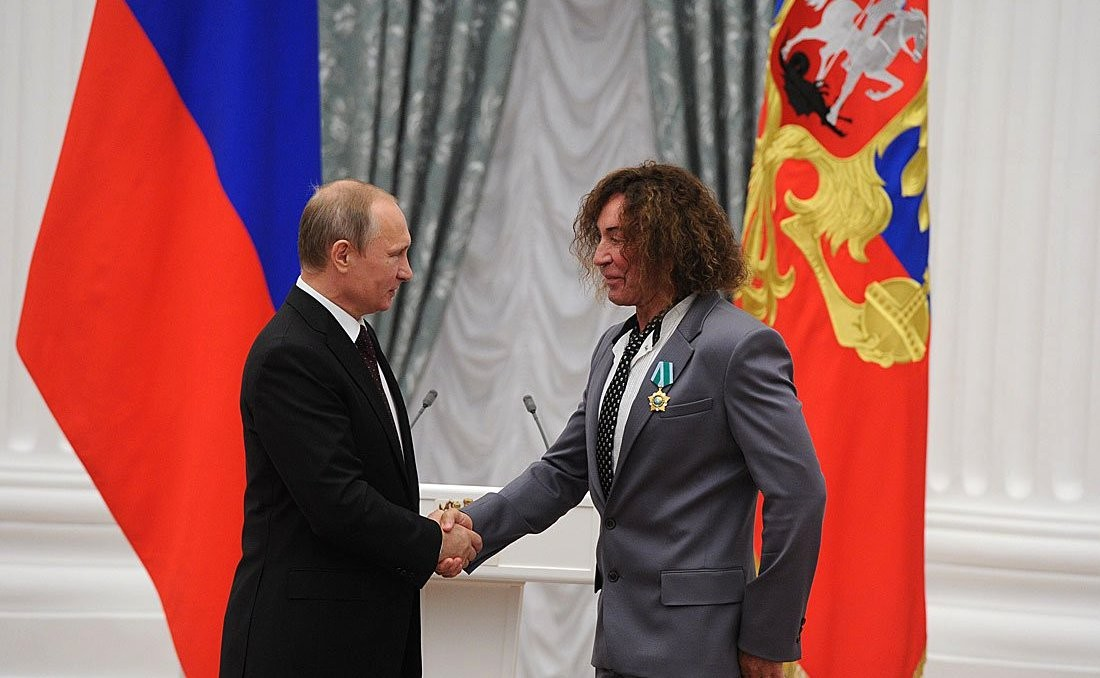
Leontiev receives the Order of Friendship from Russian president Vladimir Putin, 31 July 2014

External images
- Image Valery Leontiev receives the Order of Merit for the Fatherland 4th class from Vladimir Putin, 2005
- Image President of Belarus Alexander Lukashenko present Through Art – to Peace and Understanding award to Valery Leontiev in Slavianski Bazaar in Vitebsk, 2009

Orders

- Order of Merit for the Fatherland, 3rd class (21 February 2022) – for a great contribution to the development of national culture and art, many years of fruitful activity
- Order of Merit for the Fatherland, 4th class (19 March 2005) – for his great contribution to the development of music
- Order of Honor (2009) – for great contribution to the development of national music art and many years of creative activity
- Order of Friendship (2014)

Titles

- People's Artist of Russia (9 March 1996)
- Merited Artist of Ukrainian SSR (1987)
- People's Artist of the Republic of Komi (2009)
- Honorary Citizen of Sakha Republic (2014)

Medals

- Medal "For Faith and Good" (2010)

Awards

- Lenin Komsomol Prize (1985) – for the promotion of Soviet pop songs of youth and high performance skills
- Prize of the Moscow Government in the field of literature and the arts (1996) – for the super show "Full Moon" and "On the way to Hollywood"
- Prize of the Ministry of Internal Affairs of Russia in the field of literature and the arts (1999)
- Belarus president award Through Art – to Peace and Understanding presented by Alexander Lukashenko on 12 July 2009

Public awards

- Order of Mikhail Lomonosov (2007)
- Order "For the rebirth of Russia. 21st Century" (2003)

Awards
Golden Orpheus
Preceded by 1979 Sarolta Zalatnay	First Prize; 1980; Valery Leontiev	Succeeded by 1981 Vasil Naydenov
World Music Awards
Preceded by 1989 Vladimir Presnyakov	Best-Selling Soviet Artist; 1991; Valery Leontiev	Succeeded by 1992 Oleg Gazmanov
Ovation
Preceded by 1998 Makhmud Esambayev	Living Legend Award; 1999; Valery Leontiev	Succeeded by 2000 Yuri Antonov
Muz-TV Music Awards
Preceded by	Contribution to pop music development 2003; Valery Leontiev	Succeeded by 2004 Sofia Rotaru
Slavianski Bazaar
Preceded by 2008 Aleksandra Pakhmutova	Through Art – to Peace and Understanding; 2009; Valery Leontiev	Succeeded by 2009 Vladimir Mulyavin and Pesniary

== Discography ==
See Valery Leontiev discography

=== Studio albums ===
Year (P)	Number	Original title	Title in English	Format	Label, country
1983	С60—19873-4	Муза	Muse	LP	Melodiya, USSR
1984	С60—21271-2	Диалог	Dialogue	LP	Melodiya, USSR
1984	С60—21545-6	Премьера	Premiere	LP	Melodiya, USSR
1986	С60—23753-4	Дискоклуб 16(Б)	Disco club 16 B	LP	Melodiya, USSR
1986	С60—24623-4	Бархатный сезон	Velvet season	LP	Melodiya, USSR
1988	С60—26737-8	Я – просто певец	I am – just a singer	LP	Melodiya, USSR
1990	С60 30317 006	Дело вкуса	A matter of taste	LP, CD	Melodiya, USSR
1990	С60—30317-8	Грешный путь	Wicked Way	LP, CD	Melodiya, USSR
1993	SNCD – 3013	Ночь	Night	LP, CD	SNC records, Russia
1993	R90 02179-80	Полнолуние	Full Moon	LP, CD	Аprelevka Sound Inc, Russia
1994	R90 01913	У ворот Господних	At the gate of the Lord	LP	Aprelevka Sound, Russia
1995	AXMC 3-0038	По дороге в Голливуд	On the road to Hollywood	CD	APEX Records, Russia
1998	AXCD5-0054	Санта-Барбара	Santa Barbara	CD	DANA Music, Russia
1999	АРС027-99	Канатный плясун	Rope-Dancer	CD	АРС Records, Russia
1999	VL042/99-2	Каждый хочет любить	Everyone wants to love	CD	VL-Studio, Russia
2001	VL043/01-2	Августин	Augustine	CD	VL-Studio, Russia
2003	VL 045-02	Кленовый лист	Maple Leaf	CD	VL-Studio, Russia
2004	GR CD – 387	Ночной звонок	Night Call	CD	Grand Records, Russia
2005	GR CD – 433	Падаю в небеса	I fall into the heavens	CD	Grand Records, Russia
2009	МТ 1000294-230-1	Годы странствий	The years of wandering	CD	Monolit Records, Russia
2011	МТ 000410-738-1	Художник	Painter	CD	Monolit Records, Russia
2014	МТ 001091-383-1	Любовь-капкан	Love-Trap	CD	Monolit Records, Russia
2017		Это любовь	This is Love	CD	Gamma Music, Russia
2019		Я вернусь	I'll Be Back	CD	

== Songwriting credits ==
=== As composer ===
All songs composed with Yuri Varum.

- 1985: Mongolia (Монголия)
- 1985: Flower Seller (Продавец цветов) (Remake released in 2014)
- 1986: Remember them Flying (Запомни их летящими)
- 1986: Game № 1 (Игра No. 1)
- 1986: Fires (Костры)
- 1987: Dog Show (Выставка собак)
- 1987: Familiar Fairy Tale (Знакомая сказка)
- 1987: Kukaracha (Кукарача)
- 1987: Skyscrapers (Небоскрёбы)
- 1987: I Don't Like (Я не люблю)
- 1988: I Went to the Microphone (Я вышел к микрофону)

=== As lyricist ===
- 1985: Birth Day (Рождение дня) (Lyrics co-written with Vladimir Kostrov)
- 1993: Touch (Прикоснись) (Lyrics co-written with Nikolai Denisov)

== Filmography ==
- 1981: In a strange feast (На чужом празднике)
- 1985: Do Not Marry, Girls (Не ходите, девки, замуж)
- 1985: Insurance agent (Страховой агент)
- 1992: Psychic (Экстрасенс)

== Musical films and musicals ==
- 1979: Crimean Dawns (Крымские зори)
- 1979: The film-concert "Olümpiaregati tähed \ Stars Olympic regatta" CT USSR and ETV
- 1984: I do not say goodbye to you ( Я с тобой не прощаюсь)
- 1984: Winds Baltic ETV
- 1985: Stained glass maker (Витражных дел мастер)
- 1986: Clown with autumn in the heart (Клоун с осенью в сердце)
- 1986: How to become a star (Как стать звездой)
- 1987: Valery Leontiev (film)
- 1990: Valery Leontiev. Let me go with you (Валерий Леонтьев. Дай мне уйти с тобой)
- 1991: Valery Leontiev Sings ( Поёт Валерий Леонтьев)
- 1991: Valery Leontiev. Made in India (Валерий Леонтьев. Made in India)
- 1997: Saturday evening with Valery Leontiev (Musical film RTR)
- 1997: Such different Valery Leontiev (Такой разный Валерий Леонтьев)
- 1997: Parade parade is Valery Leontiev (Парад парадов представляет Валерий Леонтьев) movie channel TV-6
- 2000: The reverse side of Valery Leontiev (Обратная сторона Валерия Леонтьева) movie channel ORT
- 2002: Cinderella (Musical film)
- 2003: Three tunes for the film Valery Leontiev (Три мелодии для фильма Валерия Леонтьева)
- 2009: Valery Leontiev in Komi (Валерий Леонтьев в Коми)
- 2009: I have not lived. Valery Leontiev (— Я ещё не жил. Валерий Леонтьев) movie channel ORT
- 2009: Valery Leontiev: Lost laughter (Валерий Леонтьев: Утерянный смех) movie channel Inter
- 2009: Benefit Valery Leontiev "The Book of Fate" (Бенефис Валерия Леонтьева "Книга судьбы") movie channel NTV
- 2012: Anniversary concert of Valery Leontiev "The best ever!" (Юбилейный концерт Валерия Леонтьева "Лучший навсегда!") concert channelORT
- 2012: "Hurtling time if a rider" ("Мчится время будто всадник") movie channel TV Tsentr

== Personal life ==
Valery Leontiev is married to bass guitarist Lyudmila Isakovich. The couple have been together since 1972. However, officially their marriage was registered only in 1998. The artist's wife lives in Miami.

== Eurovision Song Contest 1987 ==
The Soviet Union never participated in the Eurovision Song Contest, as no Soviet broadcasters were members of the EBU. In 2009 Eduard Fomin, a former employee of the Ministry of Education of the RSFSR, revealed that in 1987 George Veselov, the Minister of Education for the Soviet Union, brought forward the idea of Soviet participation in the EBU and the Eurovision Song Contest due to the number of political reforms made by the Soviet General Secretary Mikhail Gorbachev during the late 1980s. The idea was mainly a political one, with the thought that a win in the contest for the Soviet Union would impact on the relationships between the Soviet Union and the capitalist countries of the west. Valery Leontiev was suggested as a singer for the Soviet Union's first entry into the contest, but Veselov's ideas were not shared by the Communist Party of the Soviet Union, or by Gorbachev himself, believing it to be too radical a step to take, and so the Soviet Union never entered the contest before dissolving.

== Statements about Leontiev ==
- President Vladimir Putin: "You rightly recognized master of song genre, artist who reached the summits of Pop Olympus thanks to genuine talent, professionalism and hard work."
- President Dmitry Medvedev: "Over the years, the bright stage career, you not only have gained a great love of fans, but also sets a high standard of music for the new generations of artists. The songs performed by you, always lead not only in the charts, but also in the hearts of an audience of millions."
- President Alexander Lukashenko: "Great talent, unparalleled professional skills and constant creative search brought you a well-deserved fame and recognition around the world."
- Politician Valentina Matviyenko: "You have created a stage persona which has never been on the stage and I am sure that nobody will never repeat, and you follow this image."
- Singer Muslim Magomayev: "Name Valery Leontiev enough just to name – and do not have any colorful definitions! Everything is clear! Living Classic of our stage."
- Singer Joseph Kobzon: "Tragically, we have a unit of this magnitude stars – Pugacheva, Leontiev ... Those people who for many years retain their creative person and love of the public."

== Real estate ==
- 3 storey apartment in Kolokolnikov Lane, Meshchansky District, Moscow. Purchased in 1993.
- Villa in Sunny Isles Beach, Florida, USA. Purchased in 1996
- Apartment on Collins Avenue, Miami, FL, USA. Purchased in 2002.
- Apartment in Hallandale Beach, Florida, USA. Purchased in 2005
- Villa in Alicante, Spain (neighbors – Mikhail Gorbachev, Victoria Beckham). Purchased in 2008

== See also ==
- Russian pop music
