= Ovation (award) =

Russian music award

Ovation awards
- Awarded for: Achievements in the music industry
- Country: Russia
- First award: 1991–present
- Website: Official website

Ovation is a Russian national music award in the field of entertainment and popular music. Along with ZD Awards, it is one of the major mainstream music awards in Russia, with other awards in the Russian entertainment industry, such as Nika Award. The Ovation Award covers all genres, including classical music, folk music, rock and pop music, jazz, and musical theater.

The first Ovation ceremony was held in 1992, initiated by businessman Grigory Kuznetsov. The awards can be compared to American Grammy Awards and British Brit Awards.

Among the award winners are such pop icons of Russia and Eastern Europe as Alla Pugacheva and Valery Leontyev, as well as famous rock performers such as Bi-2 and Andrey Makarevich. In 2002, Vitas was named best singer, and the hit of the year was the single “Not Gonna Get Us” by t.A.T.u. The only international artists to have received the Ovation Award were Michael Jackson in 1994 and Natalia Oreiro in 2002, who received awards in the category of best concert tour.

The awards ceremony, whose trophy is a pair of applauding hands, was held in various concert halls in Moscow or St. Petersburg. Initially, the winners were to be determined by the audience: anyone could buy a special card, fill it out and send it to the organizers. However, this method was only used to determine the winners at the first ceremony in 1992. At all subsequent Ovation events, the winners were determined by a special jury - the Higher Academic Commission, consisting of show business figures, journalists and various artists. "Ovation" trophies are awarded in several dozen categories, including "Soloist of the Year", "Composer of the Year", "Best Rhythm and blues Album", "Best Vocal Debut of the Year", etc. Additionally, there are various special prizes, such as "Living Legend" or the award for a major contribution to the development of the national culture. The prize has been awarded every year except 1993 and 2003–2007. The last time the award ceremony took place was in 2016.

== Living Legend Award ==
- 1994 — Alla Pugacheva
- 1995 — Joseph Kobzon
- 1996 — Edita Piekha
- 1998 — Makhmud Esambayev
- 1999 — Valery Leontiev
- 2000 — Yuri Antonov
- 2001 — Igor Moiseyev
- 2002 — Aleksandra Pakhmutova
- 2003-2007 was not awarded
- 2008 — Mstislav Rostropovich, Muslim Magomayev, Maria Mulyash
- 2009-2015 was not awarded
- 2016 — Alexander Zhurbin
- 2017-2024 was not awarded
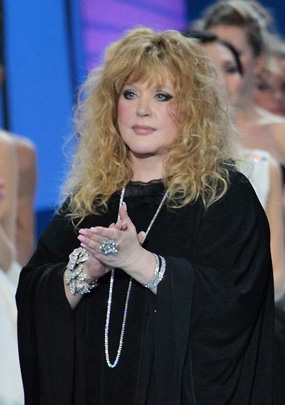
Alla Pugacheva, Pop singer.

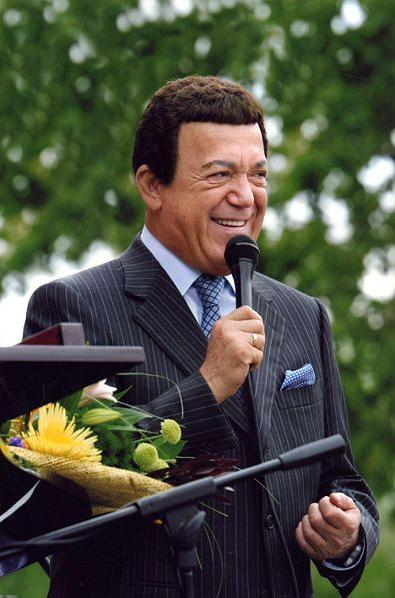
Joseph Kobzon, Pop singer.

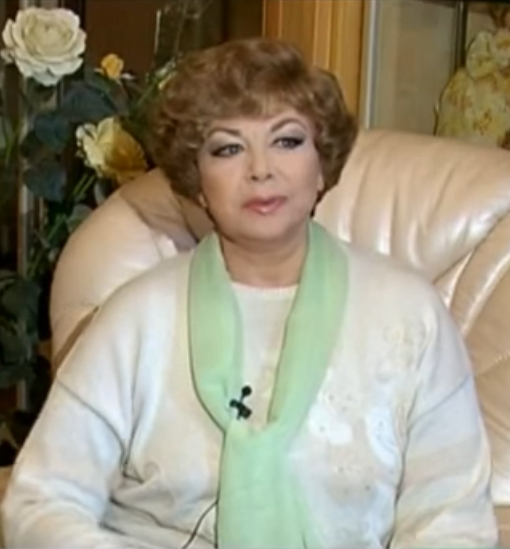
Edita Piekha, Pop singer.

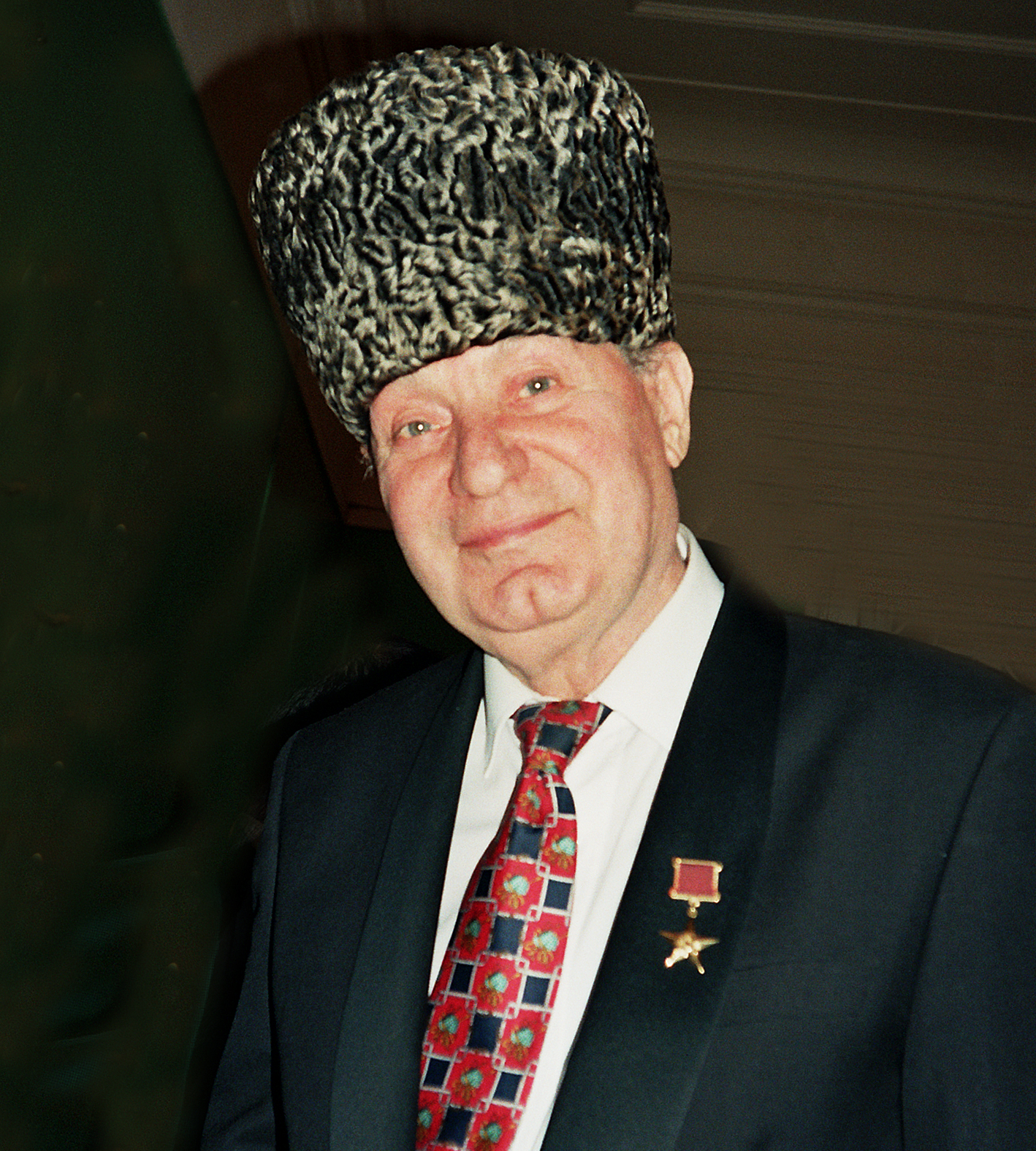
Makhmud Esambayev, Dancer.

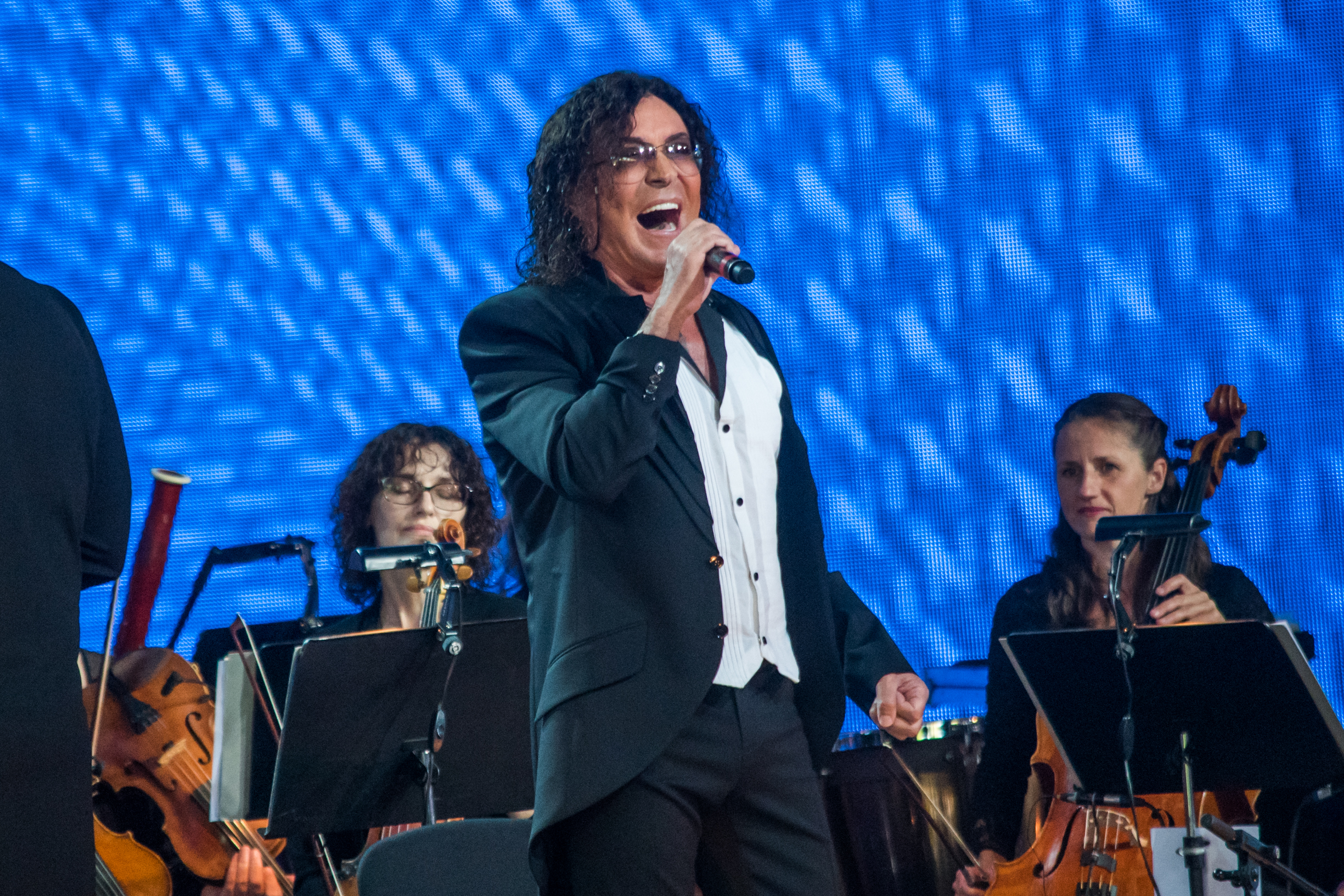
Valery Leontiev, Pop singer.

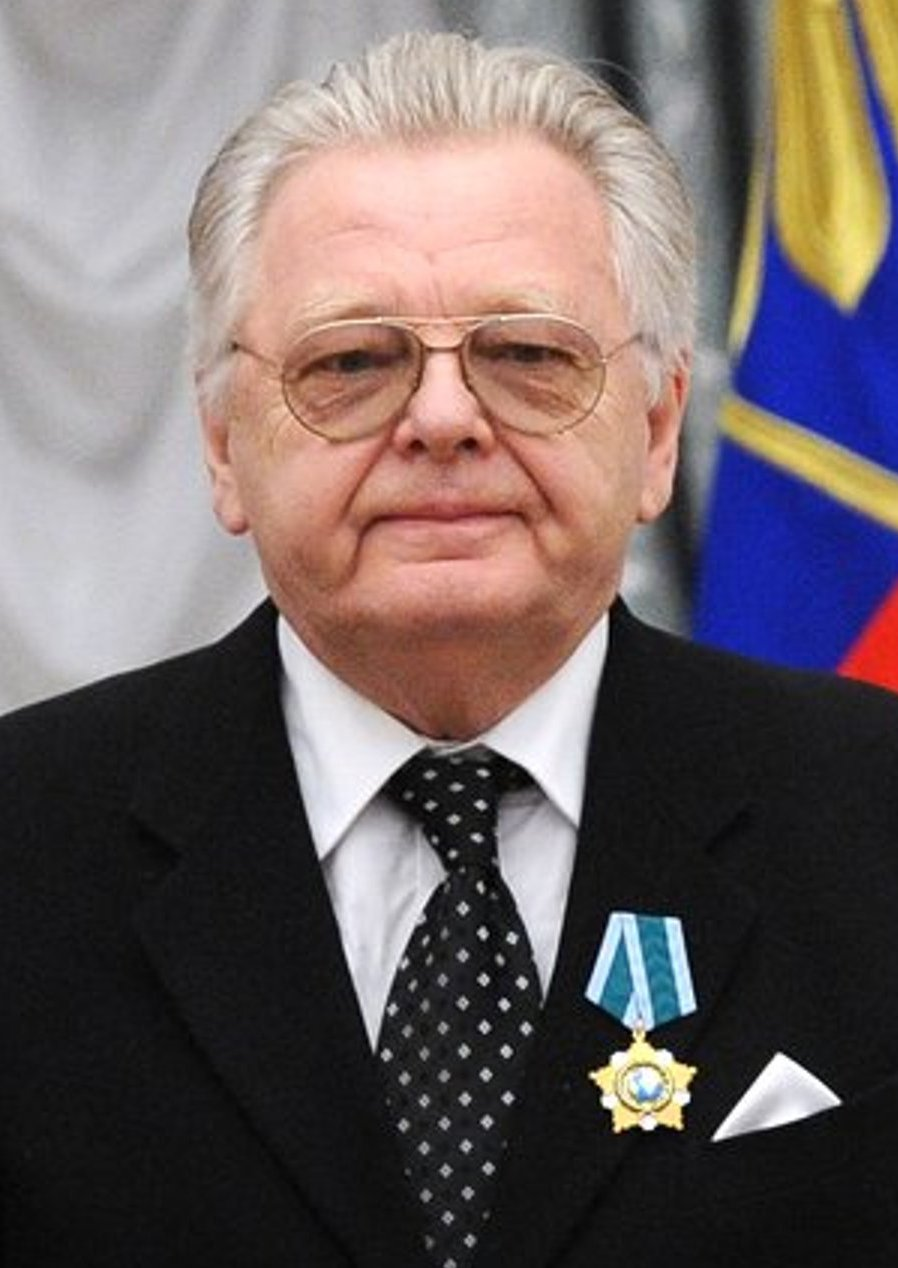
Yuri Antonov, Composer, singer

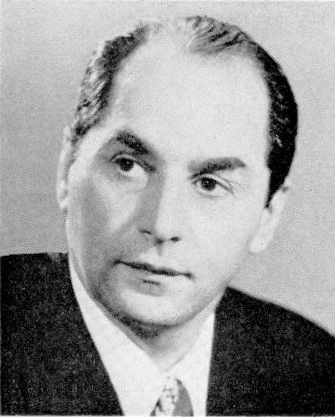
Igor Moiseyev, Choreographer of character dance.

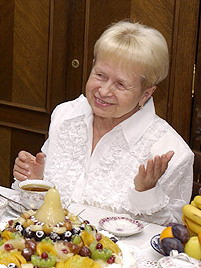
Aleksandra Pakhmutova, Composer.

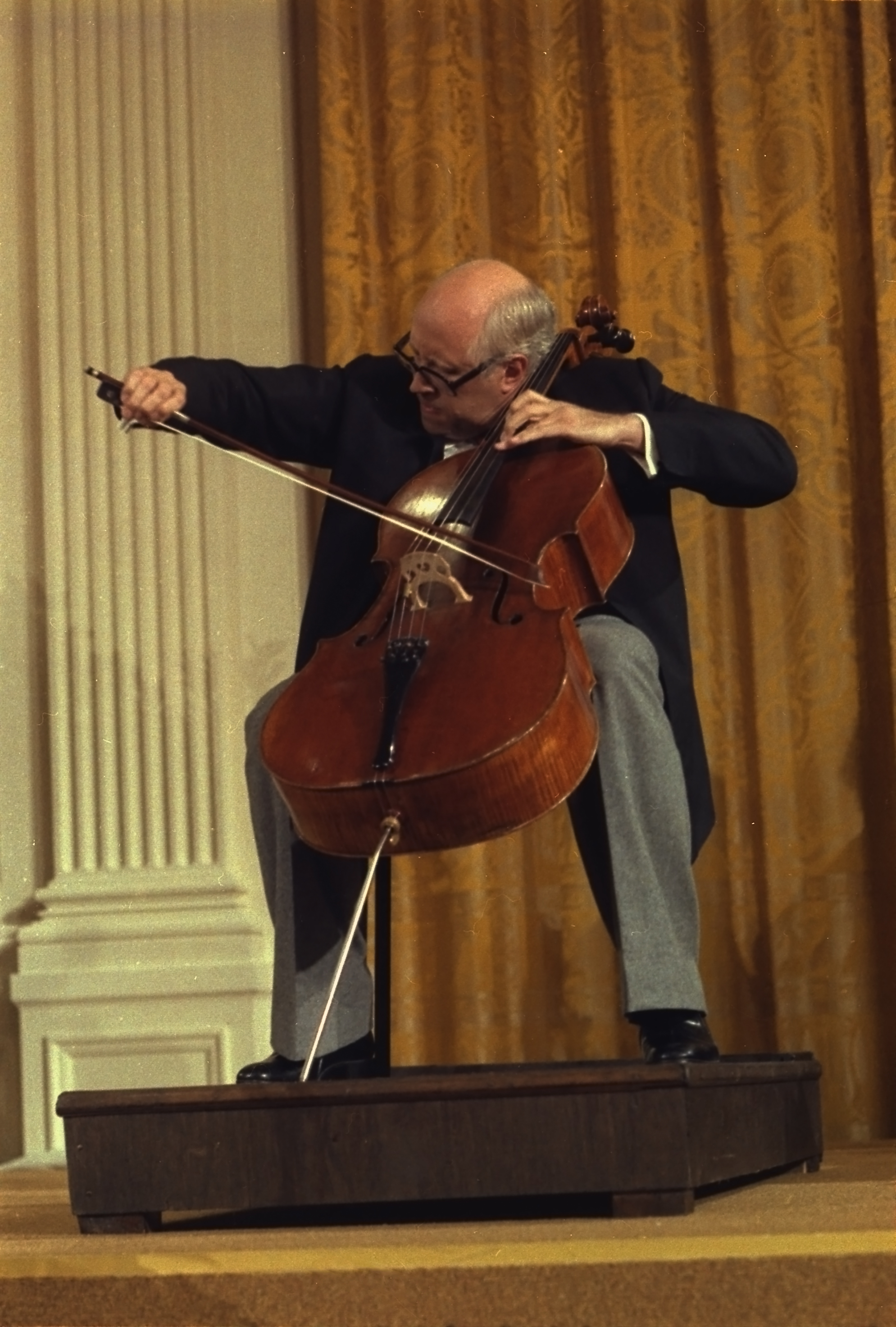
Mstislav Rostropovich, Cellist and conductor.

Maria Mulyash, Music editor.

== See also ==
- Russian pop music
