= Aija Kukule =

Latvian singer

- Born: 1 October 1956 (age 68); Rēzekne, Latvia
- Occupation: Singer

Aija Kukule (born 1 October 1956) is a Latvian singer.

She performed at the 1981 Mikrofona aptauja with Līga Kreicberga. Their song was "Dāvāja Māriņa meitenei mūžiņu" (English: Dear Māra gave the girl life). The song was later a big hit in Soviet Union and covered by many artists, most famously by Alla Pugacheva. Aija Kukule received the Grand Music Award in 1993.

== Discography ==
- Naktsputni [with "Modo"]. Melodija, 1978.
- Dzied Aija Kukule [EP]. Melodija, 1980.
- Dzied Aija Kukule un "Dzeguzīte". 1985.
- Raimonda Paula dziesmas. Melodija, 1985.
- Meža gulbji. Mikrofona ieraksti, 1995.
- Labākās dziesmas. Baltic Records Group, 2005.
