= Yuri Antonov =

Russian composer (born 1945)

- Юрий Антонов
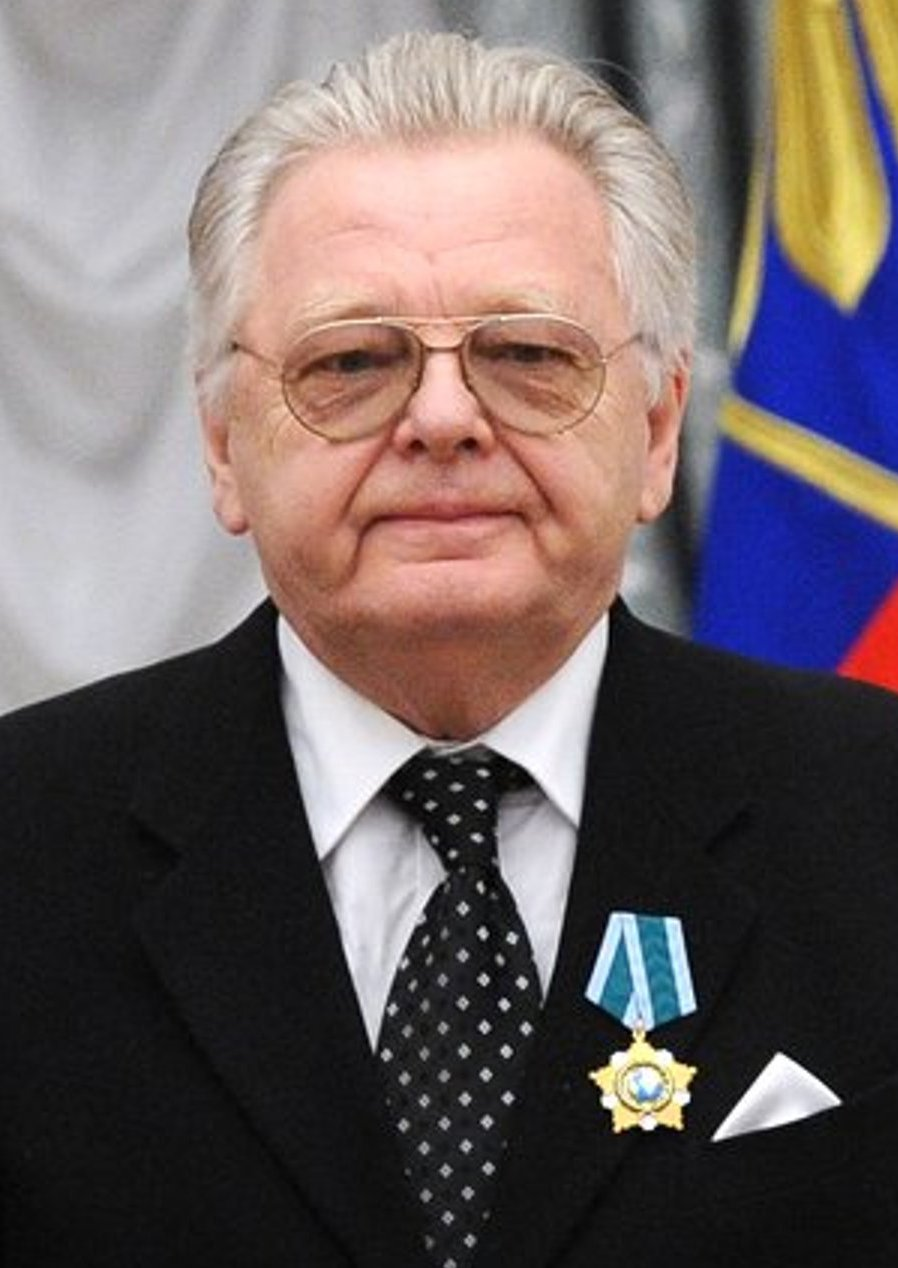
- Antonov in 2015
- Born: 19 February 1945 (age 81); Tashkent, Uzbek SSR, Soviet Union
- Occupations: Singer; composer; sound engineer
- Years active: 1964–present
- Title: People's Artist of Russia (1997)
- Awards: Order "For Merit to the Fatherland" (Russia, 4th class); Order of Honour (Russia); Order of Friendship (Russia); Order of Francysk Skaryna (Belarus)

Yuri Mikhailovich Antonov (Russian: Юрий Михайлович Антонов; born 19 February 1945) is a Soviet and Russian composer, singer and musician, People's Artist of Russia (1997).

== Biography ==
Yuri Mikhailovich Antonov was born into the family of an officer of the Soviet Army, Mikhail Vasilievich Antonov, who after World War II stayed to serve in the military administration of Berlin. Yuri's sister, Zhanna (Jane) was born there. His mother, Natalya Mikhailovna (Litovchenko), who was from Kremenchuk (Poltava Region), died in 2008 at age 85.

Antonov is one of the most popular and successful artists on Soviet 70's-80's pop scene despite the fact that some of his songs (especially in early period) were banned by Soviet censorship. He appeared to an international television audience as a performer in the opening ceremony of the Moscow 1986 Goodwill Games.

== Views ==
He ran in the 1999 elections to the State Duma of the Russian Federation as a candidate of the Russian Conservative Party of Entrepreneurs.

He holds monarchist and nationalist views.

In June 2008, he took part in a rally on Pushkinskaya Square in Moscow in support of homeless animals.

He is a member of the Public Council under the Investigative Committee of the Russian Federation.

In mid-June 2023, amid the Russian invasion of Ukraine, he supported and joined an initiative to pay rewards, from personal funds, to Russian military personnel and civilians for destroying Leopard tanks operated by the Ukrainian military.

== Awards ==
- Distinguished Artist of Chechnya-Ingushetia (1983)
- People's Artist of Russia (1997)
- Order "For Merit to the Fatherland" (3rd class)
- Order of Honour (Russia)
- Order of Friendship (Russia)
- Order of Francysk Skaryna

In 1997 Yuri Antonov received a star on the Star Square in Moscow. He also received the Living Legend Award at the Ovation Awards in 2000.

== Discography ==
- Yuri Antonov (1979)
- Krysha doma tvoyego (1983)
- Pover v mechtu (1985)
- Dolgozhdannyy samolyot (1986)
- Ot pechali do radosti (1987)
- Lunnaya dorozhka (1990)
- Nesyot menya techeniye (1993)
- Net tebya prekrsney (2008)

He wrote music for the films "Take Care of Women" (1981), "Beauty Salon" (1985), "Fools Die on Fridays" (1990) and others.

== Filmography ==
- ''Why don't we sing!'' (1968)
- ''Where will he go!'' (1981)
- "An unfamiliar song" (1983)
- ''Before we break up'' (1984)
