= Valery Leontiev discography =

- Studio albums: 22
- Compilation albums: 12
- Singles: 19
- Music videos: 17

Valery Leontiev discography contains all works associated with the Russian singer and actor Valery Leontiev.

Valery Leontiev has released 24 studio albums between 1983 and 2019. His recordings span the Soviet and post-Soviet periods, moving from vinyl releases on Soviet labels to later CD albums issued in Russia. His discography reflects a long career in Russian pop music, with regular releases from the 1980s through the 2010s.

== Singles ==
- 1980 Kruzatsa disky (Кружатся диски)
- 1980 Fall in Love Again at random (Опять Влюбляюсь Невпопад)
- 1980 Dance time in the sun (Танцевальный час на солнце)
- 1981 Beloved sights (Ненаглядная сторона)
- 1982 Thank you, love (Спасибо, любовь )
- 1982 Multicolored fair (Разноцветные ярмарки)
- 1982 Muse (Муза)
- 1985 Prompter (Суфлёр)
- 1985 Alone with all (Наедине со всеми)
- 1985 Bitter apples (Горькие яблоки)
- 1985 Two under rain (Двое под дождем)
- 1985 Senorita Grace (Сеньорита Грация)
- 1985 Excuse me, waves (Простите меня, волны)
- 1986 Our era (Наша эра)
- 1986 The birth of the day (Рождение дня)
- 1987 Star plot (Звёздный сюжет)
- 1987 White crow (Белая ворона)
- 1989 Giordano (Джордано)
- 1995 On the way to Hollywood (По дороге в Голливуд)

== Studio albums ==
Year (P)	Number	Original title	Title in English	Format	Label, country
1983	С60—19873-4	Муза	Muse	LP	Melodiya, USSR
1984	С60—21271-2	Диалог	Dialogue	LP	Melodiya, USSR
1984	С60—21545-6	Премьера	Premiere	LP	Melodiya, USSR
1986	С60—23753-4	Дискоклуб 16(Б)	Disco club 16 B	LP	Melodiya, USSR
1986	С60—24623-4	Бархатный сезон	Velvet season	LP	Melodiya, USSR
1988	С60—26737-8	Я – просто певец	I am – just a singer	LP	Melodiya, USSR
1990	С60 30317 006	Дело вкуса	A matter of taste	LP, CD	Melodiya, USSR
1990	С60—30317-8	Грешный путь	Wicked Way	LP, CD	Melodiya, USSR
1993	SNCD - 3013	Ночь	Night	LP, CD	SNC records, USSR
1993	R90 02179-80	Полнолуние	Full Moon	LP, CD	Аprelevka Sound Inc, Russia
1994	R90 01913	У ворот Господних	At the gate of the Lord	LP	Aprelevka Sound, Russia
1995	AXMC 3-0038	По дороге в Голливуд	On the road to Hollywood	CD	APEX Records, Russia
1998	AXCD5-0054	Санта-Барбара	Santa Barbara	CD	DANA Music, Russia
1999	АРС027-99	Канатный плясун	Rope-Dancer	CD	АРС Records, Russia
1999	VL042/99-2	Каждый хочет любить	Everyone wants to love	CD	VL-Studio, Russia
2001	VL043/01-2	Августин	Augustine	CD	VL-Studio, Russia
2003	VL 045-02	Кленовый лист	Maple Leaf	CD	VL-Studio, Russia
2004	GR CD - 387	Ночной звонок	Night Call	CD	Grand Records, Russia
2005	GR CD - 433	Падаю в небеса	I fall into the heavens	CD	Grand Records, Russia
2009	МТ 1000294-230-1	Годы странствий	The years of wandering	CD	Monolit Records, Russia
2011	МТ 000410-738-1	Художник	Painter	CD	Monolit Records, Russia
2014	МТ 001091-383-1	Любовь-капкан	Love-Trap	CD	Monolit Records, Russia
2016		Это любовь	This is love		
2019		Я вернусь	I will come back		

=== Magnetic tape Albums ===
- 1986 Velvet season (Бархатный сезон)
- 1987 I am – just a singer (Я - просто-певец)
- 1989 A matter of taste (Дело вкуса)
- 1990 Wicked Way (Грешный путь)

=== Compilation albums ===
- 1987 Valeri Leontjev
- 1988 Songs from the film How to become a star (Песни из к/ф Как стать звездой)
- 1993 Last evening (Последний вечер)
- 1993 Valery Leontiev. Laima Vaikule: "Ah, vernissage, ah ... (Валерий Леонтьев. Лайма Вайкуле: «Ах, вернисаж, ах…)
- 1994 Touch (Прикоснись)
- 1995 There, in September. The best of Leontiev (Там, в сентябре. The best of Leontiev)
- 1998 Nine chrysanthemums (Девять хризантем)
- 1999 Best songs 1 (Valery Leontiev) (1999) («Лучшие песни-1(Валерий Леонтьев)» (1999))
- 1999 Best songs 2 (Valery Leontiev) (1999) («Лучшие песни-2(Валерий Леонтьев)» (1999))
- 2002 Bird in a cage (Птицa в клeткe)
- 2014 The guilty one (Виновник)
- 2014 Valery Leontiev. Margarita (Валерий Леонтьев. Маргарита)

=== Other official publication (MC, CD) ===
- 1985 Alone with all, MC (Наедине со всеми)
- 1985 Memory, MC (Воспоминание)
- 1987 Valery Leontiev Sings, MC (Поёт Валерий Леонтьев)
- 1987 Valeri Leontiev. The best songs, MC
- 1987 Valeri Leontiev. Top hits/2, MC
- 1999 Star series (Valery Leontiev) CD, MC (Звездная серия (Валерий Леонтьев))
- 2000 Golden Collection of Russia (Valery Leontiev) CD (Золотая коллекция России (Валерий Леонтьев))
- 2001 The BEST of Valery Leontiev, (CD) (The BEST of Валерий Леонтьев)
- 2001 Valery Leontiev. Star series, (2CD) (Валерий Леонтьев. Звездная серия)
- 2004 Valery Leontiev. Best songs (MC, CD) (Валерий Леонтьев. Лучшие песни)
- 2004 Grand Collection (MC, CD)

== Videography ==
- Psychic, 1991 (VSH), 2005 (DVD) (Экстрасенс)
- Valery Leontiev in super show "Full Moon", 1994, VSH Vl studio, 1995, VHS, ZeKo REKORDS (Валерий Леонтьев в супершоу «Полнолуние»)
- Musical ring 1986, Valery Leontiev, 1997, VHS (Музыкальный ринг 1986: Валерий Леонтьев)
- Musical Ring 1997: Leontiev against Leontiev, 1997 (VHS) (Музыкальный ринг 1997: Леонтьев против Леонтьева)
- Valery Leontiev in super show "On the way to Hollywood", 1997, VHS (Валерий Леонтьев в супершоу "По дороге в Голливуд")
- Photographer of Dreams, 1999, (DVD) (Валерий Леонтьев - Фотограф сновидений)
- Valery Leontiev in the Square of Stars, 2002 (Mpeg4), 2005 (DVD) (Валерий Леонтьев на Площади Звезд)
- Valery Leontiev. Collection of 7 DVD, 2005 (DVD) (Валерий Леонтьев. Коллекция из 7-ми DVD)
- You are invited by Valery Leontyev, 2006, (DVD) (Вас приглашает Валерий Леонтьев)
- Recital in the concert hall "Russia", 2007, (DVD) (Сольный концерт в ГЦКЗ «Россия»)
- The Book of Fate - Valery Leontiev ,2010, (DVD) (Книга судьбы - Валерий Леонтьев)
- Best Forever! Jubilee concert in the Kremlin ,2012, (DVD) (Лучший Навсегда! Юбилейный Концерт В Кремле)

== Books ==
- Valery Leontiev: Biography (1998 book, the author - A.Yurikov) (Валерий Леонтьев: Биография)
- Valery Leontiev: My Scene (2009 album + CD) (Валерий Леонтьев: Моя сцена)
- Wicked Angel Valery Leontiev (2009 book, the author -T.Fedotkina) (Грешный ангел Валерий Леонтьев)
