= Television in Kazakhstan =

Television in Kazakhstan was introduced in 1958. There are 116 private channels and 4 national commercial television.

Qazaqstan is the State Television Channel of Kazakhstan. Other country-wide television stations are Khabar and Yel Arna.

Gakku TV and Toi Duman are music channels dedicated solely to only airing music produced in Kazakhstan.

In December 2021, Kazakh Information and Social Protection Minister Aida Balayeva announced that the film industry in Kazakhstan produced over 250 TV series from 2016 to 2021.

== Public channels ==
- Qazaqstan – public broadcaster
- KTK – commercial
- NTK-TV – commercial
- Stan TV – commercial

== Private channels ==
- NTV Plus – news
- Digital-TV – news
- Orbita Telecom – other
- JSC Alma-TV – other
- JSC ICON – other
- JSC Digital-TV – other
- IDNet – other
- Astana TV – other
- Balapan (channel) – children
- Channel 31 (Kazakhstan)
- Channel One Eurasia – other
- Gakku TV – music, entertainment news
- HiT TV – music
- Kanal 7 – information, entertainment
- Kazakh TV – information
- Khabar – news
- Khabar 24 – news
- KZ Sport 1 – sport
- Qazsport – sport

== Most viewed channels ==
Position	Channel	Share of total viewing (%)
1	Qazaqstan TV	16.5
2	Channel One Eurasia	14.1
3	Khabar	8.4
4	NTK TV	6.2
5	Kanal 7	4.8
6	Astana TV	3.5
7	KTK	2.5
8	Channel 31	2.1
9	Kazakh TV	1.2
10	Khabar 24	0.6
