= El Arna =

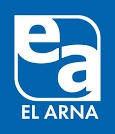
- Country: Kazakhstan
- Broadcast area: Kazakhstan
- Headquarters: Almaty, Kazakhstan

Programming
- Languages: Kazakh, Russian

Ownership
- Owner: Khabar Agency
- Sister channels: Khabar; Khabar 24; Jibek Joly TV

History
- Launched: 23 March 2000; 26 years ago
- Closed: 1 May 2025; 15 months ago

Links
- Website: khabar.kz

El Arna (Kazakh: Ел Арна, romanized: El Arna, [jɪl ɑɾnɑ], "The People's Channel") was a Kazakh TV channel owned by the Khabar Agency. It was established in 2000 as Khabar 2 and gained an identity of its own in 2002, where it was relaunched several times. It shut down between 2014 and 2017, having lost its terrestrial network to 24kz, but resumed in 2017 as a cable channel, before shutting down again in 2025 due to market conditions, merging with Khabar.

== History ==
=== Khabar 2 ===
The Khabar Agency announced plans for an all-Kazakh TV channel in 1998. The initial plan was to merge the two state channels, Khabar and Qazaqstan-1, using the latter's infrastructure. The plan failed and Khabar opted to create a second standalone channel instead.

Khabar announced on 27 January 2000 that it would launch Khabar 2 from mid-March. Initial rumors suggested that the channel would replace ORT Kazakhstan, but it was later revealed that the new channel would not replace ORT and have a line-up of its own with national coverage. Initially, the channel would broadcast from 7pm to 11pm, with a cultural and educational line-up. There would be a news bulletin, but no politics. On 12 February, a 22 March launch date was announced, being the date of the spring holiday (Nowruz, known in Kazakhstan as Nawryz). The main programs of the new channel would cater to the "national way of life", such as 1001 Proverbs, A Good Joke and the satirical program Telling 40 Lies. Kaynar Olzhay was the channel's chief producer. The launch ceremony of the new channel featured presenters Dana Nurzhigit and Akylbek Sansyzbay-uly descending from a rope on Republic Square in Almaty, which consisted of an outdoor party. The idea of the rope was to enable the presenters to descend from the "heavens" (from the roof of Khabar's seven-floor headquarters) In early April, Khabar launched its website and Khabar 2's news programs were included in it.

Khabar 2 was established as part of increased commercial revenue during the first five years of the original Khabar channel (which included the popular Crossroads soap opera) and broadcast entirely in Kazakh. Plans were outlined for the creation of further channels, educational channel Khabar 3, children's channel Khabar 4 and youth channel Khabar 5. The channel faced coverage problems in Kyzylorda in July, owing to outdated equipment which was used to broadcast the former Alatau channel; a solution was found following the rejection of an existing channel using a 500-watt UHF transmitter. Expansion plans for eastern Kazakhstan were enabled. Khabar 2 was one of the channels that took place in digital terrestrial television trials in August 2000. In February 2001, the Kazakh community in Uzbekistan requested the channel to be available locally in order to meet their demands, as media in Kazakh was hard to find outside of Tashkent.

On 22 March 2001, to mark a full year of broadcasts, Khabar 2 increased its airtime from four hours to seven, owing to the success of the project. Signal reached Say Otes in southwestern Kazakhstan thanks to a US$6,000 payment for KazTransOil to install satellite relay equipment to relay the channel terrestrially in the area.

The channel almost merged with the ailing Qazaqstan-1 in October 2001, per a plan by Dariga Nazarbayeva to merge the two state channels for efficiency. The Qazaqstan-1 viewing audience began to watch the channel more at the time of the merger announcement in order to save it. The name of the merged channel would be simply Qazaqstan. It moved to new premises on 19 February 2002, while also improving its technical equipment. Its second anniversary on 22 March would be marked with another expansion, from seven horus to eleven.

=== El Arna's first phase ===
Days ahead of the planned expansion, Khabar announced that it would rename Khabar 2 as El Arna effective 22 March. The change also affected its contents: instead of being the educational channel it was at the time of launch, it was positioned as an entertainment channel for Kazakhs of all ages and backgrounds. This consisted largely of a new line of original programs and dubbed feature filmes to attract the youth. Most importantly, the new model (based on ORT) withdrew the single-language approach and became a bilingual channel, in Kazakh and Russian. At least 50% of the programming would remain in Kazakh due to new media laws. There were also plans to air telenovelas from Latin America, Russia and Turkey, while cutting the amount of European and American films seen on the network.

In September, the main Khabar channel started airing some of El Arna's programs. Khabar had wider coverage, including in rural areas, while El Arna was received in 44% of the country (Khabar reached 84%). El Arna's coverage was mainly limited to regional capitals except Pavlodar.

=== Reformat ===
In 2008, president Nursultan Nazarbayev announced the reconversion into a culture, sports and youth channel. This caused a change to its format, as well as coverage of the 2008 Summer Olympics and boxing tournaments, plus a sports news program. The new phase also included a package of BBC miniseries, such as The Aristocrats, David Copperfield and Bleak House, which were seen with good critical acclaim from the local audience. Its original productions were also reconfigured to cater the new schedule.

Khabar shut down El Arna on 18 March 2014, following a series of rumors regarding the closure of the channel that were scheduled for March or April. The funds were relocated for 24kz, Khabar's newly launched news channel, and the production of new Kazakh movies. The channel was budgeted at 2 billion tenge, yet had an operational return of only 300 million. Little more than half of the budget was allocated for 24kz's regional correspondents, while the smaller half was allocated for film production. The team working for the channel believed that the theory where low ratings caused its closure was absurd.

=== Relaunch ===
Three years after being shut down by Khabar, the channel was revived on 27 March 2017, this time as a movie channel. The relaunch was largely due to a flood of foreign TV series hitting prominent Kazakh TV networks. Unlike the previous iteration, the channel was not available terrestrially, but rather on cable and satellite. The relaunch was marked with the airing of the film An-aga. On 27 March 2022, the channel's format changed again, making the channel aimed at the youth, like it was when it was a terrestrial channel. Seventeen new programs were announced, including TED Talks, game shows, talk shows, IT programming and esports. The rest of the line-up would consist of films and TV series.

On 11 March 2025, the Minister of Culture and Information Aida Balayeva announced that El Arna would shut down effective 1 May and that some of its relevant programs would move to Khabar. The shutdown took into consideration changes to the Kazakh media landscape and also optimizing state resources. The funds used for the channel were reallocated for Khabar and 24kz.
