= Balapan =

Balapan may refer to:

- Balapan (TV channel), a children's television channel in Kazakhstan
- Balapan, Republic of Bashkortostan, Russia
- Balapan Station (Solo Balapan), the largest railway station in Surakarta, Indonesia
- Balapan Complex, a sector of the Semipalatinsk Test Site that includes lake Shagan, Abai Region, Kazakhstan
