= Lyazzat Tanysbay =

- Ләззат Мұратқызы Танысбай
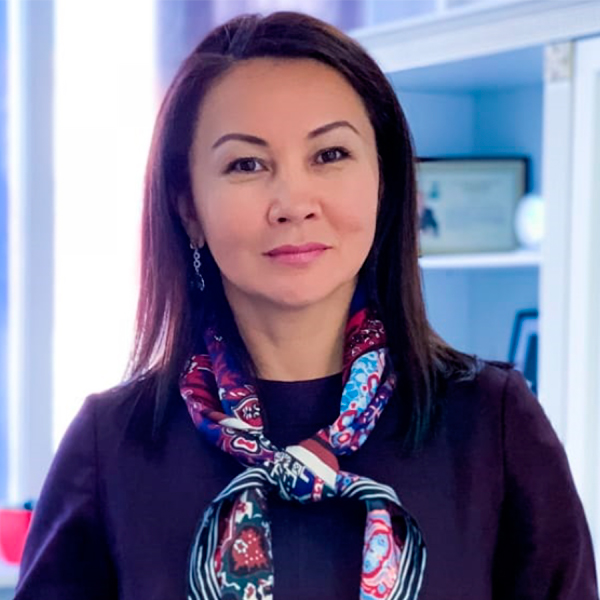
- Tanysbay in 2018

CEO of JSC «RTRC «Kazakhstan»
- Incumbent
- Assumed office April 2019

CEO of holding «NUR Media»
- In office July 2018 – April 2019

CEO of TV channel «ASTANA»
- In office February 2012 – April 2019

Vice Minister of Communications and Information of the Kazakhstan
- In office November 2011 – February 2012

First Deputy of JSC «RTRC «Kazakhstan»
- In office October 2008 – November 2011

Deputy Chairman of the Information and Archives Committee
- In office September 2005 – October 2008

Chief Expert of the Press Service of the Presidential Administration
- In office November 2002 – September 2005

Executive Producer (Khabar Agency)
- In office February 2001 – November 2002

News presenter (Khabar Agency)
- In office February 1996 – February 2001

Editor, reporter, presenter (Kazakhstan TV)
- In office December 1993 – February 1996

Personal details
- Born: 11 October 1973 (age 51); Urzhar, Kazakhstan
- Political party: AMANAT

Lyazzat Muratkyzy Tanysbay (Kazakh: Ләззат Мұратқызы Танысбай); (born 11 October 1973, Urzhar, Kazakhstan) is a Kazakh journalist, media manager and, since April 2019, CEO of JSC «Republican Television and Radio Corporation «Kazakhstan».

== Biography ==
Lyazzat Tanysbay was born on 11 October 1973 in the village of Urzhar, East Kazakhstan Region.

She graduated from the Almaty Institute of International Journalism. She began her career in 1993 as an editor, and later worked as a reporter, and a TV presenter for the Republican TV and Radio Corporation "Kazakhstan".

Since the creation of one of the largest state–owned media in the country, the Khabar TV channel, in 1996, she has worked as an editor-presenter, and executive producer of the news service.

In 2002, she held the positions of chief expert, head of the sector, chief inspector in the Press service of the Presidential Administration of the Republic of Kazakhstan.

From 2005 to 2008, she was a Deputy Chairwoman of the Information and Archives Committee.

From 2008 to 2011, she worked as the First Deputy chairperson of the board of JSC Republican Television and Radio Corporation "Kazakhstan".

In 2011, she was appointed Vice Minister of Information and Communications of the Ministry of Culture, Information and Sports of the Republic of Kazakhstan.

In February 2012, she headed the republican Astana TV channel, and since 5 July 2018, she has simultaneously headed the Nur-Media holding, which united several newspapers, radio, and online publications of the country.

In 2019, she became a head of the Republican Television and Radio Corporation "Kazakhstan", which includes 14 regional TV channels, 4 republican TV channels and 4 republican radio channels. Kazakhstan TV and Radio Corporation is the largest media company in the country, occupying a leading position in terms of broadcasting volume and population coverage.

In 2020, with the direct participation of Lyazzat Tanysbay, a new cultural and educational TV channel "Abai TV" was created, which raised the production of niche television projects of cultural, educational orientation in the domestic television industry to a new level.

In 2021, Qazaqstan TV and Radio Corporation launched the Altynqor.com (The golden collection) website. The website features names and voices, as well information about famous people. It broadcasts video and audio feeds from the Kazakh Television and Raio Fund starting from 1930.
