= Ainur Mammadova =

Azerbaijani para-taekwondo practitioner

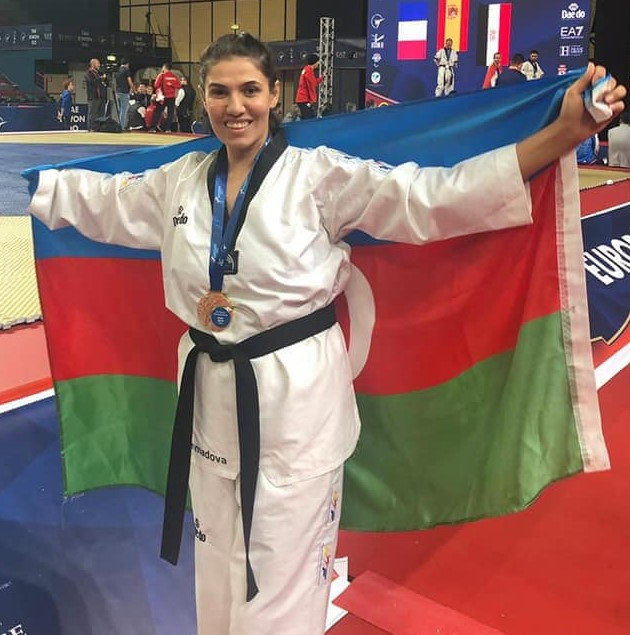

Personal information
- Nationality: Azerbaijan
- Citizenship: Azerbaijani
- Born: 21 February 1979 (age 46) Urdzhar

Sport
- Sport: Taekwondo

Ainur Mammadova (born 21 February 1979) is an Azerbaijani para-taekwondo practitioner competing in the K44 disability category and over 58 kg weight category, master of sports, two-time world champion (2012 and 2015) and four-time European champion (2011, 2016, 2018 and 2019), silver medallist at the 2014 World Championships, bronze medallist at the 2010 World Championships and the 2016 European Championships. She represented Azerbaijan at the 2020 Summer Paralympics in Tokyo, but was not allowed to compete due to a positive test for COVID-19.

== Biography ==
Ainur Tofik kyzy Mammadova was born on 21 February 1979, in the village of Teze Shilyan in the Ujar region of the Azerbaijan SSR. She has a congenital disability: Mammadova was born without her right arm. In 1986, Mammadova went to a rural school, from which she graduated in 1996, after which she moved to Baku in order to enroll in the Azerbaijan State University of Economics. But this year she failed to enroll.

In 1997, Mammadova passed the exams again, but again failed. After that, she applied to college and enrolled in the College of Finance and Economics, from which she graduated in 2001. Mammadova later graduated from the Azerbaijan State Academy of Physical Education and Sports. She is also an employee of the Ministry of Emergency Situations of Azerbaijan.

While living in Baku, Ainur Mammadova started shooting sports in 1998 and working in the Society of Disabled Women. But since Mammadova did not have a right hand, she could not participate in international tournaments. One day, Mammadova was offered to practice parathekwondo. Since 2010, she has started physical training and started participating in training camps.

The first training camp, in which Mammadova took part, was held in the Gusar district. Already in May 2010, Mammadova competed at the World Championships in St. Petersburg, where she won a bronze medal. In 2011, she won the European Championship in Moscow.

In 2012, Ainur Mammadova won the World Championship in Santa Cruz (Aruba). In 2013, she took 5th place at the World Championships in Lausanne, Switzerland. In 2014, she won silver at the World Championships in Moscow. At this tournament, Mammadova met in the final with a taekwondo athlete from Denmark. Leading the score, Mammadova made a mistake at the end of the match, which led to defeat.

In 2013, she became the bronze medallist of the European Championship, and in 2014 in Antalya she became the winner of the continental championship.

In 2015, at the World Championships in Samsun, Turkey, Ainur Mammadova became a two-time world champion. In November of the same year, Ainur Mammadova was awarded the title of "Master of Sports". The following year she took bronze at the European Championships in Warsaw. In 2018, she became the European champion in Plovdiv, Bulgaria.

In 2019, she took first place at the European Championships in the Italian city of Bari, becoming a two-time champion of the continent. Mammadova broke her leg at this tournament, but managed to win the tournament. In the same year, she took 5th place at the World Championships in Antalya, Turkey, and also won silver at the African Open in Egypt.

On 6 March 2019, Ainur Tofik kyzy Mammadova was awarded the Progress Medal by order of the President of the Republic of Azerbaijan Ilham Aliyev for her fruitful activities in the public life of the Republic of Azerbaijan and on the occasion of International Women's Day on March 8.

In May 2021, Ainur Mammadova won a gold medal in the final of the European qualifying tournament in Sofia and won a license for the XVI Summer Paralympic Games in Tokyo.

At the Tokyo Paralympic Games, Ainur Mammadova was supposed to have her first duel with Yulia Lipetsk from Ukraine. However, the results of both Mammadova's PCR tests for COVID-19, which she passed back in Azerbaijan, turned out to be positive and Mammadova was not allowed to participate in the competition.
