= Qazaq Radiosy =

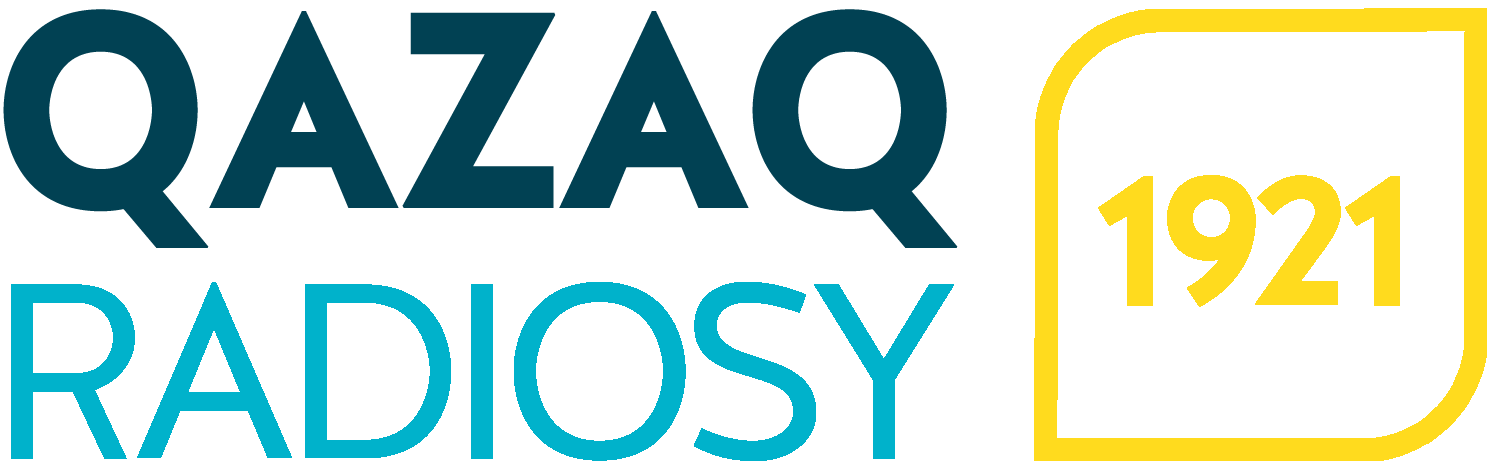
- Kazakhstan
- Frequency: 106.8 MHz (Astana)

Programming
- Format: News, Talk Folk, Culture,

Ownership
- Owner: Qazaqstan Radio and Television Corporation
- Sister stations: Shalkar

History
- First air date: September 29, 1921; 104 years ago

Links
- Website: qazradio.fm/kz

Qazaq Radiosy is the largest broadcasting network in Kazakhstan. It began broadcasting on September 29, 1921, and it is included in the Qazaqstan Radio and Television Corporation. On October 1, 2012, production moved into a new broadcasting media center, QazMedia Ortalygy, in Astana.

== History ==
It was launched by the People's Commissariat of Posts and Telegraphs of the Kazakh ASSR on September 29, 1921 (the date of the decision to create republican radio broadcasting). In October 1921, from Orenburg, the capital of Kazakhstan at that time, broadcasts began throughout the republic. In October 1926, the editorial office was transferred to Kzyl-Orda. It was broadcast for the first time, on March 23, 1927, a Kazakh speech. In 1931, the editorial office moved to Alma-Ata.

From 1932 to 1954, the Kazakh radio had its own choir.
