= Radio Astana =

Astana; Kazakhstan
- Frequency: 101.4 MHz

Programming
- Format: news/talk

Ownership
- Owner: Qazaqstan Radio and Television Corporation

History
- First air date: January 19, 1999

Links
- Website: [qazradio.fm/astanafm/kz/

Radio Astana is a news and music station broadcasting from Astana, Kazakhstan on 101.4 FM. The radio station is a part of "Kazakhstan" corporation. Daily audience of radio stations in Astana and the area is about 475 thousand people. Potential audience of listeners is about 1 million people.

== History ==
Radio Astana started broadcasting from Astana, Kazakhstan on January 19, 1999, at 101.4 FM. Starting from February 1, 2003, the radio station uses modern digital equipment. Radio Astana broadcasts on 101.4 FM frequency. Broadcasts are also available on the Internet and via satellite. On October 1, 2012, the station started broadcasting from new media center "Qazmediaortalygy" in Astana.

== Format ==
During the daytime the radio station broadcasts popular music of artists of Kazakhstan, including old recordings of Kazakh folk music from state archives. Radio Astana is one of the first radio stations in Kazakhstan to broadcast professional club music in late hours.

The radio station operates under the motto "With love in every home".

== Awards ==
The award "AltynZhuldyz" for the best news program in 1999 and 2003, the best radio station in Astana in 2006.

== Programs ==
- «V desjatochku!»
- «Za chashkoj kofe»
- «N2A shou»
- «Astana-Bajterek»
- «Bol'shaja peremena»
- «El men zher»
- «Kazahstan pljus»
- «Kul'turnoe nasledie»
- «Kursor»
- «Medicina dlja vseh»
- «Kazahstanskij put'»
- «Put' k uspehu»
- «Jekonomicheskaja zona»
- «Pered zakonom»
- «Pozicija»
- «10 minut s Parlamentom»
- «Innovacii.KZ»
- «Sobesednik»
- «Social'nyj rejting»
- «Set in session»
- «Stancija "Stolichnaja"»
