= Oral, Kazakhstan =

Oral Орал (Kazakh) Уральск (Russian) Uralsk
- City
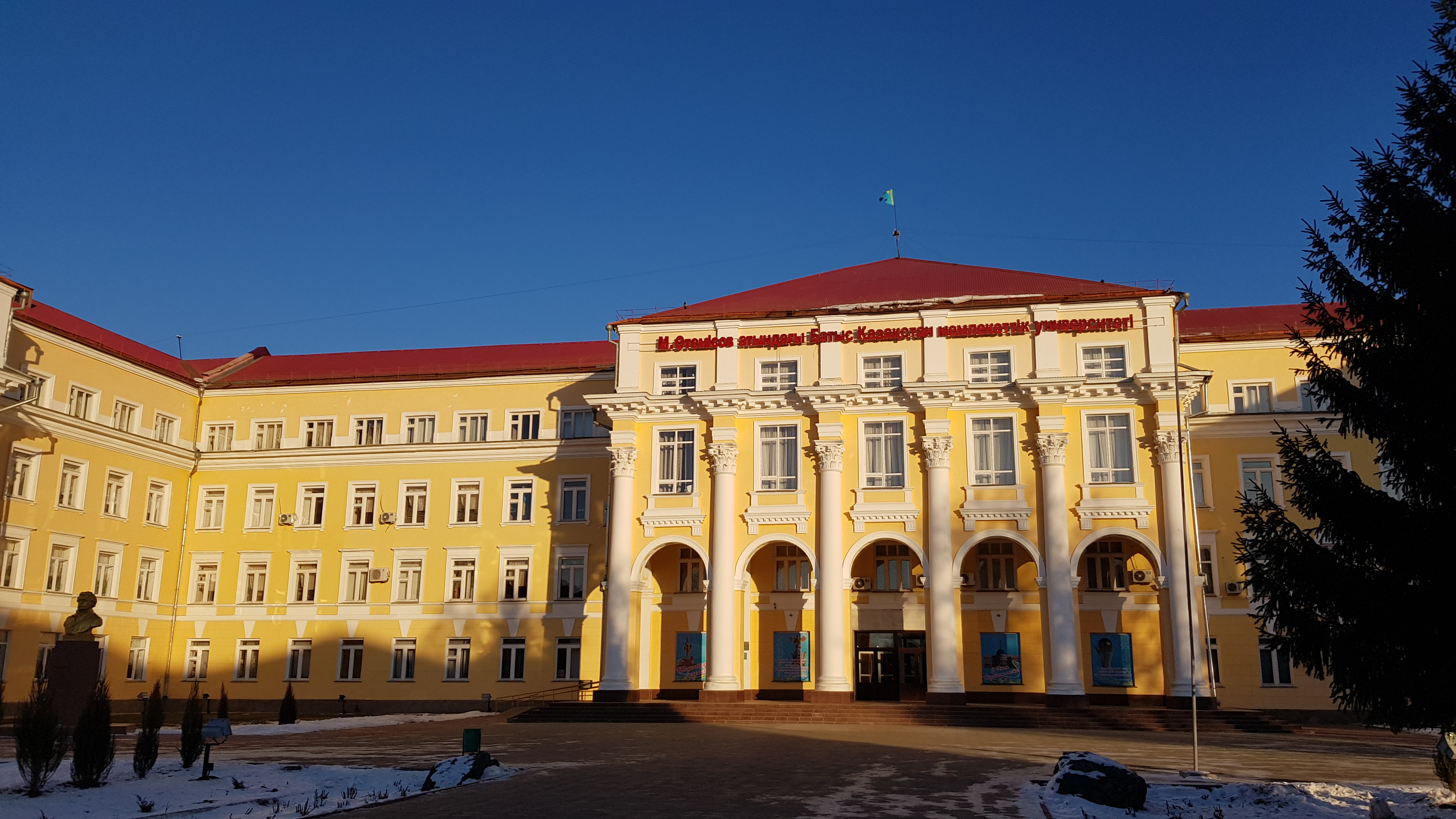
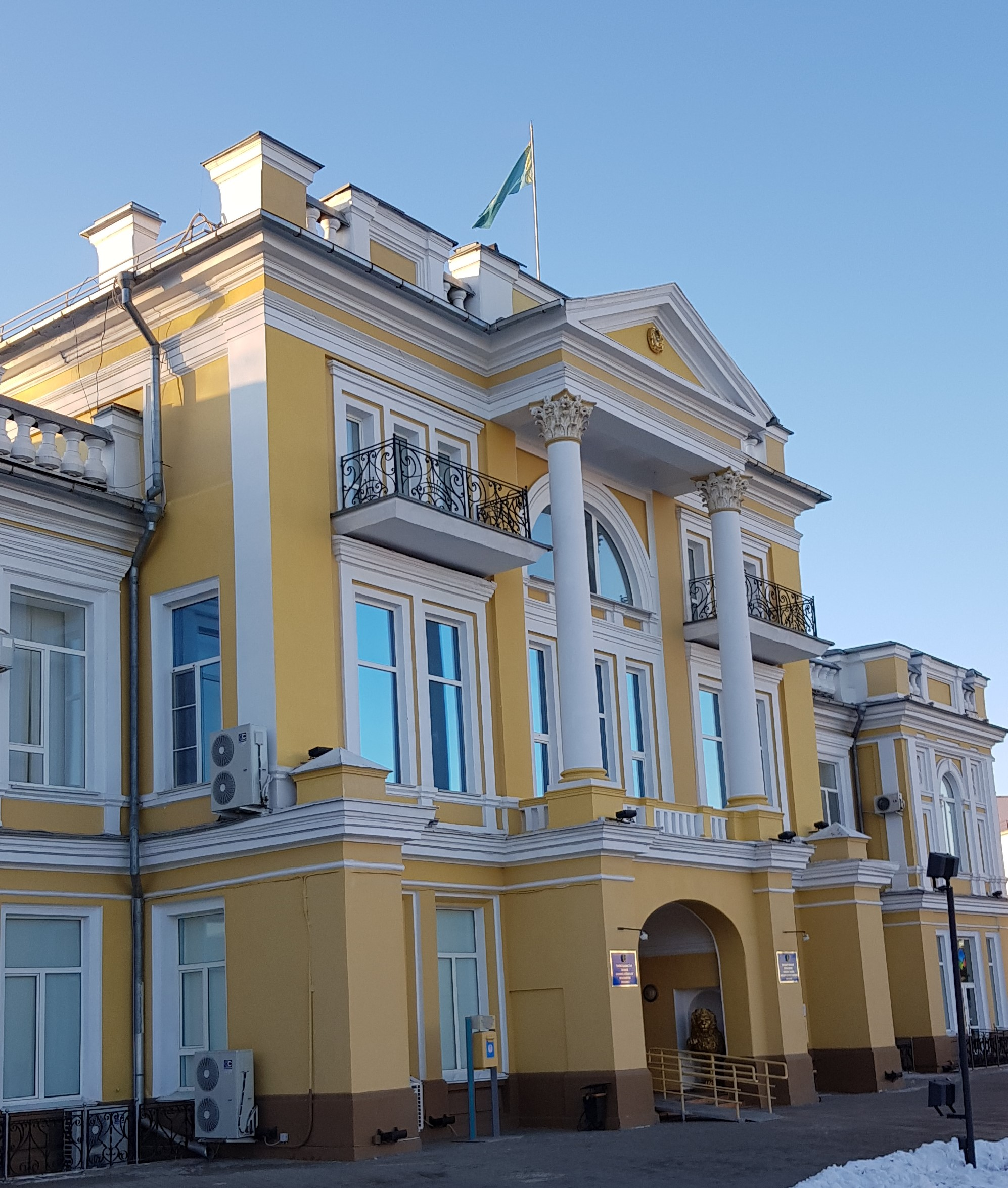
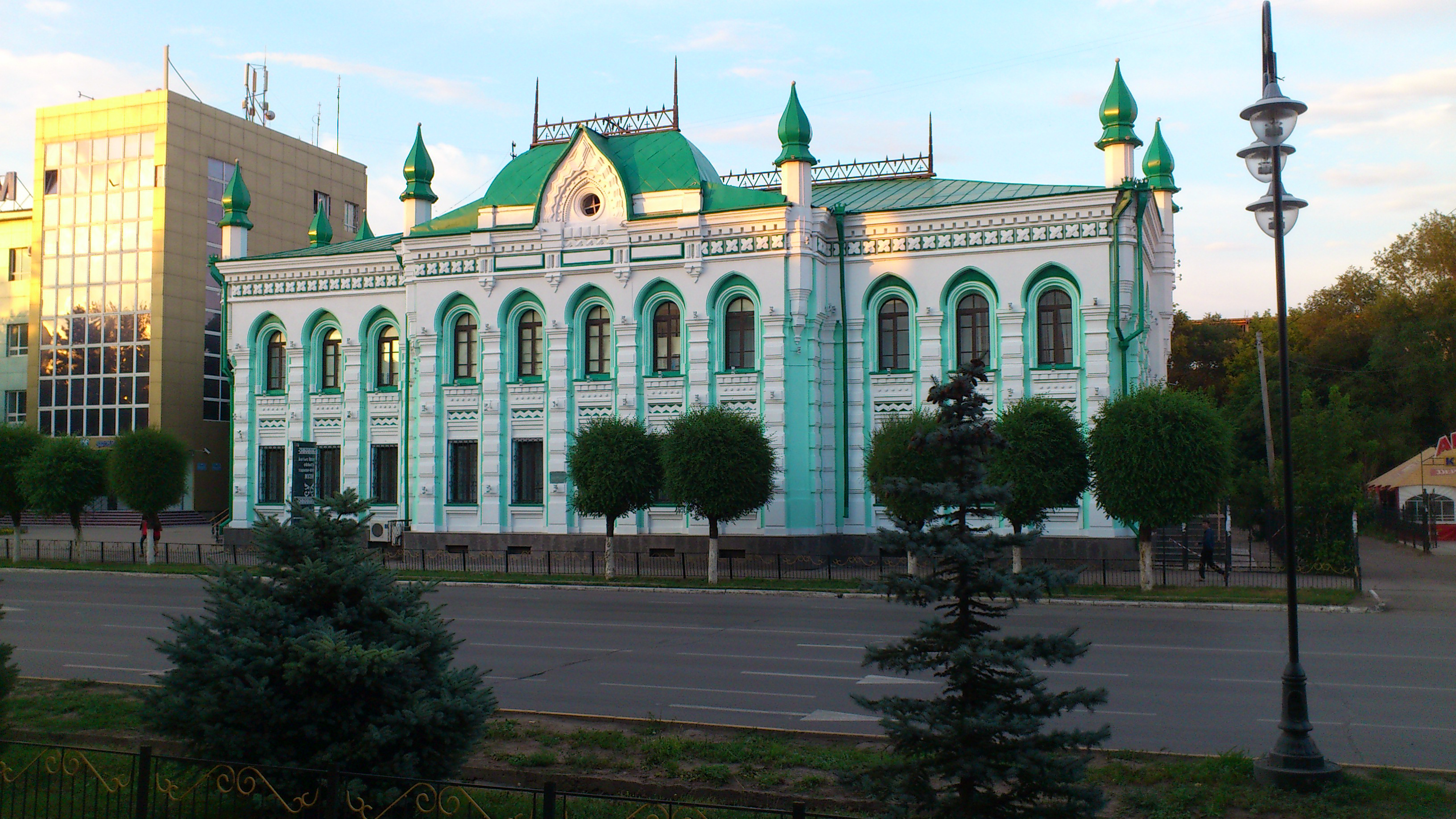
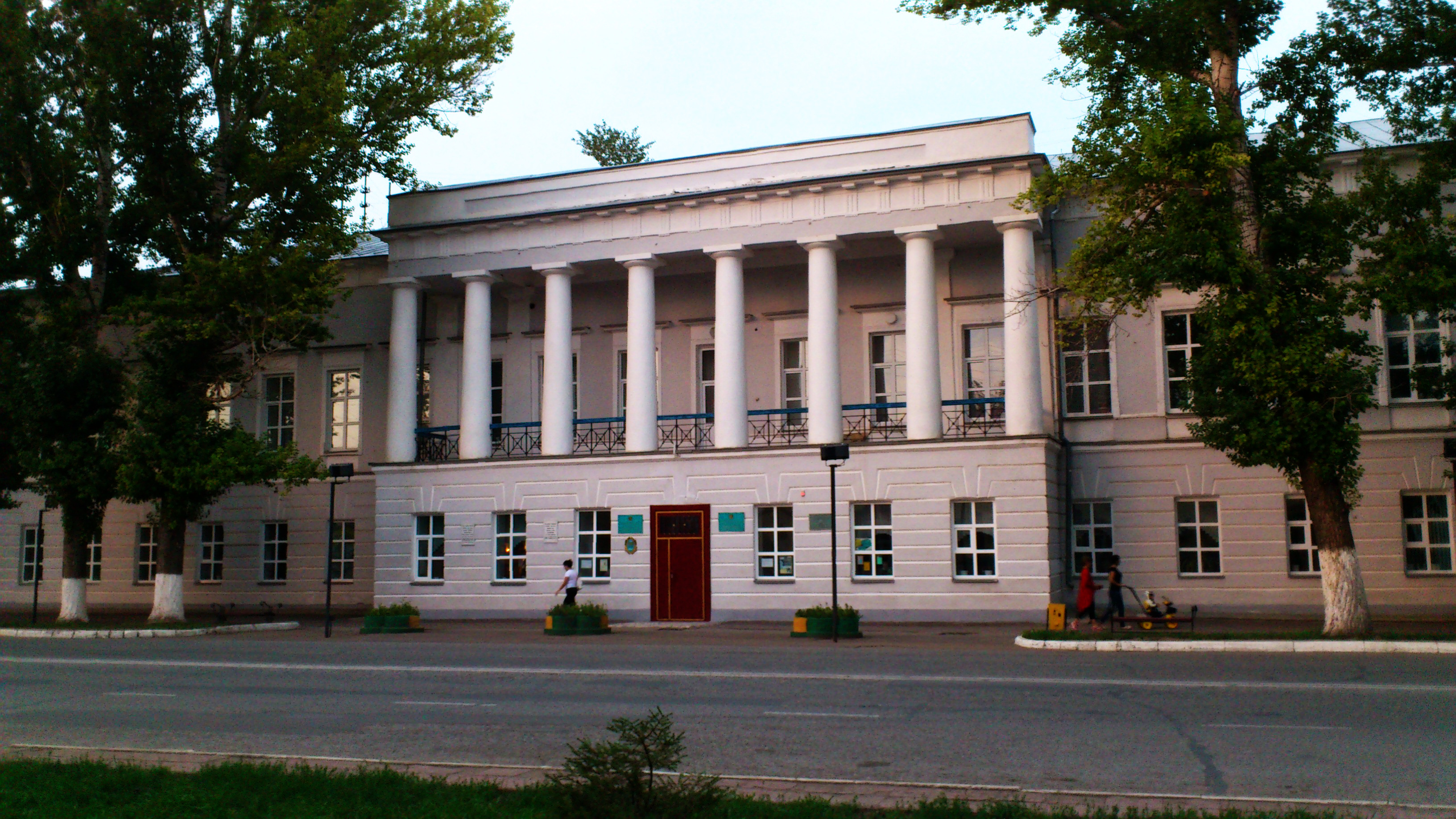
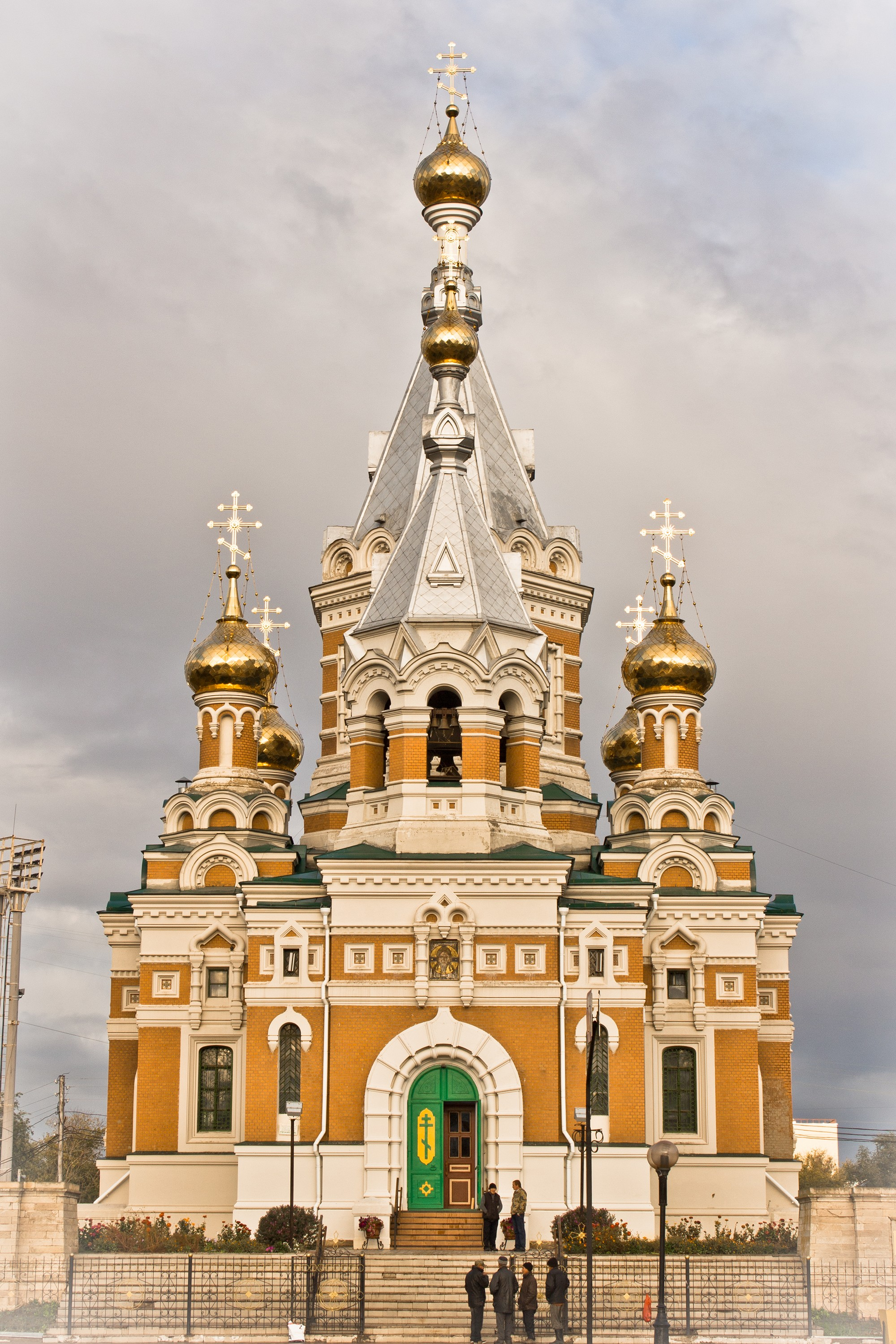
- West Kazakhstan State University Regional administration Local History Museum Library Salvator church

- Seal
- Interactive map of Oral
- Location in Kazakhstan Location in Europe
- Coordinates: 51°13′21″N 51°22′21″E
- Country: Kazakhstan
- Region: West Kazakhstan Region
- Founded: 1584
- Incorporated (city): 1613

Government
  - Akim (mayor): Murat Baimenov

Area
  - City: 700 km^{2} (270 sq mi)
- Elevation: 35 m (115 ft)

Population (2019)
  - City: 330,000
  - Density: 470/km^{2} (1,200/sq mi)
  - Urban: 234,184
- Time zone: UTC+5 (UTC+5)
- Postal code: 090000 - 090013
- Area code: +7 7112
- Vehicle registration: L, 07
- Website: uralsk.gov.kz/en/

Oral (woah-RAL; Kazakh: Орал, pronounced [woˈrɑɫ]), also known as Uralsk (Russian: Уральск, IPA: [ʊˈralʲsk]), is a city in northwestern Kazakhstan and Eastern Europe at the confluence of the Ural and Chagan rivers close to the Russian border. Oral is considered geographically in Europe as it is located on the western bank of the Ural river. It is the capital of the West Kazakhstan Region.

== Demographics ==
The ethnic composition is majority Kazakh (71%), followed by the second-largest ethnic group Russians (25%). Population: 271,900 (2009 census results); 194,905 (1999 census results).

== Sport ==
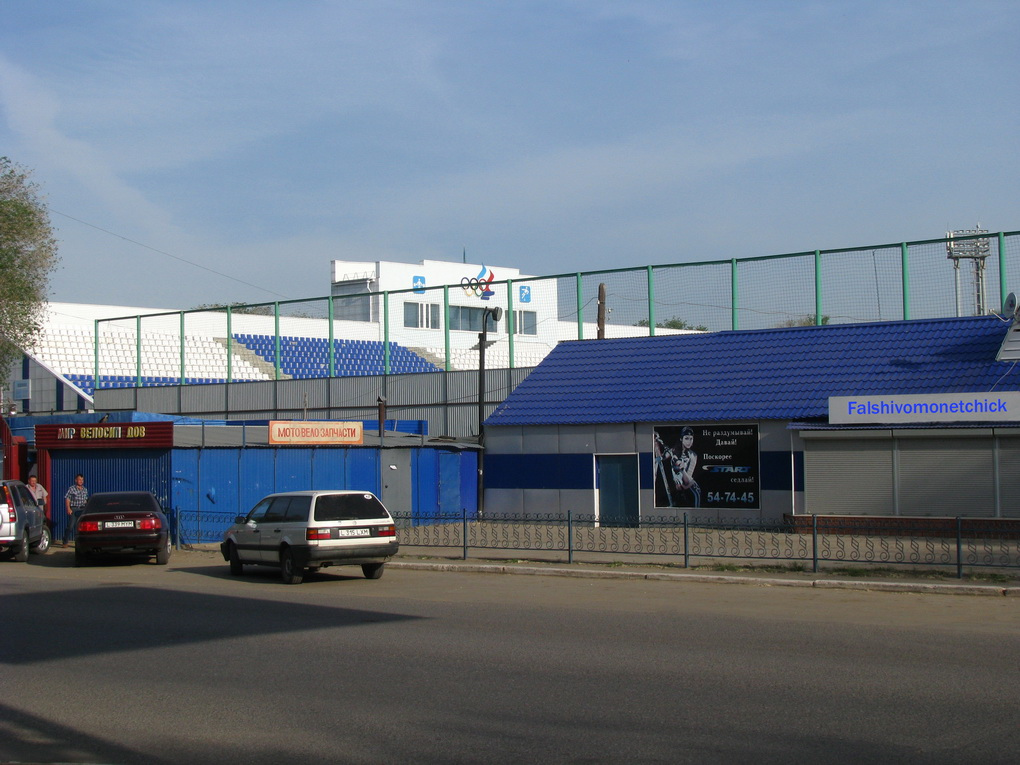
Petr Atoyan Stadium

FC Akzhayik are a Kazakhstani football club based in Petr Atoyan Stadium.

Bandy is the principal sport in the city. Akzhayik Sports Club, based in the Yunost Stadium, is the only professional team in the country and plays in the second highest division of Russia. In September 2017, the Kazakhstan Bandy Federation bought the club.

The city sent a team to the Spartakiade 2009 and the finished second. All the players of the Under-23 national team in the 2013–14 season came from Oral. After the Kazakhstan national bandy team took the gold medal at the 2011 Asian Winter Games, the team came back to Oral in triumph.

Oral is an agricultural and industrial centre and has been an important trade stop since its founding. Barge traffic has passed up and down the Ural river between the Caspian Sea and the Ural Mountains for centuries. Today it is one of the major entry points for rail traffic from Europe to Siberia, servicing the many new oil fields in the Caspian basin and the industrial cities of the southern Urals. It is served by Oral Ak Zhol Airport.

== History ==
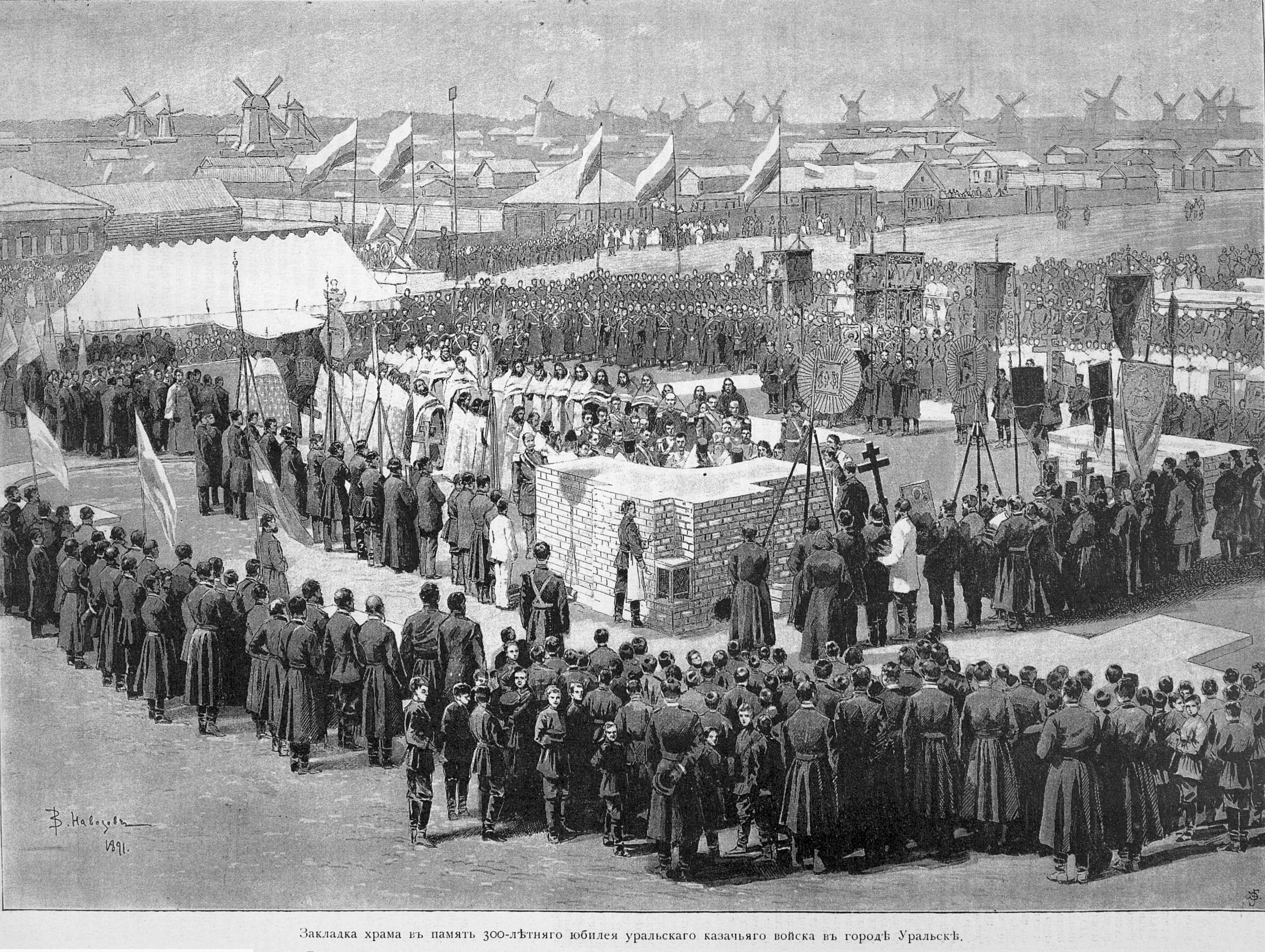
Church of Christ the Saviour in Oral, placing the first stone in 1891

Oral was founded in 1613 by Cossacks, and was originally named Yaitsk, after the Yaik river, the name of the Ural river at the time. In 1773 there occurred the first Cossack rebellion against the local Russian commander General Traubenberg, led by Yemelyan Pugachev. Traubenberg was murdered along with several other officers.

The city was captured by Pugachev, and its fortress besieged from 30 December 1773 to 17 April 1774. Tsarist troops under Commander Mantsurov re took the city after Golytsin had taken the city of Orenburg from the rebel forces.

As a punishment for the Yaik Cossacks siding with the insurrectionists, Empress Catherine II declared on 15 January 1775 that the Yaik river would henceforth be renamed the Ural River and Yaitsk would be known as Ural'sk.

Alexander Pushkin visited the city with his friend Vladimir Dahl in September 1833 while doing research for his book The History of Pugachev (1834) and his novel The Captain's Daughter.

The city was under siege imposed by Cossacks during the Russian Civil War from 1917 to 1922. Mikhail Frunze, Vasily Chapaev and Georgy Zhukov participated in its defence.

After the independence of Kazakhstan in 1991, Ural'sk was renamed as Oral.

== Geography ==
=== Climate ===
The climate of Oral (Uralsk) is humid continental climate (Köppen climate classification: Dfa, Trewartha Dcac) with long cold winters and warm, often hot summers. Summers are extremely hot considering its position north of the 51st parallel, but winters are more reminiscent of continental climates further east than Europe.

Climate data for Oral (1991–2020, extremes 1839–present)
Month	Jan	Feb	Mar	Apr	May	Jun	Jul	Aug	Sep	Oct	Nov	Dec	Year
Record high °C (°F)	6.6 (43.9)	6.9 (44.4)	22.1 (71.8)	31.1 (88.0)	37.8 (100.0)	41.8 (107.2)	42.0 (107.6)	42.3 (108.1)	38.8 (101.8)	28.0 (82.4)	18.0 (64.4)	8.2 (46.8)	42.3 (108.1)
Mean daily maximum °C (°F)	−6.7 (19.9)	−5.9 (21.4)	1.2 (34.2)	14.7 (58.5)	23.2 (73.8)	28.1 (82.6)	30.2 (86.4)	29.0 (84.2)	21.9 (71.4)	12.5 (54.5)	2.1 (35.8)	−4.7 (23.5)	12.1 (53.8)
Daily mean °C (°F)	−10.4 (13.3)	−10.3 (13.5)	−3.3 (26.1)	8.3 (46.9)	16.3 (61.3)	21.1 (70.0)	23.2 (73.8)	21.5 (70.7)	14.6 (58.3)	6.7 (44.1)	−1.6 (29.1)	−8.2 (17.2)	6.5 (43.7)
Mean daily minimum °C (°F)	−14.1 (6.6)	−14.5 (5.9)	−7.4 (18.7)	2.6 (36.7)	9.3 (48.7)	13.9 (57.0)	16.0 (60.8)	14.2 (57.6)	8.3 (46.9)	2.1 (35.8)	−4.7 (23.5)	−11.6 (11.1)	1.2 (34.2)
Record low °C (°F)	−43.1 (−45.6)	−40.5 (−40.9)	−35.2 (−31.4)	−24.3 (−11.7)	−6.8 (19.8)	−1.1 (30.0)	4.3 (39.7)	0.4 (32.7)	−7.6 (18.3)	−19.2 (−2.6)	−32.6 (−26.7)	−39.2 (−38.6)	−43.1 (−45.6)
Average precipitation mm (inches)	25.2 (0.99)	20.8 (0.82)	25.0 (0.98)	24.2 (0.95)	31.4 (1.24)	32.0 (1.26)	38.9 (1.53)	22.2 (0.87)	27.4 (1.08)	37.1 (1.46)	26.8 (1.06)	27.0 (1.06)	338 (13.3)
Average extreme snow depth cm (inches)	20 (7.9)	29 (11)	23 (9.1)	2 (0.8)	0 (0)	0 (0)	0 (0)	0 (0)	0 (0)	0 (0)	3 (1.2)	10 (3.9)	29 (11)
Average rainy days	5	4	6	9	10	11	10	9	10	12	10	7	103
Average snowy days	20	16	10	2	0.2	0	0	0	0.1	3	11	18	80
Average relative humidity (%)	83	81	81	65	55	57	58	57	61	73	83	83	70
Mean monthly sunshine hours	84	120	165	227	314	304	324	293	220	136	64	65	2,316
Mean daily sunshine hours	2.7	4.3	5.3	7.6	10.1	10.1	10.5	9.5	7.3	4.4	2.1	2.1	6.3
Source 1: Pogoda.ru.net
Source 2: NOAA (sun, 1961–1990), Deutscher Wetterdienst (daily sun 1961-1990)

== Transportation ==
=== Air ===
The city is served by the Mänşük Mämetova Oral International Airport located 12 km (7 mi) southeast of Oral.

== Notable people ==
=== Arts, literature, and entertainment ===
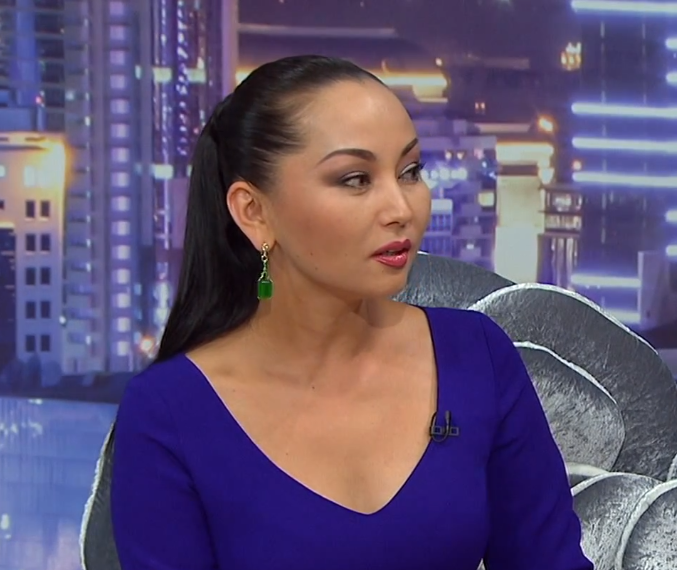
Bayan Maksatkyzy, 2015

- Bayan Maksatkyzy (1974), a Kazakh producer, television presenter, actress, and singer.
