= Bayan Yessentayeva =

Kazakhstani singer, and television presenter (born 1974)

Bayan Alaguzova
- Bayanchik in 2015 (Astana TV)
- Born: 9 January 1974 (age 52); Uralsk, Kazakh SSR, USSR (now Oral, Kazakhstan)
- Occupations: Producer, actress, TV presenter, singer
- Spouse: Tursungali Alaguzov
- Children: 4

Bayan Maksatkyzy Alaguzova (née Mukhitdenova; (Kazakh: Баян Мақсатқызы Алагузова (Мұхитденова), Baian Maqsatqyzy Alaguzova (Mūhitdenova); born 9 January 1974,) is a Kazakhstani producer, television presenter, actress, and singer. She first rose to fame in 1993 with her leading role in the melodrama "Station of Love" (ru. Станция любви), after which she worked for a long time as a journalist and presenter on television. Since 2006, she has been producing Kazakh musical group KeshYOU and individual performers Zhanar Dugalova and Yerke Esmahan. Since 2010, she has appeared in several films and television series.

== Biography ==
=== Childhood and youth ===
Bayan Mukhitdenova was born on 9 January 1974, in the city of Oral in the family of sound engineer Maksat Zailagievich Mukhitdenov and actress Gulzhamal Aidarovna Mukhitdenova. She comes from the genus Mascar of the Bayuly tribe of the Junior zhuz. According to her, she "dreamed of becoming an artist since childhood," but her mother was against it and wanted her to become a teacher. Bayan entered the Pedagogical Institute, but after three years of study, in secret from her parents, she transferred to the Faculty of cinema

=== First fame and career in journalism ===
The first fame came in 1993, when the film "Station of Love" (kaz. Mahabbat beketi), where Mukhitdinova played the beloved of the main character. After the first success, a long period of oblivion followed. In 1994, at the age of 20 Bayan Mukhitdenova married Bakhytbek Yesentayev and took his surname.

After graduating from the Faculty of Television Journalism of KazGU, Bayan got a job as a news journalist and worked for 7 years until she opened her own television program "Yellow Salon" on the Tan TV channel. After the closure of the Tan channel, Bayan was the host of the program "On the Hairpin" on the NTK TV channel for two years.

=== Career as a producer ===
In 2006, Bayan Alaguzova became the producer of the KeshYou group. Other similar projects followed. Being a laureate of the competitions "Zhas Kanat" and "Voice of Asia", Bayan recorded two songs in 2008 — "ABC of Love" and "Shine". In addition, she was for some time the editor-in-chief of the magazines Collection and "Gashyktar Alemi". In 2010, Bayan Alaguzova’s company Shine Production made the film "Cocktail for a Star", where she played one of the roles. In 2011, a sequel to this film was shot — "Cocktail for a star 2".

In 2013, Bayan Alaguzova played the main role in the film "Beware, cow!". In 2014, the Kazak Aruy project was launched, the Lashyn group appeared, its ward Zhanar Dugalova won the Turkvision Song Contest, the series Makhabbaty Zhүregіmde was released, together with Eric Tastambekov, the Cafe Central coffee shop was opened. At the end of 2014, she took the 21st place (30th place in 2013) in the list of "50 most influential women of Kazakhstan" according to the publication "Power".

At the end of 2015, Bayan Alaguzova announced her intentions to relocate her projects from Alma-Ata to Astana, where the Shine Hall creative center with a mini-theater, a children's creative center and a recording studio should open in September 2016.

In May 2016, it became known that Bayan Esentayeva will play one of the roles in the film directed by Askar Uzakbayev "Glamour for fools". Filming was supposed to begin on 26 May and last a month, and the premiere of the film is scheduled for autumn.

On 25 December 2017, the television series "Kozy Korpesh-Bayan Sulu" came out, the producer of which was Bayan Alaguzova, who was filmed in a picturesque place of the Almaty region – on the Assy plate of Enbekshikazakh district and in Almaty. An open letter was published on Qazaquni.kz, demanding to remove the television series "Kozy Korpesh – Bayan Sulu" from the national TV channel. Viewers did not like the inconsistencies in the film, as well as the fact that there was no casting for the role of the main character. The management of Qazaqstan TV channel was forced to make a promise not to repeat the series on the air.

On 7 March 2018, producer Bayan Alaguzova presented a film called "Sisitai", directed by Ernar Nurgaliyev. And Bayan played one of the main roles in it – the infamous producer Alice Maksutovna.

=== Incident with her husband ===
On 10 June 2016, Yesentayeva, along with her husband Bakhytbek Yesentayev and his nephew, left Almaty by car. During the trip, Yesentayeva's husband, who was intoxicated, began beating his wife. On the way, Bakhytbek Yesentayev dropped off his nephew, who was driving a car, at one of the gas stations and continued to beat Bayan, stabbed her four times. Esentayeva's daughter, who arrived at the scene, managed to stop her father and took her to the Talgar district hospital with a closed craniocerebral injury, paraorbital hematoma, penetrating knife wound of the abdominal cavity with through injuries of the large and small intestines, retroperitoneal space. According to the lawyer Bakhytbek Yesentayev, the conflict occurred on the grounds of jealousy, the husband intended to keep Yesentayeva in the family in this way. A year before the incident, Bayan Esentayeva described her husband as a loving but very jealous man, and called the first ten years of marriage "war".

After the detention of Bakhytbek Yesentayev, the judge appointed him a preventive measure in the form of detention for 2 months (until 10 August), a pre—trial investigation was launched against him under Article 106 of the Criminal Code of the Republic of Kazakhstan — "Intentional infliction of serious harm to health", then the case of Yesentayev was reclassified to Article 99, part 1 of the Criminal Code of the Republic of Kazakhstan – "Attempted murder." The case was transferred to the specialized criminal court of the Almaty region. The trial took place in the city of Kaskelen in a closed mode.

4 months after the incident, Bayan Alaguzova, through her representative in court, announced that she had forgiven her husband. She asked to mitigate his punishment and not to deprive Bakhytbek Yesentayev of his freedom. Despite this, on 3 November 2016, the specialized interdistrict Criminal Court of the Almaty region sentenced Bayan’s ex husband to 9 years in a high-security colony under Article 99 of Part 1 of the Criminal Code of the Republic of Kazakhstan "Attempted murder". According to the other two articles — "Violent acts of a sexual nature" and "Rape", Bakhytbek Yesentayev was acquitted, since the sperm sample taken from the victim Yesentayeva according to the results of molecular genetic examination belonged to another man. The verdict was announced behind closed doors, Bayan herself was not present at the trial. On 12 July 2022, the Kapshagai City Court granted Bakhytbek Yesentayev's request for parole.

=== Second marriage ===
On 22 January 2017, Bayan Alaguzova announced that she had "accepted a marriage proposal" from a well-known businessman, Tursengali Alaguzov (kaz. Tursyngali Alagozov), a businessman who is the owner and chairman of the board of directors of JSC GALANZ Bottlers. Earlier, the Kazakh press had already published rumors about the love relationship between Esentayeva and Alaguzov.

On 7 December 2017, Bayan Alaguzova and Tursengali Alaguzov registered their marriage. In 2024, Tursengali Alaguzov acquired the Shymkent Brewery, and in 2025 he acquired LLP JFood Kazakhstan.

== Financial condition ==
In 2013–2015, Bayan Alaguzova was consistently among the top five stars of show business and sports according to Forbes Kazakhstan. According to experts, in 2013 she earned 480 thousand US dollars, in 2014 — 850 thousand dollars, and in 2015 — 1 million dollars. In total, her company Shine Production produces seven musical projects.

== Family ==
Bayan has two daughters from her marriage to Bakhytbek Yesentayev — Aisaule and Ayaru. Aisaule Bakhytbek was born on 22 May 1996, Ayaru Bakhytbek was born on 19 December 2003. From her second marriage, Bayan has two daughters — Alisa (born 4 August 2024) and Alma (born 19 August 2024), both born via a surrogate mother.

== Awards ==
- 2021 (2 December) — Jubilee medal "30 years of Independence of the Republic of Kazakhstan";
- 2022 (17 March) — By Decree of the President of the Republic of Kazakhstan, she was awarded the Medal for Distinguished Labor
