= Qazaqstan (TV channel) =

Kazakhstani national television broadcaster

- Country: Kazakhstan
- Broadcast area: Kazakhstan; Worldwide (via IPTV)
- Headquarters: Astana, Kazakhstan

Programming
- Languages: Kazakh; Russian (until 2011)
- Picture format: 16:9

Ownership
- Owner: Qazaqstan Radio and Television Corporation
- Sister channels: Balapan, Qazsport

History
- Launched: 8 March 1958; 68 years ago
- Former names: Almaty Television Studio (1958–1960s); Kazakh Television (1960s–1991); Kazakhstan 1 (1991–2002); Kazakhstan (2002–2017)

Links
- Website: qazaqstan.tv

Availability

Terrestrial
- Digital terrestrial television: Channel 1

Streaming media
- Live broadcast: qazaqstan.tv

Qazaqstan, (styled in all caps), is a Kazakh state and international television broadcaster which began broadcasting on 8 March 1958. It is a part of the Qazaqstan Radio and Television Corporation. The station broadcasts around the clock in the Kazakh language.

The TV channel is broadcasting from Astana (from 1 December 2012, broadcasts have been moved into a new media center QazMedia Ortalygy in Astana) and Alma-Ata and has a regional network of branches in all regions of Kazakhstan. Its program schedule consists of information, educational programs, films and TV series in the Kazakh language. In the regions, the channel has different names (Kazakhstan Taraz, Kazakhstan – Friendly, etc. ), as local broadcast network affiliates controlled by Qazaqstan Radio and Television Corporation.

Qazaqstan TV is also available in homes throughout Russia, Kyrgyzstan, Uzbekistan, Mongolia and China.

== History ==
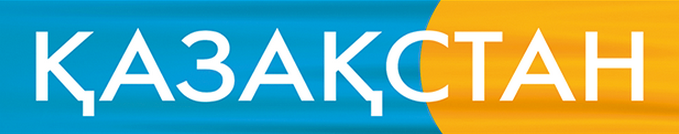
Former channel logo (2014–15)

The first national television channel in Kazakhstan aired for the first time in 1958. The first center in Alma-Ata opened in April of that year, followed by Ust-Kameogorsk in July and Karaganda in October. At the time broadcasting was limited to five hours a day. By 1987 Kazakhstan was ranked fourth among all Soviet republics by the amount of broadcasting, and second by the number of feature films and documentaries produced.

Qazaqstan TV used to operate two national channels: Kazakhstan-1 (since 2017, Qazaqstan) and Kazakhstan-2. The latter channel was later renamed Alatau in 1992 before being replaced by Khabar TV in 1995.

Since September 2011 the channel broadcasts exclusively in Kazakh language. Prior to that both Kazakh and Russian languages were used.

In December 2021, Qazaqstan TV presented several new historical TV series in honor of the 30th anniversary of the independence of Kazakhstan. These series include: Zhangir khan. Saray syry, Akhmet. Ult Ustazy, Domalaq Ana, Tashenev. Taitalas, Kanysh. Kazyna and Mukagali. Bul gassyrdan emespin

== Broadcasts ==
- Tungі studiyada Nurlan Qoyanbaevpen
- Aqparat
- Halyq tandauy
- Tansholpan
- Jaidarman
- Rijasyz angіme
- Orleu. Astana
- Ozekjardy
- Orleu. Jana Qazaqstan
- Janalyqtar
- Apta.kz
- Arnajy reportazh
- Enselі Elorda
- Qylmys pen jaza
- Syr suhbat
- Jan Jyluy
- Kokpar
- Tolagai
- Sport.kz
- Aq sauyt
- Alan
- Sonbes saule
- Kesh jaryq
- Ajgolek
- Soz mergen
- Iman ajnasy
- Juzden Juirіk
- Damu
- Daua
- Altyn taga
- Andapta
- Aituga onai

== Regional channels ==
=== Kókshe ===
Akmola regional branch of "Kazakhstan" RTRC was founded on September 21, 1999, after the transfer of the administrative center of Astana Akmola region Kokshetau. The TV channel aired for the first time on October 4, 1999.

Some of the popular broadcasts include Tanymal, Myñ bır söz Natal’i Dement’evoi, Sağynyş, Gakku Asylbekkyzy, Mektep TV, Dany Abdrahmanovoi i Korganbeka Konysbaiuly, Toçka zreniia, Vopreki vsemu, Razy Mantaevoi, "Qoğam jäne dın" Serika Jetpiskalieva, "Press Room" Aynagwl’ Temirzanovoy, "Jigerı jasymağandar" Makpal Aybabïnoy.

=== Aqtóbe ===
Aktobe regional branch of Qazaqstan Radio and Television Corporation started broadcasting on 28 October 1960. The TV channel broadcasts in the city of Aktobe, as well as in nearby settlements within 40 kilometres (25 mi) from the city. Broadcasts are aired 14 hours a day.

=== Atyraý ===
Atyrau regional branch of Qazaqstan broadcasts in the city of Atyrau, as well as in nearby settlements. Total weekly broadcast time is 119 hours. It includes 80 hours of broadcasts in Kazakh language, which is 68% of the total broadcasting. Original broadcasts account for 45 hours a week, or 38% of total broadcasting.

=== Altaı ===
Oskemen regional branch of Qazaqstan started broadcasting on 16 March 1958. The first broadcast was called Salyut Pobedy (Russian: Салют Победы, lit. 'Salute of Victory'). Starting from 1959 the TV channel started producing original movies and series. Some of the more successful movies include: Na medvyedya (Russian: На медведя) – awarded at the Monte-Karl International Film Festival; Ozero studenoe i laskovoe, Starik i ozero, and Postizhenie.

=== Jambyl ===
Zhambyl regional branch of RTRC "Kazakhstan" broadcasts in the city of Zhambyl, as well as in nearby settlements. During the Soviet era broadcasts were limited to an hour per week. After the collapse of the Soviet Union in 1991, the broadcast duration increased. Today total weekly broadcast time is 98 hours. The channel produces about 30 original shows and broadcasts.

=== Aqjaıyq ===
The first transmission of West Kazakhstan regional branch aired 26 September 1964. First broadcasts were limited to three to four hours a day. The channel transferred to digital format in 2003. Total weekly broadcast time today is 98 hours. Some of the popular original broadcasts are El aldynda, Vremya vašego voprosa, Barekeldі, Arnaiy reportazh, Drugoy Uralsk, and Zhenskie sekrety.

=== Saryarqa ===
Karaganda regional branch of Qazaqstan started broadcasting on 31 August 1958. The channel is also producing original movies and series. Some of the more successful original broadcasts include: the movie Arqanın merwert aynası (Kazakh: Арқаның меруерт айнасы) – awarded at the Silk Way International Film Festival, documentaries Kök adırda köp belgi kupïyalı (Kazakh: Көк адырда көп белгі кұпиялы) and Ulıtawdın uları joq (Kazakh: Ұлытаудың ұлары жоқ).

=== Qostanaı ===
The first transmission of Kostanay regional branch aired 1 February 1991. Chairmen N. Islyamiev and B. Nurmuhanbetov, chief engineer V. Astashov, and editor in chief A. Madin are regarded as founders of the branch.

=== Qyzylorda ===
Kyzylorda regional branch of Qazaqstan was founded in 1991. First test broadcast was aired 30 April 1991. The next day first live broadcast was aired. Jaqsylyq Bekqodjaev was the first executive of the branch. During the first 10 years broadcasts were limited to 10 hours a day. As of 2014 broadcasting time increased to 14 hours per day.

=== Mańǵystaý ===
Aqtau regional branch celebrated its 40th anniversary on 15 August 2010. The staff of the TV channel consists of about 100 employees. Broadcasts are limited to 14 hours a day. The estimated audience is 500 000 viewers. The TV channel produces 29 original broadcasts.

=== Ertis ===
Pavlodar regional branch of Qazaqstan started broadcasting on 7 November 1965. Until 1966, the TV channel only broadcast for a limited time, twice a week. In 1979, the TV channel started partly broadcasting in color.

=== Qyzyljar ===
The first transmission of North Kazakhstan regional branch aired in June 1960. In 1967 the first original movie Gorkaya linia (Russian: Горькая линия) was filmed and aired. In 1982 the TV channel started partly broadcasting in color. Presently, the Qazaqstan-Petropavl broadcasts 17 hours a day.

=== Semey ===
Semey regional branch of Qazaqstan was founded in 1965. On September 1 of that same year, the first broadcast was aired in Semey. At the time it was only the fourth regional branch of Qazaqstan in the country. The first head of the Committee for Television and Radio in Semey were World War II veterans Kilchikbay Bayguzhin and Serjan Ramazanov. Today, the popular broadcasts of the TV channel include: Qayirlu tan, Shakarim tagylymy, Prityazhenie, and Vershina.

=== Ońtústik ===
Shymkent regional branch of Qazaqstan was founded in 1990. On October 5 of the same year, local news was aired for the first time. Today, the broadcasting time of Kazakhstan-Shymkent is limited to 14 hours a day.
