= Qazaqstan Radio and Television Corporation =

Kazakhstan media company

- Type: Statutory corporation
- Industry: Mass media
- Founded: 8 March 1958
- Headquarters: QazMedia Ortalygy, Astana
- Area served: Kazakhstan
- Key people: Lyazzat Tanysbay
- Products: Broadcasting, radio, web portals
- Owner: Government of Kazakhstan
- Website: rtrk.kz

Qazaqstan Radio and Television Corporation (Kazakh: «Qazaqstan» Республикалық Телерадиокорпорациясы Акционерлік Қоғамы, romanized: «Qazaqstan» Respublikalyq Teleradiokorporatsiasy Aktsionerlık Qoğamy, «Қазақстан» РТРК» АҚ, «Qazaqstan» RTRK AQ) is one of the largest media companies in Kazakhstan. It runs four TV channels: Qazaqstan, Qazsport, Balapan, Abai TV; and four radio stations: Qazaq Radiosy, Shalkar, Astana, and Classic. There are also 14 regional TV channels that are part of the corporation.

== History ==
Kazakh radiosy, which debuted in 1922, was the nation of Kazakhstan's first radio station. In 1958, the first TV station began to air. Later, these two channels and radio stations joined the Kazakhstan Radio and Television Corporation, along with a number of others.

Qazaqstan Radio and Television Corporation is owned by the state of Kazakhstan. The broadcasts of the TV and radio stations within the corporation are available to 99 percent of the population as well as to the residents of neighboring countries (Russia, Mongolia, China, Kyrgyzstan, and Uzbekistan).

== Managers ==
1. Qanapïya Mustafïn – 1956–1957: Head of the Radio information department of the Ministry of Culture of the Kazakh SSR. 1957–1959: Chairman of the Committee of Radio and Television broadcasts under the Council of Ministers of the Kazakh SSR.
2. Qurmanbek Sağındıqov – 1959–1962: Chairman of the Committee of Radio and Television broadcasts under the Council of Ministers of the Kazakh SSR.
3. Kenjebolat Şalabayev – 1962–1969: Chairman of the Committee of Radio and Television broadcasts under the Council of Ministers of the Kazakh SSR.
4. Keñesbay Üsebayulı Üsebayev – 1969–1975: Chairman of the Committee of Radio and Television broadcasts under the Council of Ministers of the Kazakh SSR.
5. Xamït Xasenulı Xasenov – 1975–1978: Chairman of the Committee of Radio and Television broadcasts under the Council of Ministers of the Kazakh. 1978–1983: Chairman of the Committee of Radio and Television broadcasts.
6. Kamal Seyitjanulı Smayılov – 1983–1986: Chairman of the Committee of Radio and Television broadcasts.
7. Ğadilbek Minäjulı Şalaxmetov – 1986–1990: Chairman of the Committee of Radio and Television broadcasts.
8. Sağat Äşimbayulı Äşimbayev – 1990–1991: Chairman of the Committee of Radio and Television broadcasts.
9. Ğadilbek Minäjulı Şalaxmetov – 1991–1992: Chairman of the Committee of Radio and Television broadcasts.
10. Şerxan Murtaza – 1992–1994: Chairman of Kazakhstan state television and radio broadcasting company.
11. Leyla Qalïbekqızı Beketova – 1994–1995: President of "Kazakhstannyn teledidary men radiosy" corporation.
12. Äşirbek Seyilxanulı Köpişev – 1995–1996: President of "Kazakhstannyn teledidary men radiosy" corporation CJSC.
13. Erlan Äbenulı Satıbaldïyev – 1996–2001: President of "Kazakhstannyn teledidary men radiosy" corporation CJSC.
14. Esetjan Muratulı Qoswbayev – 2001–2002: Head of "Kazakhstannyn teledidary men radiosy" corporation CJSC.
15. Ğalım Tölembekulı Dosken – 2002: Head of "Kazakhstannyn teledidary men radiosy" corporation CJSC. 2003–2004: Head of Kazakhstan Radio and Television Corporation CJSC. 2004–2006: Head of Qazaqstan Radio and Television Corporation JSC.
16. Nurtilew Ïmanğalïulı Ïmanğalïyev – 2006–2007: Head of Qazaqstan Radio and Television Corporation JSC.
17. Däwren Serikulı Äbdixamïtov – 2007–2008: Head of Qazaqstan Radio and Television Corporation JSC.
18. Janay Seyitjanulı Omarov – 2008–2011: Head of Qazaqstan Radio and Television Corporation JSC.
19. Nurzhan Zhalaukyzy Muhamedzhanova – 2011–2016: Head of Qazaqstan Radio and Television Corporation JSC.
20. Kemelbek Oishybayev – 2016–2017: Head of Qazaqstan Radio and Television Corporation JSC.
21. Erlan Karin – 2017–2019: Head of Qazaqstan Radio and Television Corporation JSC.
22. Lyazzat Tanysbay – (current): Head of Qazaqstan Radio and Television Corporation JSC.

== Assets ==
=== Television channels ===
==== Kazakhstan ====
Qazaqstan is the first national TV channel in Kazakhstan. The first broadcast was made in 1958. It is also an international broadcaster. Today, Qazaqstan is the largest media resource of the country, with broadcasts available for 98.63% of the local and international population. From 1 September 2011, Qazaqstan broadcast exclusively in the Kazakh language. From 2012, broadcasts are available in HD.

==== Balapan ====
Children's TV channel, Balapan, began broadcasting on 27 September 2010. It is the first children's television channel in Kazakhstan. It is the only children's television channel in the world to be also an international broadcaster. Broadcasts are available in HD on cable networks and also online via the official website of Balapan channel.

==== Qazsport ====
Qazsport is the first sports channel in Kazakhstan. It has greatly improved the availability of sports broadcasts for Kazakh audiences. It was officially launched on 1 July 2013.

==== Abai TV ====
The TV channel "Abai TV" went on the air in 2020. Its opening is timed to the 175th anniversary of the great Kazakh educator and poet Abai Qunanbaiuly. The Abai channel became the first niche cultural TV channel in Kazakhstan. Its main task is to promote and popularize the achievements of Kazakh culture. The TV channel broadcasts popular documentaries telling about the pearls of national and world art, masterpieces of literary and historical heritage of different peoples. The TV channel constantly shows premiere productions of Kazakhstani theaters, tells about famous figures of culture and art of Kazakhstan. The line of programs presented on the air of the Abai channel is designed for viewers of different age and social strata.

=== Radio stations ===
==== Qazaq Radiosy ====
On 29 September 1921, the Soviet government decided to establish state broadcasting in Kazakhstan. In October 1921, broadcasts began from Orenburg (Kazakhstan's capital at that time). On 23 March 1927, Kazakh language was aired on radio for the first time. Today, Qazaq Radiosy is the largest broadcasting network of the country. Broadcasts are available in Kazakh, Russian, German, Korean, Uyghur, Azerbaijani, Turkish, and Tatar languages.

==== Radio Shalqar ====
Radio Shalqar is a structural unit of Qazaq Radiosy, which broadcasts only in Kazakh. Broadcasting time is 18 hours per day.

==== Radio Astana ====
Radio Astana is an information-musical radio station. The station began broadcasting on 19 January 1999, on 101.4 FM.

==== Radio Classic ====
Radio Classic is the first classical music radio station in Kazakhstan. It is a joint media project of the corporation and the Kurmangazy Kazakh National Conservatory. The station started broadcasting on 102.8 FM, on 6 June 2011.
