= Urzhar (river) =

River in Kazakhstan

Ürjar Уржар
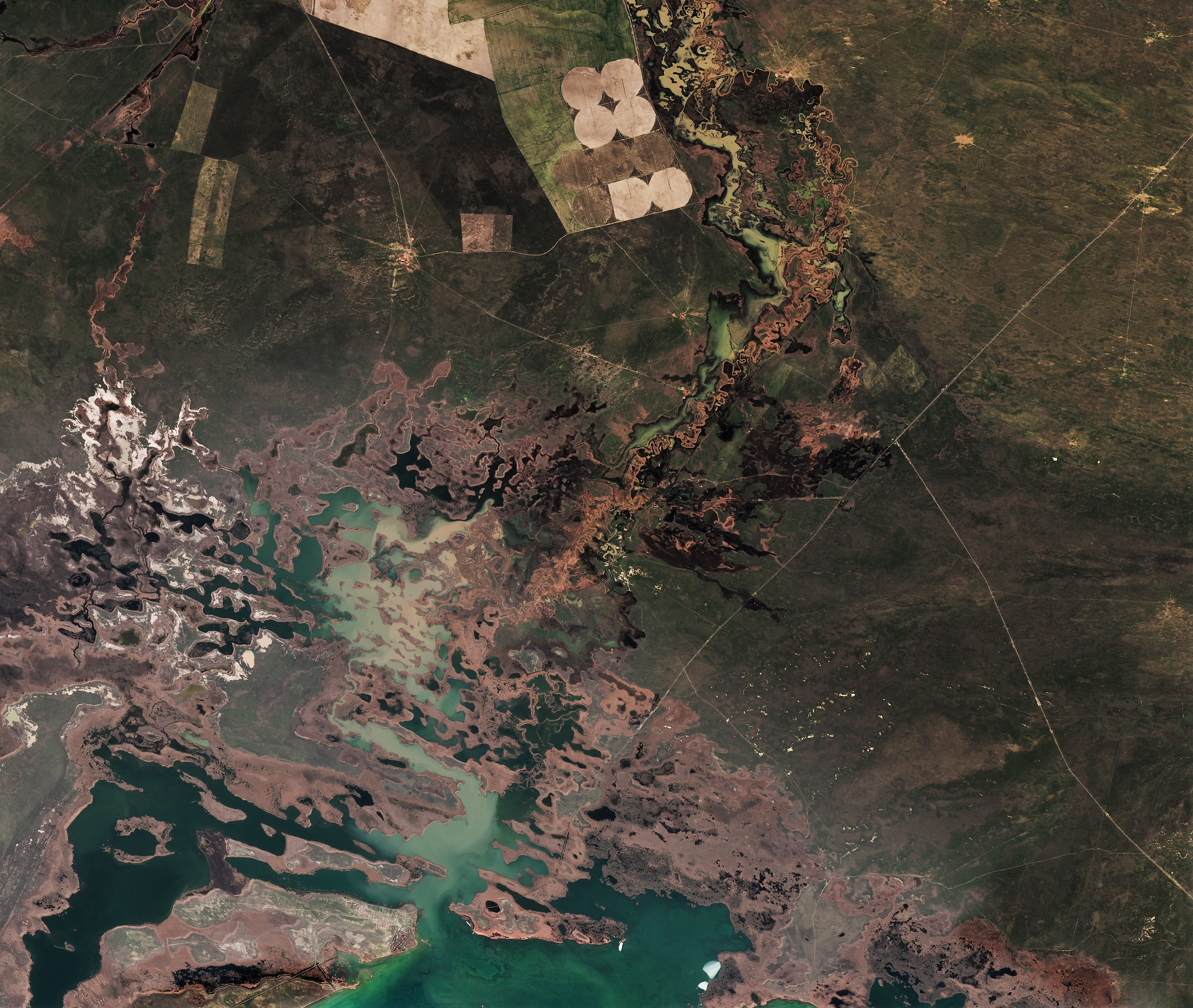
- Last stretch and mouth of the Ürjar river Sentinel-2 image.

- Mouth location in Kazakhstan

Location
- Country: Kazakhstan

Physical characteristics
- Source: Tarbagatai Range
  - coordinates: 47°23′22″N 81°30′52″E
  - elevation: 2,040 m (6,690 ft)
- Mouth: Balkhash-Alakol Basin
  - location: Lake Alakol
  - coordinates: 46°28′0″N 81°33′08″E
  - elevation: 348 m (1,142 ft)
- Length: 206 km (128 mi)
- Basin size: 5,280 km^{2} (2,040 sq mi)

The Ürjar (Kazakh: Уржар) is a river in the Abai Region, Kazakhstan. It has a length of 206 km (128 mi) and a drainage basin of 5,280 km^{2} (2,040 sq mi).

The river flows across Ürjar village, the administrative center of Ürjar District. It is one of the three most important rivers flowing into Alakol lake. Its waters are used to irrigate crops and pasture areas.

== Course ==
The Ürjar originates in the southern slopes of the western part of the Tarbagatai Range. It heads roughly southwards all along its course. In its upper section it flows as a typical mountain river within a narrow and deep valley with frequent rapids. After leaving the mountain area it enters the wide Balkhash-Alakol Basin and passes through the village of Ürjar. The speed of its current slows down, its channel widens and forms meanders. Further downstream it divides into arms. Finally it reaches the northern lakeshore of lake Alakol near Kamyskala, former Ribachy village.

The river is fed partly by snow and partly by groundwater. Its main tributaries are rivers Bazarka, Kusak and Karagaila on the left, and Eginsu on the right.

== See also ==
- List of rivers of Kazakhstan
