= Gakku TV =

- Country: Kazakhstan

Ownership
- Owner: "Musan Group" (100%)

History
- Launched: June 24, 2014
- Closed: March 1, 2025

Links
- Website: https://www.gakku.kz

Gakku TV (Kazakh: "Гәкку ТВ", "Gäkku TV"; Russian: «Гакку́ ТВ») was the first music channel in Kazakhstan that only aired content produced in Kazakhstan.

Gakku TV aimed to expand Kazakh music and culture and boost patriotism.

The channel aired on cable and satellite television all over the country.

Gakku TV produced short content, which consists of music programmes, news and entertainment in Kazakh and Russian.

Up to 400 best performances of musicians from the last 30 years were aired daily. The channel provided charge-free rotation of the whole music content.

== History ==
- On November 1, 2013, Gakku TV channel is founded by Sanzhar Mustafin, Kazakh producer and head of Musan Group.
- On September 8, 2014, the first newscast launched.
- First music video aired on Gakku TV was Otan Ana by Batyrkhan Shukenov
- On September 13, 2014, Gakku TV held its first annual Gakku Dausy (Voice of Gakku) music festival in Almaty dedicated to the launch of Gakku TV music channel. A total of 200 singers, 57 bands and 75 music concerted items performed on festival. Batyrkhan Shukenov was invited as a special guest of the event. Festival lasted 7 hours.
- On September 12, 2015, at Astana square in Almaty the second Gakku Dausy music festival launched. 55 performers of Kazakhstan participated the concert that lasted 6 hours. 40 thousand people visited the festival.
- On September 17, 2016, there was held the third Gakku Dausy music festival dedicated to 1 000th anniversary of Almaty. 90000 people attended the festival. This event was recognized as the biggest show in the history of Gakku Dausy festivals. Concert video uploaded to YouTube reached over 1 000 000 views.
- On May 18, 2016 in television first Gakku Auendery (Melodies of Gakku) awards ceremony was held at Kazakhstan Central Concert Hall in Astana. The event lasted 2,5 hours.
- On June 23, 2017, at EXPO-2017 concert hall in Astana there was held Sound of Gakku concert. It lasted 2 hours 40 minutes.
- On September 9, 2017, the fourth annual festival run in Oskemen.
- On September 16, 2017, the festival launched in Almaty. First headliner was Dimash Kudaibergen. The festival was live and lasted 6 hours. 150.000 people visited it.
- On September 22, 2017, Gakku Dausy was held in Aktau and coincided with the Town Day.
- On September 15, 2018, the fifth anniversary of Gakku Dausy took place on Almaty and it gathered a record-breaking audience about 200.000 people. The show was presented by kazakh producers Alua Konarova and Bayan Alaguzova and the representatives of Gakku TV channel Nurzhan Yerkinuly and Timur Balymbetov.
- On March 1, 2025, the TV channel stopped broadcasting due to the expiration of the contract with the copyright holder.
- The last music video aired on Gakku TV was Oblaka by URKER before shutting down.

== Programs (before March 1, 2025) ==
- Gakku NEWS – hourly show business, sports and fashion news.
- An-Gimme (Ән-Gimme) – live chat with celebrities.
- Derec – music videos with boxed captions about filming process.
- Backstage – behind the scenes of music videos.
- Gakku Top 10 – the only public music chart where newcomers and professionals compete for audience votes.
- Zhauap Ber – question/answer format conversation based on audience questions.
- Cool Tizbe (Сool Тізбе) – entertaining top-list of showbiz stars.
- Love Story – Kazakh celebrity couples love stories.
- Follow Wars – stars respond to social media comments.
- Instanews – discussion of stars' posts from Instagram.
- Tyńda – two representatives of show business compete at guessing right the singers and bands.
- KinoKorme – main events of kazakhstani movie industry.
- Follow Wars 2.0 – project re-start. Guests read comments on social networks while people from backstage force them to reply.
- Uyat-Parade S – Music video review with funny gags.
- Newton Tour 2018 – backstage of first tour of Newton music band all over Kazakhstan.

== Music video blocks ==
- #Jap-jana – fresh home-produced music broadcasts. Music video premieres aired with #tusaukeser hashtag.
- #Solo – three consecutive music videos by a single performer.
- #Ozgeler – collection of alternative music video. (rock, indie, folk, synth, etc.)
- #Yep-yeski – golden collection of old Kazakh music video.
- #Chak-chak – best new video collection.
- #Altynym-altynym – collection of music videos from last decade.
- #Hip-hop – video collection from best rappers of Kazakhstan.
- #Q-Pop – collection of music videos from the Q-Pop genre.
- #00-ŞY – collection of music videos from 2000s.
- #10-ŞY – collection of music videos from 2010s.

== Gakku FM ==
Gakku FM – Kazakh music radio station from Gakku TV producers. broadcasting with December 1, 2016 before March 1, 2025.

Gakku FM broadcasts only Kazakh content: contemporary music and hot show business, culture and entertainment news.

=== Regions and frequencies of broadcast ===
Region	Frequency
Aktau	105
Almaty	101,8
Oskemen	106
Shymkent	86.9

== See also ==
- Toi Duman – another Kazakh music channel for Kazakh folk and traditional songs
