= Balapan, Republic of Bashkortostan =

Balapan Балапан
- Village
- Location within Bashkortostan Location within Russia
- Coordinates: 52°13′N 58°01′E
- Country: Russia
- Region: Bashkortostan
- District: Zilairsky District
- Time zone: UTC+5:00

Balapan (Bashkir and Russian: Балапан) is a rural locality (a village) in Matrayevsky Selsoviet, Zilairsky District, Bashkortostan, Russia. The population was 119 as of 2010. There are 2 streets.

== Geography ==
Balapan is located 58 km east of Zilair (the district's administrative centre) by road. Matrayevo is the nearest rural locality.
