= Urzhar =

Urzhar Ürjar (Kazakh) Урджар (Russian) Ürjar
- Location in Kazakhstan
- Coordinates: 47°5′24″N 81°37′22″E
- Country: Kazakhstan
- Region: Abai Region
- District: Ürjar District

Government
  - Akim: Zhanakov Bauyrzhan Torgaybekovich

Population (2012)
  - Total: 17,320
- Time zone: UTC+6 (Omsk Time)
- Website: http://www.urzhar.vko.gov.kz

Urzhar (also known as Ürjar; Kazakh: Үржар, Ürjar) is a village in the Ürjar river valley and the administrative center of Ürjar District in the Abai Region of eastern Kazakhstan. Population: 17,320 (2009 census results); 16,830 (1999 census results).

== Climate ==
Ürjar has a humid continental climate (Köppen: Dfa), characterized by very cold, snowy winters and very warm summers.

Climate data for Ürjar (1991–2020)
Month	Jan	Feb	Mar	Apr	May	Jun	Jul	Aug	Sep	Oct	Nov	Dec	Year
Mean daily maximum °C (°F)	−7.3 (18.9)	−3.2 (26.2)	3.8 (38.8)	16.7 (62.1)	23.1 (73.6)	28.1 (82.6)	30.3 (86.5)	29.6 (85.3)	23.7 (74.7)	15.4 (59.7)	4.5 (40.1)	−4.4 (24.1)	13.4 (56.1)
Daily mean °C (°F)	−15.0 (5.0)	−11.7 (10.9)	−3.1 (26.4)	9.5 (49.1)	15.6 (60.1)	20.5 (68.9)	22.4 (72.3)	21.0 (69.8)	14.7 (58.5)	6.8 (44.2)	−2.6 (27.3)	−11.5 (11.3)	5.5 (41.9)
Mean daily minimum °C (°F)	−21.6 (−6.9)	−19.0 (−2.2)	−9.5 (14.9)	1.9 (35.4)	7.3 (45.1)	12.1 (53.8)	13.8 (56.8)	11.3 (52.3)	5.2 (41.4)	−0.6 (30.9)	−8.3 (17.1)	−17.8 (0.0)	−2.1 (28.2)
Average precipitation mm (inches)	46.4 (1.83)	36.8 (1.45)	30.4 (1.20)	33.9 (1.33)	36.2 (1.43)	32.1 (1.26)	32.0 (1.26)	22.8 (0.90)	19.8 (0.78)	37.1 (1.46)	65.4 (2.57)	59.7 (2.35)	452.6 (17.82)
Average precipitation days (≥ 1.0 mm)	7.7	6.3	5.9	5.7	5.2	5.3	5.9	3.5	3.4	5.7	8.5	9.1	72.2
Source: NOAA

== Notable residents ==
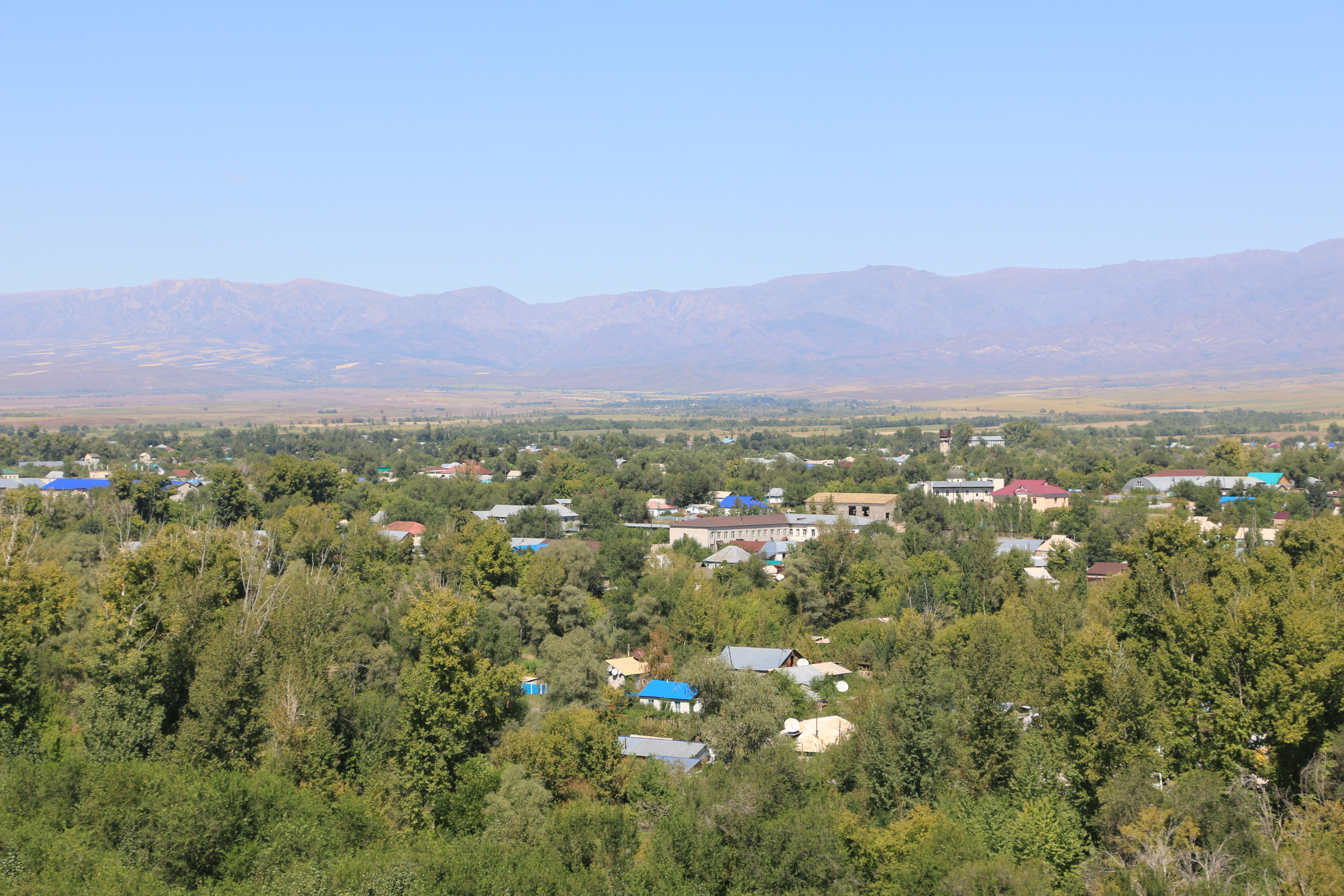
Ürjar

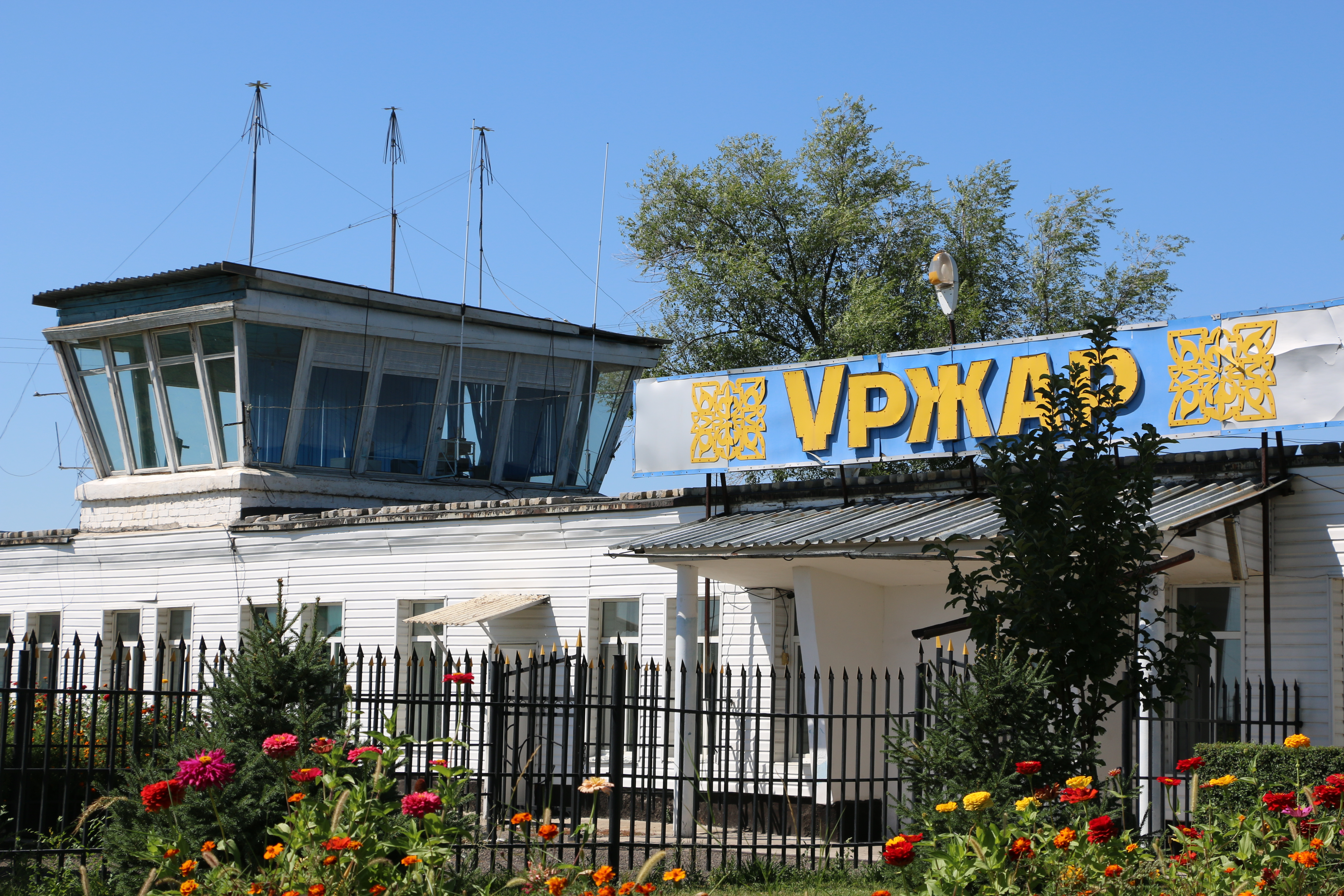
Ürjar Airport

- Almat Kebispayev (born 1987) - Kazakh wrestler, winner of the world championships, champion of Asia.
- Dias Keneshev (born 1981) - Kazakh biathlete, champion of the Asian Games - 2011
- Oxana Yatskaya (born 1988) - Kazakh cross-country skier, competitor at four Olympic Games, kangokle seven times champion of the Asian Games, Universiade medalist.
- Lyazzat Tanysbay (born 1973) - Kazakh journalist, media manager.
