= Radio Classic (Kazakhstan) =

Classic Radio
- Company type: Radio Station
- Industry: Mass media
- Founded: 6 June 2011
- Headquarters: Almaty
- Area served: Kazakhstan; United States
- Products: Radio
- Website: classicfm.kz

Classic Radio is the first classical music radio station in Kazakhstan.

== Mission ==
The main objectives of Radio Classic are:

- Meeting the cultural and aesthetic needs of listeners;
- Providing free around the clock access to the best music created in the last few centuries;
- Promotion of classical music;
- Supporting local artists and composers;
- Creating of original cultural, educational and musical and programs.

== Broadcasts ==
- "Zerkalo" with Natalia Goryacheva (Monday to Friday at 12.00)
- "Kinoblyuz" Oleg Boretskyi (Monday 20.00, repeat - Friday 20.00)
- «Jazz time» Noel Shayakhmetov (Sunday 20.00, repeat - Tuesday 19.00)
- "Culturnaya Mosaica" with Jania Aubakirova (Wednesday 19.00, Saturday 19.00)
