= Channel 7 (Kazakhstan) =

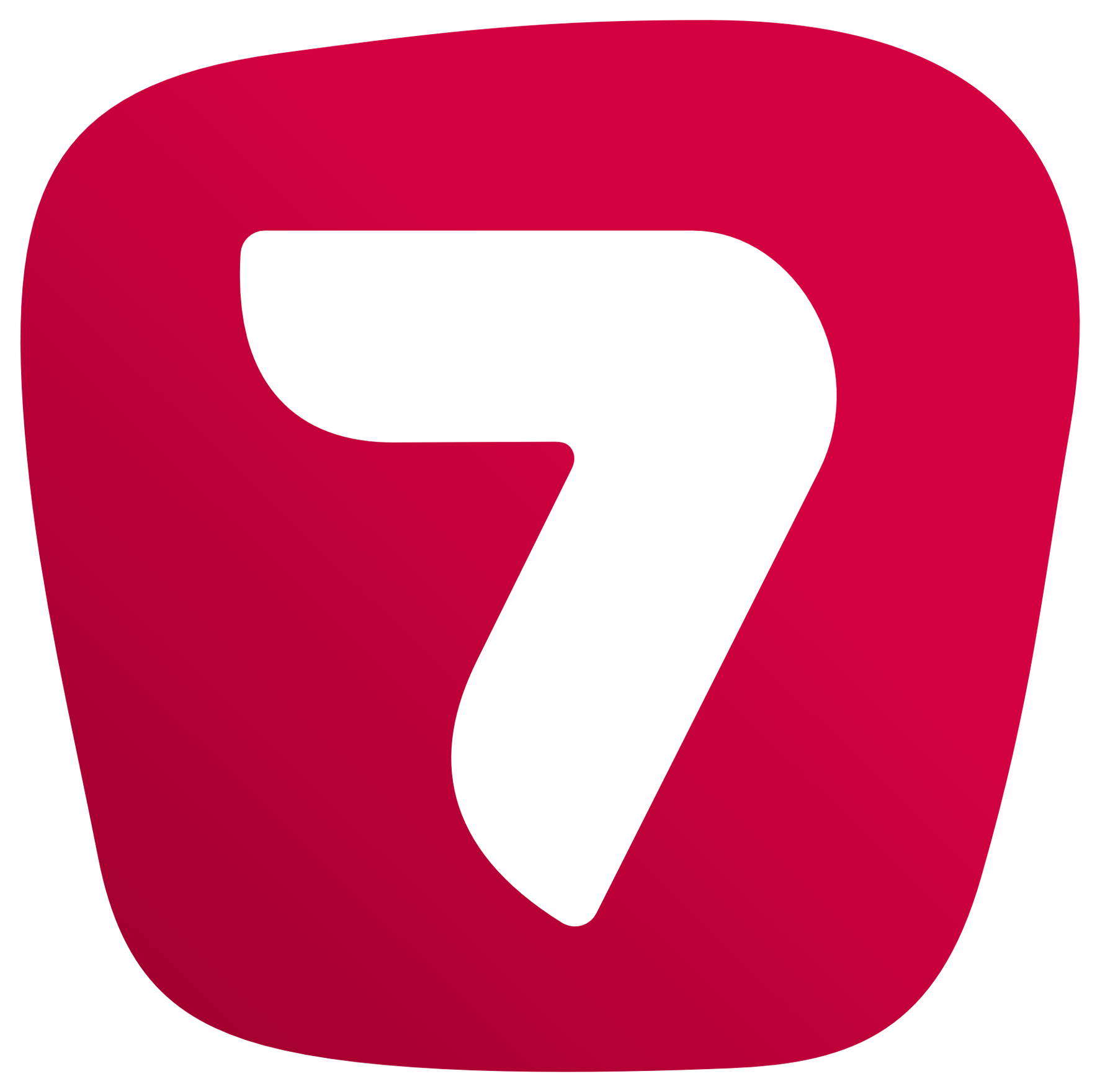
- Country: Kazakhstan
- Broadcast area: Kazakhstan
- Headquarters: Astana, Kazakhstan

Programming
- Languages: Kazakh, Russian

Ownership
- Owner: ERA Television Company

History
- Launched: 9 September 2009; 16 years ago

Links
- Website: tv7.kz

Channel 7 (Kazakh: Жетінші арна; Russian: Седьмой канал), is a Kazakh general entertainment television channel. Headquartered in Astana, it broadcasts daily from 6am to 2am in both Kazakh and Russian languages on cable and satellite in 86 Kazakh cities. According to K Research Central Asia, the channel is constantly one of the three most-watched Kazakh television networks since early 2025.

== History ==
The channel was created on 9 September 2009 on the basis of the former Era TV.

In 2015, it became the first Kazakh channel to employ second screen technology. Its news operation was suspended on 1 June 2015; from February 2016, it became an entertainment channel.

In 2021, the channel started airing the morning show Oyan, Qazaqstan. and Studio-7. News operation restarted in 2022 under the name AIBAT.
