= Qazsport =

- Country: Kazakhstan
- Broadcast area: Kazakhstan
- Network: Qazaqstan Radio and Television Corporation
- Headquarters: QazMedia Ortalgy, Astana

Programming
- Language(s): Kazakh, Russian
- Picture format: 16:9

Ownership
- Owner: Qazaqstan Radio and Television Corporation
- Sister channels: Qazaqstan (TV channel)

History
- Launched: 1 July 2013; 12 years ago
- Former names: KAZsport

Links
- Website: www.qazsporttv.kz

Qazsport is the first Kazakh national sports TV channel. The channel launched on 1 July 2013, as KAZsport and is based in Astana, Kazakhstan.

Qazsport broadcasts the Kazakh championships alongside live broadcasts of major international sporting events, which account for 70% of broadcasting. The commentators are well-known Kazakh sports journalists, who commentate in Kazakh and Russian. The channel also broadcasts news, own productions and sports documentaries in their programme schedule.

== History ==
=== Foundation ===
In 2012, the then President of Kazakhstan, Nursultan Nazarbayev, in his article "Қазақстанның әлеуметтік жаңғыртылуы: Жалпыға ортақ Еңбек қоғамына қарай 20 қадам (Social modernization of Kazakhstan: 20 steps towards a universal labour society)" tasked the Agency for Sports and Physical Education and the Ministry of Culture and information to jointly open a specialized sports channel. In a short period of time, relevant work was done, and on 1 July 2013, the new TV channel "KAZSport" began broadcasting.

70% of the total broadcasts on "QAZSport" are live and original broadcasts, mainly of domestic championships and prestigious international competitions that are popular in Kazakhstan in both the Kazakh and Russian language.

The opening ceremony for the new channel was held at Kazmedia Center in Astana.
