= 24KZ =

24-hour TV news channel in Kazakhstan

Khabar 24 Kazakh: Хабар 24
- Country: Kazakhstan
- Broadcast area: Kazakhstan; Kyrgyzstan; Russia
- Headquarters: Astana, Kazakhstan

Programming
- Language(s): Kazakh, Russian

Ownership
- Owner: Khabar Agency
- Sister channels: El Arna; Khabar Agency; Kazakh TV

History
- Launched: 1 September 2012; 12 years ago
- Former names: 24KZ (2012–2016)

Links
- Website: Official website

24KZ (formerly Khabar 24 and 24KZ, website still named by that) is the first 24-hour news channel in Kazakhstan opened by the initiative of ex-president Nursultan Nazarbayev. The channel mainly focuses on 24 hour news reports, but also has other programmes, such as interviews and much more. There are also sister channels owned by Khabar 24, such as Khabar, a Kazakh movie and culture channel.

== History ==
Khabar 24 was opened at the initiative of Nursultan Nazarbayev in somewhere around late-June 2012. It began broadcast tests on 3 July 2012, as the Kazmedia center; it began fully airing on 1 September 2012. Khabar 24 was initially broadcast through the national network satellite and radio digital broadcasting "Otau TV". In January 2013 the channel began using translation through cable television, and in March 2014, through analog television.

On 11 December 2023, Khabar 24 reverted their name back to 24KZ.

== Programming ==
Khabar 24's main programming is a news program broadcast every half hour, with 48 programs released every day. Between the news, Khabar 24 broadcasts information and thematic programs. It broadcasts 54 information and thematic programs: 44 by outsourcing and 10 produced in house at the Kazmedia Center. An additional source of information is the scrolling chryon. It shows the weather, exchange rates, indicators of stock exchanges, etc.

== Owners ==
- Aksyutits Alexander Vladimirovich (2012—2015)
- Seitmamyt Arman Baltabaevich (2015—2018)
- Gorelik Olga Feliksovna (2018—2019)
- Gorbacheva Alena Valerievna (2019—2022)
- Adilova Aigul Nurkhanovna (2022)
