= Shalkar Radio =

- Kazakhstan

Programming
- Language: Kazakh
- Format: News/talk

Ownership
- Owner: Kazakhstan Radio and Television Corporation

History
- First air date: January 1, 1966

Links
- Website: Shalkar radio

Radio «Shalkar» known locally as "Shalqar Radiosy" is a structural unit of Kazakh Radio, which broadcasts only in the state language. It started broadcasting on January 1, 1966. On October 1, 2012 the station moved into a new broadcasting media centre, «QazMedia Ortalygy», in Astana. The station is included in the RTRC JSC «Kazakhstan».

== History ==
Radio «Shalkar» is a structural unit of Kazakh Radio, which broadcasts only in the state language. It has a history of specialised radio for more than 40 years. To date, the station has been broadcasting 18 hours a day.

The basic concept of radio «Shalkar» is the preservation and development of the spiritual heritage of the Kazakh people.

There is an interesting historical fact about how it got the name "Shalkar". A young specialist who graduated from the Kazakh Pedagogical Institute, Faculty of Journalism, joins the team of "Kazakh Radio", which is just being opened. That young professional was the writer Keneszhan Shalkarov, a member of the Writers' Union of Kazakhstan. When the management of "Kazakh Radio" was preparing to open a new channel, they thought about the name and what to call it. Then, young specialist K. Shalkarov expressed his proposal. He thought about the name "SHALKAR". Thus, the management of "Kazakh Radio" did not object and opened a new channel, which will have a beautiful and very bright name.

Its thematic focus includes informational, analytical, literary, musical, historical and educational programs.

Since April 2009, radio «Shalkar» has been broadcast in a new format. Programs have become more dynamic and focused primarily on the younger generation of listeners.

== Local programming ==
- «Алғыр қазақ»
- «Көзайым»
- «Дәстүр»
- «Елім менің»
- «Қазақтың 1000 күйі»
- «Терме»
- «Төртінші билік»
- «Жақсының жары»
- «Қазақтың қол өнері»
- «Кеш жарық, балақай»
- «Әуелетіп ән салса»
- «Денсаулық»
- «Жұлдызды түн»
- «Тал бесіктен жер бесікке дейін»
- «Аққулы айдын»
- «Жусан исі»
- «Кешеден келдік бүгінге»
- «Тіл-майдан»
- «Заңгер кеңесі»
- «Сазды сәлем»
- «Наркескен»
- «Жайдарман»
- «Әлқисса»
- «Қайырлы таң, қазақ елі!»"Good morning, people of Kazakhstan!"
- «Дидар-ғайып»"A Glimpse Beyond Reach"
- «Қазақ бол!»
- «Біздін елдің жігіттері»
- «Бақ қараған»
- «Ардагерлер»
- «Өнер өлкесі»
- «Ата-жұрт»
- «Атадан калған асыл сөз»
- «Ғасыр ғибраттары»
