= Khabar Agency =

- Formerly: National Television News Agency
- Type: Joint stock company
- Industry: Mass media
- Founded: 1995; 31 years ago
- Headquarters: Almaty
- Area served: Kazakhstan; United States
- Key people: Berik Uali (Chairman of the Board)
- Products: Broadcasting, radio, web portals
- Website: khabar.kz

Khabar TV
- Country: Kazakhstan
- Broadcast area: Kazakhstan
- Headquarters: Almaty, Kazakhstan

Programming
- Languages: Kazakh, Russian

Ownership
- Owner: Khabar Agency
- Sister channels: El Arna; Khabar 24; Jibek Joly TV

History
- Launched: 23 October 1995; 30 years ago

Links
- Website: khabar.kz

Availability

Terrestrial
- Digital terrestrial television: Channel 2

The Khabar Agency (KA) (Kazakh: «Хабар» Агенттігі, romanized: "Habar" Agenttıgı, [χɑbɑr]; Russian: Агентство «Хабар», romanized: Agentstvo "Khabar") is a major media outlet in Kazakhstan. It was established in 1995, known originally as the National Television News Agency (Khabar is News in Kazakh). It is currently one of the largest networks in the country, and broadcasts daily in English and Kazakh and Russian. Additionally, Khabar runs the satellite channel Jibek Joly TV, which is potentially available across Europe and Asia. It features programming in English, Kazakh and Russian.

Khabar's headquarters is located on 4 Kunayev Street in Astana, which is near to Kazakhstan Temir Joly headquarters.

== History ==
Khabar annually hosts the Eurasian Media Forum, which attempts to bring together journalists and political figures to "facilitate the professional development of the Eurasian media and promote international public understanding of Eurasian issues". Since 1 January 2016, Khabar has been an associate member of the European Broadcasting Union (EBU).

=== Ownership ===
The ownership of Khabar has at times not been completely clear. Dariga Nazarbayeva, daughter of Kazakh president Nursultan Nazarbayev, founded and controlled the company. She officially stepped down as company chairwoman during her bid for parliament in 2004. However, she still retained close ties to the agency and continued to organize the Eurasian Media Forum. Her husband, Rakhat Aliyev, confirmed that the couple still held shares in Khabar, along with several other media outlets. He was, however, quick to deny direct ownership, and attacked those who claimed otherwise.

In April 2006, Kazakhstan's Information and Culture Minister Ermukhamet Ertysbayev announced the intention to gain "one hundred-percent state control over the Khabar joint-stock company." This came on the heels of a general government call for greater control of the media, brought about from the turmoil following the murder of political opposition leader Altynbek Sarsenbayev.

Shortly thereafter, Dariga's Asar party was merged into Otan. Some observers see the near-simultaneous loss of both the political party and the Khabar network as efforts by President Nazarbayev to reel in his daughter.

On 5 May 2006, Maulen Ashimbaev, deputy head of the President's administration, was named the new chairman. As of 2006 the state owned 50% plus one share of Khabar.

On March 29, 2022, Berik Uali, the former press secretary of the President of Kazakhstan, was appointed as the new chairman of the Board of "Khabar" News Agency JSC.

=== Political bias ===
As one of the primary media outlets in Kazakhstan, Khabar is often under scrutiny for its role in elections. The agency is often criticized for mostly covering pro-presidential parties, namely Otan (now Amanat) and Asar, Dariga's short-lived party. During the 2004 elections, for example, half of all election coverage on Khabar was devoted to the Asar Party.

== Services ==
- Khabar Radio – broadcasts generalist programming in Kazakh and Russian. It has been broadcast since 1995.
- Khabar TV – started trial broadcasts in 1994, and regular broadcasts from 1995. Nationwide public channel that broadcasts news, entertainment and sports. It replaced Alatau (previously Kazakhstan-2) that was operated by Qazaqstan Radio and Television Corporation.
- Khabar 24 – news channel formerly called 24KZ. Started in 2014 and took over the frequencies of the channel El Arna which shut down at the same time.
- El Arna – originally established in 2000 as Khabar 2. Relaunched several times, and changed its name to El Arna in 2002. Due to weak finances, the channel was closed down in 2014, but re-emerged in March 2017 as a film channel on cable and satellite. The channel broadcasts mainly local films, but also TV series, documentaries and short films. The channel closed on 1 May 2025, and has since merged with Khabar TV.
- Jibek Joly TV – satellite channel started on October 25, 2002. Originally called CaspioNet, but changed to Kazakh TV on September 1, 2012, and then to Qazaq TV in 2020. On September 1, 2022, it was rebranded to Jibek Joly TV.
- Bilim jäne Mädenïet – education and cultural channel which merged with Kazakh TV in October 2016.
