= Balapan (TV channel) =

Children's television channel in Kazakhstan

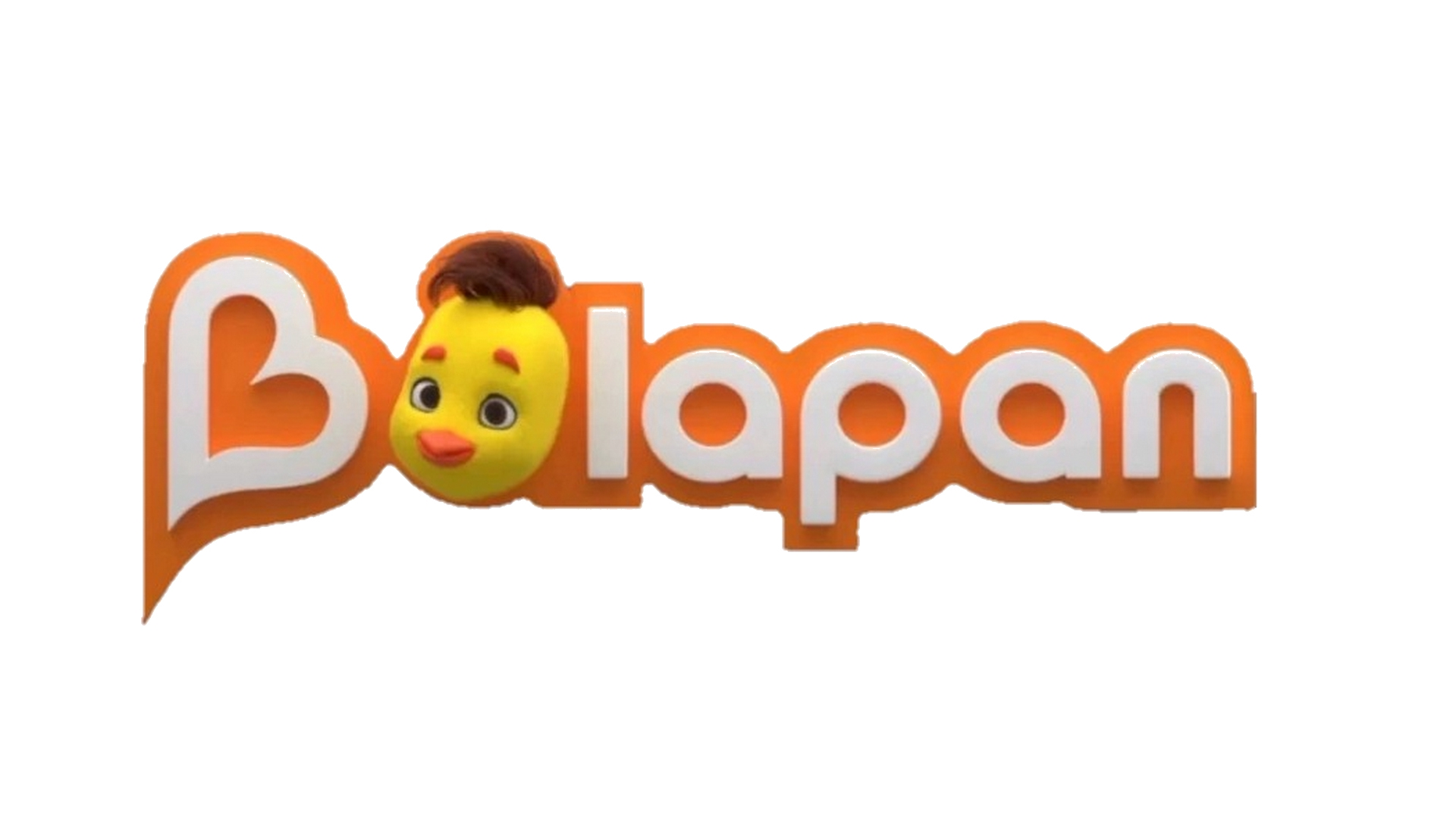
- Country: Kazakhstan
- Broadcast area: Worldwide
- Headquarters: Astana, Kazakhstan

Programming
- Language: Kazakh
- Picture format: 16:9

Ownership
- Owner: Qazaqstan Radio and Television Corporation

History
- Launched: 27 September 2010; 15 years ago

Links
- Website: balapan.tv

Balapan (Kazakh: Balapan - pipsqueak, chick) is a Kazakh children's TV channel.

== History ==
Balapan began streaming on TV on September 27, 2010. It is part of the RTRC JSC "Kazakhstan". On September 3, 2012, broadcasts moved into a new media center "Qazmedia ortalyğy" in Astana. The station broadcasts 17 hours a day in Kazakh in the SD format. Broadcast hours are 07:00 - 00:00 AM. It is the only independent international broadcaster in the world dedicated to children's content.
