= Jibek Joly TV =

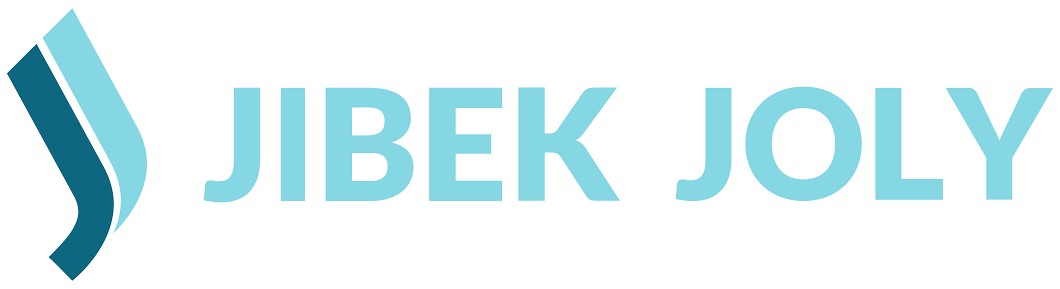
- Country: Kazakhstan
- Broadcast area: Worldwide
- Headquarters: Astana, Kazakhstan

Programming
- Languages: Kazakh, Russian, English, Kyrgyz, Uzbek, Turkish

Ownership
- Owner: Khabar Agency

History
- Launched: 25 October 2002; 23 years ago
- Former names: CaspioNet (2002–2012); Kazakh/Qazaq TV (2012–2022)

Links
- Website: jjtv.kz

Jibek Joly (Kazakh: Жібек Жолы, translated as Silk Way; formerly known as CaspioNet, Kazakh TV, and Qazaq TV) is a family entertainment TV channel that is part of the RSE on the REM "TV and Radio Complex of the President of the Republic of Kazakhstan", broadcasting round-the-clock in two versions: domestic (under the brand "Jibek Joly") - in the Kazakh and Russian languages, and international (under the brand "Silk Way") - in Kazakh, Russian, English, Kyrgyz, Uzbek and Turkish languages. The director of the network is Raushan Zhanabergenovna Kazhibayeva.

== History ==
CaspioNet Logo used until 2012

Logo of Kazakh TV used between 2012 and 2016

25 October 2002 - the channel started broadcasting under the name "CaspioNet".

1 September 2012 - the channel changed its name to "Kazakh TV".

25 October 2012 - from the day of the ten-year anniversary, the channel is formed from the new media center "Kazmedia Ortalygy" in Astana in HDTV standard, 16:9 format.

Since 16 November 2017, Kazakh TV has switched to multilingual broadcasting with soundtracks in Kazakh, Russian and English.

On 1 May 2018, a fourth track in Kyrgyz language was added to the three existing tracks.

On 28 November 2018, the channel started broadcasting in Uzbek.

Since 1 April 2022, the channel is part of the structure of NAO "Teleradiocomplex of the President of the Republic of Kazakhstan".

On 1 September 2022 at 00:00 - TV channel "QazaqTV" rebranded and changed its name to "Jibek Joly" (domestic broadcasting) and "Silk Way" (foreign broadcasting).

== Programming ==
Since September 2022, Daily news and ananalytical programs, such as "Jana Uaqyt", "Novoye Vremya", and political talk shows. Projects, such as "Ana Bolghym Keledi" by Layla Sultanqyzy, music shows by Qaraqat Abildina and Qydyrali Bolmanov, and the late night show "Jana Tungi Studiya" hosted by Nurlan Qoyanbayev. Documentary projects including "Sheteldegi Qazaq Balalary" and "Qandastar", as well as the best documentaries by the TV and Radio Complex of the President of Kazakhstan, featuring unique documentary projects and films. Over 40 informative programs tailored for international audiences, offering insights into Kazakhstan's history, unique nature, culture, traditions, and customs. These include popular projects, such as "Outdoor Central Asia", "Welcome to Kazakhstan", "My Day in Kazakhstan", "Kazakh Brand", "Searching for Mystery", "Ken dala", and various analytical programs.

Since September 2023, analytical programs, such as "Focus Vnimaniya" and "Uade", talk shows "Markhabat" and "JJ Talk", as well as an educational program "Bizdin Dariger". Entertainment projects, such as "Tungi Studiya with Nurlan Qoyanbayev", "Torletiniz!", "Zhuldyzbysyn?", and Aigul Mukey's project "Ozger". Additionally, viewers can enjoy domestic films, best international films, popular TV series, and animated films dubbed in Kazakh, as well as the Silk Way's best archival projects. Silk Way Cinema is a channel that broadcasts in Kazakh and Russian languages. The channel offers a diverse lineup including educational programs, documentaries, music projects, comedy shows, and content by the republican TV channels and "Kazakhfilm" studio. Accessible via the Yamal 401 90° (FSU) satellite, Silk Way Cinema reaches viewers in over 10 countries.

More than half of Jibek Joly's content consists of domestically produced programs. In addition, Jibek Joly airs best international films, popular TV series, and animated films dubbed in Kazakh, as well as the Silk Way TV channel's best archival projects. Silk Way is the international branch of the Jibek Joly TV channel. Silk Way is the first national satellite television channel of the Republic of Kazakhstan, broadcasting to 118 countries on four continents via the HotbIRD 13B, Galaxy 19, and Measat 3A satellites. The channel's content is 100% domestically produced.

The channel's programs are divided into several themes covering areas, such as culture, traditions, history, tourism, and Kazakhstan's investment capacity. Additionally, the channel broadcasts the latest and up-to-date news on a daily basis with an emphasis on Kazakhstan and Central Asia. Kazakhstan's international satellite channel began broadcasting on 25 October 2002, in Kazakh, Russian, and English languages. In 2018, broadcasting was additionally launched in Kyrgyz and Uzbek languages. The channel's multi-language channel format allows each digital television viewer to choose their preferred audio track in any of the 5 languages available.

In September 2023, "New Time", an English-language news and analytical program, was launched. The program covers the latest significant political, economic, cultural, and sports news from Kazakhstan and Central Asia. In January 2024, the Silk Way channel launched an English-language special report, titled "Reporter with President" which covers the Kazakh president's overseas visits, as well as the visits by world leaders to Kazakhstan.
