= Astana TV =

Kazakh television channel

- Country: Kazakhstan
- Broadcast area: Kazakhstan
- Headquarters: Astana, Kazakhstan

Programming
- Language(s): Kazakh, Russian

Ownership
- Owner: Nur Media

History
- Launched: 1 March 1993
- Former names: Tsesna (1993–2000); AsTV (2000–2004); Astana (2004–2012)

Links
- Website: www.astanatv.kz

Astana TV logo used from 2012 until 2019.

Astana TV logo used until 2009.

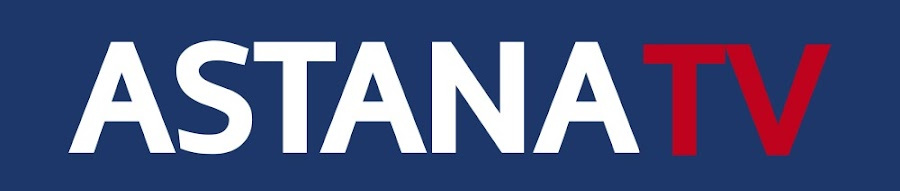
Astana TV logo used in 2019-present

Astana TV is a Kazakh television channel based in Astana, Kazakhstan, and it is owned and operated by the Nur Media. It were originally launched in March 1993 as Tsesna.

== Programs ==
- "Status QUO" (Dialogue)
- "Olzha"
- "Kinostan"
- "Kaznet"
- "Main News" (News)
- "Keneskhana"
- "KVN Kazakh League"
- "KHL matches of Barys Astana"
