= T.A.T.u. discography =

t.A.T.u. discography
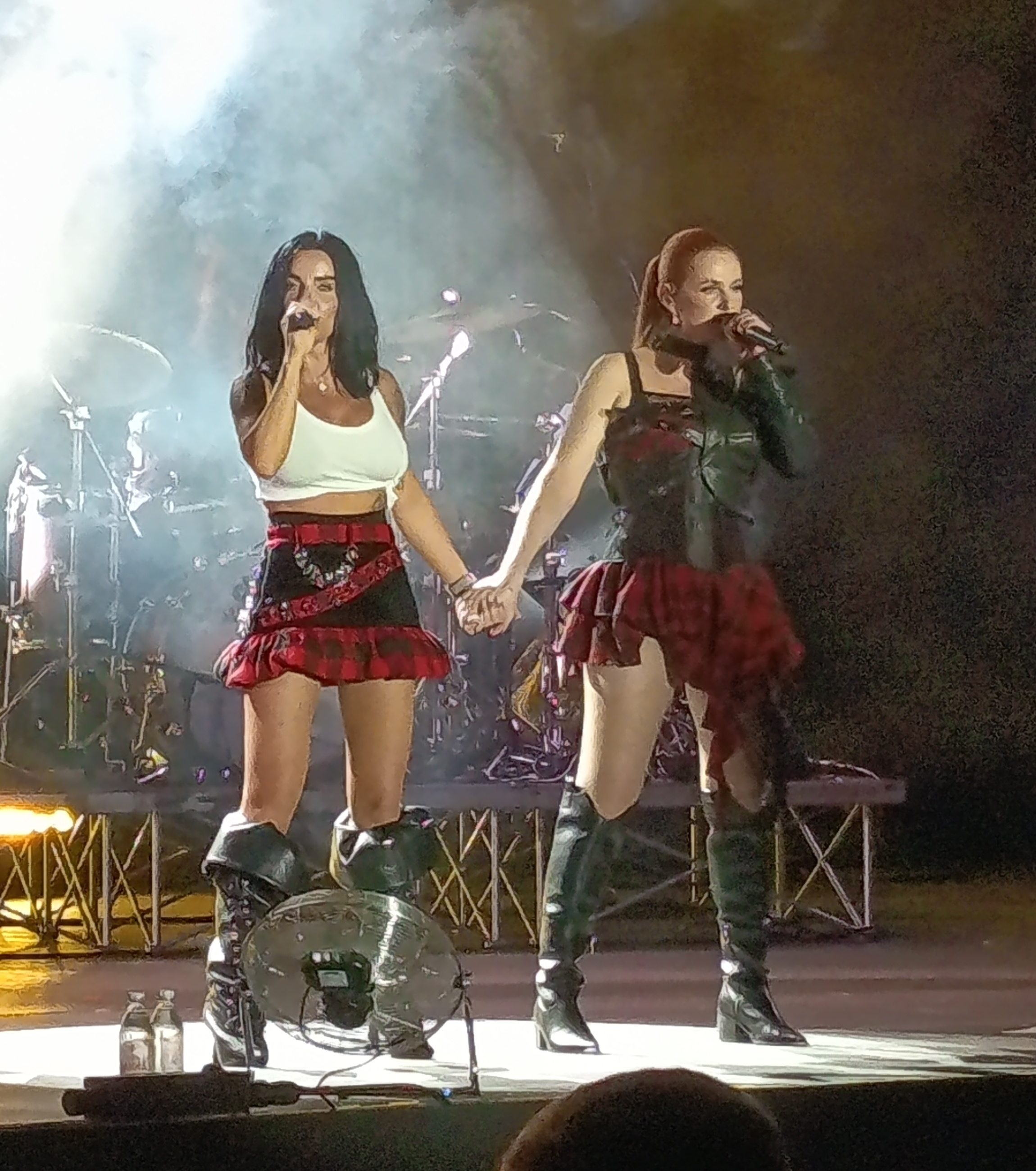
- t.A.T.u. performing in Italy in 2026
- Studio albums: 6
- Compilation albums: 2
- Singles: 19
- Video albums: 3
- Remix albums: 2
- Promotional singles: 3

Russian duo t.A.T.u. has released six studio albums, two compilation albums, two remix albums, nineteen singles, and three promotional singles. They debuted in 2000 with the single "Ya Soshla S Uma", from their debut album 200 Po Vstrechnoy, released in 2001 by Universal Music Russia. The album reached number one in the Czech Republic, Poland, Russia, and Slovakia. After selling 850,000 copies in Russia, it was certified platinum by the IFPI for over one million copies in Europe, making it the first time for an Eastern European act. The album's English-language counterpart, 200 km/h in the Wrong Lane, was released worldwide by Interscope Records in 2002. It reached number thirteen on the US Billboard 200 and was certified gold by the RIAA. In Japan, the album reached number one, a first for a foreign group, (Note: Although Billboard claimed t.A.T.u. as the first non-Japanese act to debut at number one in Japan, South Korean singer BoA was the first artist overall to achieve such feat in 2002 with her debut Japanese album Listen to my Heart—the singer's second Japanese album Valenti also reached number one on its first week in 2003, one month before t.A.T.u.'s Japanese debut. According to Oricon, t.A.T.u. became the first foreign group to reach number one with their self-titled Japanese debut album. The album had peaked at number three in its first week on the Oricon Albums Chart.) and sold 1.8 million copies. It was also certified platinum by the IFPI for over one million copies sold in Europe. 200 km/h in the Wrong Lane was promoted with the duo's first international single, "All the Things She Said", which topped the charts in Australia, Ireland, New Zealand, and the United Kingdom while peaking at number twenty on the Billboard Hot 100. The album also produced three more singles—"Not Gonna Get Us", "30 Minutes", and "How Soon Is Now?"— with the former becoming t.A.T.u.'s second top-10 single in Ireland and the United Kingdom. Ultimately, 200 km/h in the Wrong Lane became the twelfth best-selling album of 2003, selling over 5 million copies worldwide. A remix album titled Remixes was released in 2003 and certified gold in Russia.

t.A.T.u.'s third and fourth studio albums, Dangerous and Moving and Lyudi Invalidy, respectively, were released in 2005. Dangerous and Moving achieved its best placing in Taiwan, where it peaked at number four. It reached the top 10 in Mexico, where it was certified gold, and Japan, as well as the top 20 in Germany and Italy. Its first single, "All About Us", reached number five on Russia's TopHit chart and the top 10 in several European countries, including the United Kingdom. "All About Us" also reached the top 40 in Australia, Ireland, and Japan. Two more singles from Dangerous and Moving, "Friend or Foe" and "Gomenasai", achieved popularity in Europe. Lyudi Invalidy was certified platinum in Russia. The duo released their greatest hits album, The Best in 2006 after parting ways with Universal Music. The single "Loves Me Not" was selected to promote the album and reached the top 40 in Russia and Slovakia.

t.A.T.u.'s fifth studio album Vesyolye Ulybki was released in 2008. It spawned four singles—"Beliy Plaschik", "220", "You and I" and "Snegopady", all of which charted in the Russian top 100. The album's English-language counterpart Waste Management followed in 2009. The duo released the remix album Waste Management Remixes before splitting in 2011. With 10 million records sold worldwide, t.A.T.u. rank among the best-selling girl groups.

== Albums ==
=== Studio albums ===
List of studio albums, with selected chart positions, sales figures and certifications
Title	Details	Peak chart positions										Sales	Certifications
Title	Details	AUS	CAN	FRA	GER	ITA	JPN	NZ	SWI	UK	US	Sales	Certifications
200 Po Vstrechnoy (200 по встречной)	Released: 21 May 2001; Label: Neformat, Universal Music Russia; Formats: CD, cassette	—	—	—	—	—	123	—	—	—	—		
200 km/h in the Wrong Lane	Released: 7 October 2002; Label: Interscope; Formats: CD, cassette	19	19	8	3	5	1	9	5	12	13	World: 5,000,000 (Note: Worldwide sales figures for 200 km/h in the Wrong Lane, including cumulative sales from 200 Po Vstrechnoy, as of November 2005.); JPN: 1,800,000; US: 831,000 (Note: United States sales figures for 200 km/h in the Wrong Lane as of April 2011.)	BPI: Gold; BVMI: Gold; IFPI SWI: Platinum; MC: 2× Platinum; RIAA: Gold; RIAJ: Million; SNEP: Gold
Dangerous and Moving	Released: 10 October 2005; Label: Interscope; Formats: CD, digital download	—	91	23	12	15	10	—	26	78	131	FRA: 69,100 (Note: France sales figures for Dangerous and Moving as of December 2005.); JPN: 38,057 (Note: Japan sales figures for Dangerous and Moving as of October 2005.); US: 93,000 (Note: United States sales figures for Dangerous and Moving as of January 2010.)	
Lyudi Invalidy (Люди инвалиды)	Released: 21 October 2005; Label: Interscope, Universal Music Russia; Formats: CD, digital download	—	—	—	—	—	—	—	—	—	—		
Vesyolye Ulybki (Весёлые улыбки)	Released: 21 October 2008; Label: Soyuz; Formats: CD, digital download	—	—	—	—	—	—	—	—	—	—		
Waste Management	Released: 15 December 2009; Label: Misterya Zvuka; Formats: CD, digital download	—	—	—	—	—	—	—	—	—	—	US: 1,000 (Note: United States sales figures for Waste Management as of January 2010.)	
"—" denotes a recording that did not chart or was not released in that territory.

=== Compilation albums ===
List of compilation albums, with selected chart positions and certifications
Title	Details	Peak chart positions				Certifications
Title	Details	RUS	ITA	JPN	TWN	Certifications
Remixes	Released: 26 September 2003; Label: Universal Music Russia, Interscope; Formats: CD, CD+DVD, cassette	— (Note: The National Federation of Phonogram Producers (NFPF) was established in 2001 and compiled sales figures for music releases in Russia until 2004. The album Remixes, which was released in 2003, peaked at number three on the monthly NFPF chart for February 2004.)	—	105	—	NTPP: Gold
The Best	Released: 7 September 2006; Label: Interscope; Formats: CD, CD+DVD, digital download, cassette	—	88	204	11	
Waste Management Remixes (parts 1 and 2)	Released: 29 March 2011; Label: T.A. Music; Format: digital download	—	—	—	—	
V Podnebesnoy	Released: 24 October 2025; Label: Fenix, Neformat; Format: digital download	—	—	—	—	
"—" denotes a recording that did not chart or was not released in that territory.

== Singles ==
List of singles, with selected chart positions and certifications, showing year released and album name
Title	Year	Peak chart positions										Certifications	Album
Title	Year	RUS (Note: TopHit first published its Russian Airplay Chart for the week of 24–30 November 2003; before that, only Music & Media published its radio chart for Russia.)	AUS	FRA	GER	ITA	JPN	NZ	SWI	UK	US	Certifications	Album
"Ya Soshla S Uma" ("Я сошла с ума")	2000	—	—	—	—	—	—	—	—	—	—		200 Po Vstrechnoy
"Nas Ne Dogonyat" ("Нас не догонят")	2001	—	—	—	—	—	—	—	—	—	—		200 Po Vstrechnoy
"30 Minut" ("30 минут")	2001	10	—	—	—	—	—	—	—	—	—		200 Po Vstrechnoy
"Prostye Dvizheniya" ("Простые движения")	2002	—	—	—	—	—	—	—	—	—	—		Remixes
"All the Things She Said"	2002	—	1	2	1	1	38	1	1	1	20	ARIA: Platinum; BPI: 2× Platinum; BVMI: 2× Platinum; FIMI: Gold; IFPI SWI: Platinum; RMNZ: 2× Platinum; SNEP: Gold	200 km/h in the Wrong Lane
"Not Gonna Get Us"	2003	—	11	18	15	4	86	25	18	7	— (Note: "Not Gonna Get Us" did not enter the Billboard Hot 100, but peaked at number 35 on the Mainstream Top 40 chart, and number 1 on the Dance Club Songs chart.)	ARIA: Gold	200 km/h in the Wrong Lane
"Ne Ver', Ne Boysia" ("Не верь, не бойся")	2003	—	—	—	—	—	—	—	—	—	—		Remixes
"30 Minutes"	2003	—	—	—	—	—	—	—	—	—	—		200 km/h in the Wrong Lane
"How Soon Is Now?"	2003	—	37	—	33	—	—	—	21	—	—		200 km/h in the Wrong Lane
"All About Us"	2005	5	39	7	7	4	27	—	9	8	— (Note: "All About Us" did not enter the Billboard Hot 100, but peaked at number 13 on the Dance Club Songs chart.)		Dangerous and Moving
"Lyudi Invalidy" ("Люди инвалиды")	2005	63	—	—	—	—	—	—	—	—	—		Lyudi Invalidy
"Friend or Foe" (Note: The version of "Friend or Foe" that charted on the Russian Airplay Chart was the Morels Pink Noise Radio Edit.)	2005	13	—	—	—	16	—	—	75	48	—		Dangerous and Moving
"Gomenasai"	2006	75	—	—	30	—	—	—	—	—	—		Dangerous and Moving
"Loves Me Not"	2006	28	—	—	—	—	—	—	—	—	—		The Best
"Beliy Plaschik" ("Белый плащик")	2007	97	—	—	—	—	—	—	—	—	—		Vesyolye Ulybki
"220"	2008	55	—	—	—	—	—	—	—	—	—		Vesyolye Ulybki
"You and I"	2008	91	—	—	—	—	—	—	—	—	—		Vesyolye Ulybki
"Snegopady" ("Снегопады")	2009	—	—	—	—	—	—	—	—	—	—		Vesyolye Ulybki
"Snowfalls"	2009	—	—	—	—	—	—	—	—	—	—		Waste Management

=== Promotional singles ===
List of promotional singles, showing year released and album name
Title	Year	Album
"Show Me Love" (Note: Only released in Poland.)	2002	200 km/h in the Wrong Lane
"White Robe" (Note: Only released in Brazil.)	2009	Waste Management
"Sparks"	2009	Waste Management

== Videography ==
=== Music videos ===
List of music videos, showing year released and directors
Title	Year	Director(s)	Ref.
"Ya Soshla S Uma"	2000	Ivan Shapovalov	
"Nas Ne Dogonyat"	2001	Ivan Shapovalov	
"30 Minut"	2001	Ivan Shapovalov	
"Prostye Dvizheniya"	2002	Ivan Shapovalov	
"All the Things She Said"	2002	Ivan Shapovalov	
"Not Gonna Get Us"	2003	Ivan Shapovalov	
"30 Minutes"	2003	Ivan Shapovalov	
"Ne Ver', Ne Boysia"	2003	Alexei Akellov	
"How Soon Is Now?"	2003	Lena Katina; Julia Volkova	
"All About Us"	2005	James Cox	
"Lyudi Invalidy"	2005	James Cox	
"Friend or Foe"	2005	James Cox	
"Gomenasai" (anime video)	2006	Hype Williams	
"Gomenasai"	2006	Randy Sosin	
"Beliy Plaschik"	2007	James Cox	
"220"	2008	James Cox	
"Snegopady"	2009	Boris Renski	
"Snowfalls"	2009	Boris Renski	
"White Robe"	2009	James Cox	
"Sparks"	2010	James Cox	

=== Video albums ===
Year	Title
2003	Screaming for More: Released: 24 November 2003; Compilation DVD
2004	Anatomy of t.A.T.u.: Released: 2004 (limited); Documentary
2007	Truth: Live in St. Petersburg: Released: 12 September 2007; Live DVD
