= Friend or Foe (t.A.T.u. song) =

2005 single by t.A.T.u.

- US and UK Cover

Single by t.A.T.u.

from the album Dangerous and Moving
- A-side: "Not Gonna Get Us" (European CD)
- Released: December 2005
- Recorded: March 2005
- Genre: Pop rock; alternative rock; dance-pop
- Length: 3:08
- Label: Interscope
- Songwriters: Dave Stewart; Martin Kierszenbaum
- Producers: Martin Kierszenbaum; Robert Orton

t.A.T.u. singles chronology
"Lyudi Invalidy" (2005)	"Friend or Foe" (2005)	"Gomenasai" (2006)

Music video
- "Friend or Foe" on YouTube

Alternative cover
- European cover

"Friend or Foe" is a song by Russian recording duo t.A.T.u., taken from the group's second English language studio album Dangerous and Moving (2005). The song was written by Dave Stewart and Martin Kierszenbaum, while production was handled by Kierszenbaum and Robert Orton. It was released by Interscope in December 2005 as the album's second single. Musically, "Friend or Foe" is a pop rock and electropop inspired song, with dance music influences. Its lyrics are intentionally ambiguous, making it unclear who the song is addressed to.

The song received generally positive reviews from critics, with many identifying it as the album's best track, along with praise for its dance nature and lyrical content. It did not perform as successfully as the group's previous single "All About Us", charting just under the top forty in most countries it charted in. An accompanying music video was issued, featuring the group singing to fans in a cave.

== Background and release ==
The song was written by Dave Stewart and Martin Kierszenbaum, while production was handled by Kierszenbaum and Robert Orton. The song was released by Interscope in 2005 as the album's second single. For the production and promotion of the single, it was handled by some big names from the rock music industry. These included Sting, who played bass on the track, and Bryan Adams, who shot the cover sleeve. The song was the group's last single to be released in the United Kingdom and United States, due to the lack of success.

The song was released in multiple formats. The CD single was released in 2005 featuring the song with remixes, a music video and an "All About Us" remix. In December 2005, Interscope issued a remix EP featuring remixes that were released in Europe and the United Kingdom. A Part 2 CD single was issued in France as a maxi-single. The same month, Interscope Records announced that they would issue a 12-inch vinyl CD in the United States, only containing remixes of the single. The song was issued physically in the UK on 6 February 2006.

== Critical reception ==
"Friend or Foe" received positive remarks from most music critics. Michael Boyles from The Pitt News gave it a positive review, saying that alone with "Loves Me Not"; " stand out as the most sexually ambiguous of this type and are two of the best tracks on the album [...]" Michael Freedburg from The Boston Phoenix said along with "Perfect Enemy", "Dangerous and Moving" and "All About Us"; "shoot straight to the gut – and to the heart." Betty Clarke from The Guardian described the song as "vapid" and "epic synth-rock". Dom Passantino from Stylus Magazine compared the lyrical content to the group's previous record "Not Gonna Get Us" by explaining "which is effectively a straight-up rewrite of previous album single 'Not Gonna Get Us.'"

== Chart performance ==
"Friend or Foe" generally received mixed reception surrounding chart positions. The song managed to make the top three in Hungary, peaking at number three. The song then managed to peak inside the top forty in countries including the Czech Republic, Italy and the Wallonia region of Belgium. In the United Kingdom, the song spent a sole week on the UK singles chart at forty-eight. It was the group's last single to chart in the United Kingdom.

The song did not offer better success in various European countries, peaking at number three on the Flanders Ultratip extension chart in Belgium, seventy-five on the Swiss Singles Chart and eighty-nine on the Mega Single Top 100 in the Netherlands.

== Music video ==
From 16 October 2005 to 17 October 2005, t.A.T.u. shot their video in the Los Angeles suburbs, directed by James Cox and produced by Billy Parks. The video was released on 8 November 2005.

The video was shot at Bronson Caves (where the original Batman TV series was filmed) in Hollywood by 1171 Production Group. The group previously worked on such t.A.T.u videos as "All About Us" and "Lyudi Invalidy" and has experience in making videos for Eminem and Celine Dion. Bronson Caves are famous for being the set location of Western movies and Batman series. The video was retired on Poland's TRL after spending 50 days on the countdown. The video did have more airplay in the U.S. than "All About Us" but it was still not played much.

In the video, Lena and Yulia both immaculately dressed in black, drive to the caves in a Chevrolet Chevelle. Yulia snaps her fingers and music begins to play as the girls perform in front of a mosh pit for a crowd of fans, who all dance and move to the song. Toward the middle, Yulia heads off stage, by the crowd and to a piano, where she begins to play. When she is done, she and Lena return to singing the rest of song.

A "Making Of" video for this music video was released on the DVD of The Best.

== Track listings ==
UK Maxi-CD single
Released 6 February 2006

1. "Friend or Foe" (Single Version)
2. "All About Us" (Sunset in Ibiza Radio Mix By Guéna LG)
3. "Friend or Foe" (Morel's Pink Noise Mix)
- "Friend or Foe" (Music Video)

France Maxi-CD single
Released 6 February 2006

1. "Friend or Foe" (Glam As You Mix By Guéna LG)
2. "Friend or Foe" (Lenny Bertoldo Club Mix)
3. "Friend or Foe" (L.E.X. Massive Dub)
4. "Friend or Foe" (Morel'S Pink Noise Dub)
5. "Friend or Foe" (Lenny Bertoldo Dub)

Europe Maxi-CD single
Released 10 March 2006

1. "Friend or Foe" (Single Version)
2. "Friend or Foe" (L.E.X. Global Oxygen Edit)
3. "Friend or Foe" (Morel's Pink Noise Mix)
- "Friend or Foe" (Music Video)

The Remixes

1. "Friend or Foe" (L.E.X. Club Mix)
2. "Friend or Foe" (L.E.X. Global Oxygen Mix)
3. "Friend or Foe" (Morel's Pink Noise Mix)
4. "Friend or Foe" (Lenny B Club Mix)
5. "Friend or Foe" (L.E.X. Massive Club Edit)
6. "Friend or Foe" (L.E.X. Global Oxygen Edit)
7. "Friend or Foe" (Morel's Pink Noise Radio Edit)
8. "Friend or Foe" (Lenny B Club Radio Edit)
9. "Friend or Foe" (L.E.X. Massive Dub)
10. "Friend or Foe" (Morel's Pink Noise Dub)
11. "Friend or Foe" (Lenny B Dub)
12. "Friend or Foe" (Glam As You Mix)
13. "Friend or Foe" (Glam As You Radio Mix)

== Charts ==
=== Weekly charts ===
Weekly chart performance for "Friend or Foe"
Chart (2006)	Peak position
Belgium (Ultratip Bubbling Under Flanders)	3
Belgium (Ultratop 50 Wallonia)	27
CIS Airplay (TopHit)	16
Czech Republic Airplay (ČNS IFPI)	12
Hungary (Rádiós Top 40)	3
Hungary (Dance Top 40)	25
Ireland (IRMA)	34
Italy (FIMI)	16
Netherlands (Single Top 100)	89
Russia Airplay (TopHit)	13
Scotland Singles (Official Charts)	33
Switzerland (Schweizer Hitparade)	75
Ukraine Airplay (TopHit)	95
UK Singles (Official Charts)	48

=== Year-end charts ===
2006 year-end chart performance for "Friend or Foe"
Chart (2006)	Position
CIS (TopHit)	50
Hungary (Rádiós Top 40)	70
Russia Airplay (TopHit)	48

== Release history ==
Release dates and formats for "Friend or Foe"
Region	Date	Format(s)	Label(s)	Ref.
Italy	6 February 2006	Digital download	Interscope	
United Kingdom	6 February 2006	CD	Interscope	
Europe	10 March 2006	CD	Interscope	

== Other uses in media ==
The song "Friend or Foe" was also featured on MTV's 3rd season of Laguna Beach.
