= The Best (t.A.T.u. album) =

Greatest hits album by t.A.T.u.
- Released: 11 September 2006
- Recorded: 1999–2005
- Length: 75:12
- Languages: English; Russian
- Labels: Universal; Interscope
- Producers: Boris Rensky; Trevor Horn; Martin Kierszenbaum; Robert Orton; Sergio Galoyan; Denis Ingoldsby; Ryan Tedder

t.A.T.u. chronology
Lyudi Invalidy (2005)	The Best (2006)	Vesyolye Ulybki (2008)

Singles from The Best
- 1. "Loves Me Not" Released: September 22, 2006

The Best (aka t.A.T.u. The Best) is the first greatest hits album by the Russian group t.A.T.u. It was released in September 2006, featuring hit singles, rare mixes, three previously unreleased tracks, a live concert, music videos, and more. There are two versions of the set, one with only a CD, and another with a CD and a DVD (also referred to as the "Deluxe Edition").

The Best was t.A.T.u.'s final release with the Universal Music Group label. Previously they went through Universal International.

== Release ==
The set was released on 4 September 2006, in Korea and Brazil, 11 September in Europe, 27 September in Japan, 29 September in Germany and 10 October in the United States. It was later releases on the iTunes Store on 7 November. There were different releases of the album, including a cassette, compact disc, DVD and vinyl. In Korea, the "Deluxe Edition" came with a poster. In the U.S., only the CD version was sold, and only in Best Buy stores. However, for U.S. online retailers, it was available, and for some by import from Korea.

== Facts and missing songs ==
There were numerous inaccuracies, misspelled words and other associated issues with the album. On the sides there is missing a dot in the t.A.T.u. logo. Additionally, the song "Ya Soshla S Uma" was misspelled as "Ya Soshia S Uma" on the back cover. Similarly, "Nas Ne Dogonyat" was written as "Nas Ne Dagoniat" (although it is a valid transliteration). Both those versions are not the Russian edits.

The album is marketed as featuring three previously unreleased tracks; however, in reality, only "Null and Void" had not been released prior. The other two tracks consist of a remix and the song "Divine", the latter of which had already appeared as a b-side on the "All About Us" single. Although the album describes "Divine" as an extended edit, it is identical to the previously released version.

Originally, the track "Prostye Dvizheniya" was intended to be included in the album. Nevertheless, for reasons that remain unclear, it was ultimately omitted from the final release.

When played via iTunes, the GraceNote database incorrectly identifies the first track as "Radio" instead of the correct title, "All About Us".

Additionally, while the album cover does not list the music videos for "Friend or Foe" or the edited version of "All About Us", both are included on the accompanying DVD.

== Critical reception ==
Professional ratings
Review scores
Source	Rating
AllMusic	3.5/5 stars

The Best received generally positive reviews from music critics. Stephen Thomas Erlewine from AllMusic gave it four out of five stars. He concluding saying "since a little t.A.T.u. can go a long way, it's best to get all the big hits in one place; the rest of the record might still be filler even on a hits disc, but at least it has all the big songs, which The Best certainly does, and that should satisfy any listener who considers the Russian duo a guilty pleasure." However, he did say that the album was too early for a release.

== Singles ==
"Loves Me Not" is the only single released from The Best, issued in September 2006. Although the track originally appeared on the album Dangerous and Moving, it is considered the first and only official single from the compilation The Best. A limited number of copies were printed and distributed in Europe. An alternate version of the song is featured on the Russian album Lyudi Invalidy.

== Track listing ==
#	Track title	
1.	All About Us	3:01
2.	All The Things She Said	3:32
3.	Not Gonna Get Us	4:20
4.	How Soon Is Now?	3:14
5.	Loves Me Not	2:54
6.	Friend or Foe (Radio Edit)	3:06
7.	Gomenasai	3:42
8.	Null & Void (Previously unreleased, English version of "Obez'yanka Nol")	4:25
9.	Cosmos (Outer Space) (She Wants Revenge Remix)	5:36
10.	Show Me Love (Radio Edit)	3:49
11.	Craving (I Only Want What I Can't Have) (Bollywood Mix)	4:08
12.	Ne Ver', Ne Boysia, Ne Prosi (Не Верь, Не Бойся, Не Проси) (Eurovision 2003)	3:02
13.	30 Minutes	3:16
14.	Divine (Extended Version)	3:17
15.	Perfect Enemy	4:09
16.	All The Things She Said (Dave Audé Remix Edit)	5:15
17.	Lyudi Invalidy (Люди Инвалиды) (Russian Radio Remix)	3:22
18.	Loves Me Not (Glam As You Mix Radio Edit)	3:11
19.	Nas Ne Dogonyat (Нас Не Догонят) (Not Gonna Get Us (Russian Version))	4:21
20.	Ya Soshla S Uma (Я Сошла С Ума) (All The Things She Said (Russian Version))	3:34

•: 2002 version, the edit used on the English counterpart of 200 Po Vstrechnoy, 200 km/h in the Wrong Lane

=== Disc 2 (DVD) ===
Live Performance at Glam As You in Paris, France
"Dangerous And Moving (Intro)"
"All About Us"
"Not Gonna Get Us"
"Obezyanka Nol (Обезьянка Ноль)"
"Loves Me Not"
"All The Things She Said"
Music Videos
"Gomenasai"
"Gomenasai" (Animated Version)
"How Soon Is Now?"
"Lyudi Invalidy (Люди Инвалиды)"
"All About Us" (Explicit Version)
"All About Us" (Edited Version) (Not listed on back part track listing)
"Friend or Foe" (Not listed on back part track listing)
Remix Videos
"All The Things She Said" (Hardrum Remix)
"Not Gonna Get Us" (Dave Audés Velvet Dub)
"All About Us" (Dave Audé's Big Mixshow)
"Friend or Foe" (L.E.X. Massive Club Remix)
Making Of
"All About Us" Video
"Friend or Foe" Video ft. Sting
Making of the song, "Gomenasai" featuring Richard Carpenter
International TV spots
* Japan, Germany, France, Taiwan, United Kingdom, Russia

== Charts ==
=== Weekly charts ===
Weekly chart performance for The Best
Chart (2006)	Peak position
Italian Albums (FIMI)	88
Japanese Albums (Oricon)	204
Taiwan Albums (G-Music)	11
Taiwan International Albums (G-Music)	1

=== Monthly charts ===
Monthly charts for The Best
Chart (2006)	Peak position
Polish Albums (ZPAV)	65
