= Waste management (disambiguation) =

Waste management encompasses all of the activities and actions required to manage waste from its inception to its final disposal.

Waste management may also refer to:

- Waste Management (corporation)
- Waste Management (album)
