= Screaming for More =

Video by t.A.T.u.
- Released: November 24, 2003
- Recorded: 2000–2003
- Genre: Pop rock
- Length: 60:30
- Label: Interscope
- Director: Ivan Shapovalov

t.A.T.u. chronology
Screaming for More (2003)	Truth: Live in St. Petersburg (2007)

Screaming for More is a DVD release of the Russian music duo t.A.T.u. It was released on 24 November 2003 in Europe and Russia, then on 23 March 2004 in the United States and Canada, by Interscope Records. This release was also available in VCD format.

The DVD has subtitles in English, French, German, Spanish, and Portuguese.

== DVD Content ==
Originally scheduled to be released in May 2003, the DVD contains ten music videos, three behind the scenes videos, a photo gallery, performances and a questions and answers feature from Julia and Lena. However, the photo gallery is not a slideshow and must be pushed by the next or back buttons to see the pictures.

- All the Things She Said & Ya Soshla S Uma
1. "All the Things She Said" Video
2. "Ya Soshla S Uma" Video
3. "All the Things She Said" Remix Video
- Not Gonna Get Us & Nas Ne Dogonyat
1. "Not Gonna Get Us" Video
2. "Nas Ne Dogonyat" Video
3. "Not Gonna Get Us" Remix Video
- "30 Minutes" Video
- "How Soon Is Now?" Video
- Behind the Scenes with Julia and Lena
1. Part 1 (in the studios)
2. Part 2 (interview and travelling)
3. Part 3 (question and answers)
- Performance/Rehearsal Footage
1. MTV Europe Awards Countdown Performance
2. Not Gonna Get Us Rehearsal

Photo Gallery

- Bonus Materials
1. Q&A with Julia and Lena
