= Dangerous and Moving =

Studio album by t.A.T.u.
- Released: 5 October 2005
- Recorded: 2004–2005
- Genres: Pop rock; Eurodance; dance-pop; alternative rock
- Length: 46:55
- Languages: English; Russian
- Label: Interscope
- Producers: Martin Kierszenbaum; Robert Orton; Sergio Galoyan; Alias; Ed Buller; Andy Kubiszewski; Trevor Horn

t.A.T.u. chronology
t.A.T.u. Remixes (2003)	Dangerous and Moving (2005)	Lyudi Invalidy (2005)

Alternative cover
- Japanese release cover

Alternative cover
- LP release cover

Singles from Dangerous and Moving
- 1. "All About Us" Released: 1 September 2005; 2. "Friend or Foe" Released: 27 December 2005; 3. "Gomenasai" Released: 1 May 2006

Dangerous and Moving is the third studio album and second English language album by Russian musical group t.A.T.u. and the English-language equivalent of the album Lyudi Invalidy ("People with disabilities"). The album was first released on 5 October 2005 in Japan then on 10 October in the United Kingdom, 11 October in North America, and in Europe and Latin America, on 14 October.

On 10 October 2025, to celebrate the 20-year anniversary of the album, a remastered deluxe edition was released digitally, including bonus tracks and remixes. On the same day, the album's Russian version was released worldwide on all streaming platforms for the first time ever, since it was previously available only in few countries, excluding Russia and Belarus due to Universal Music Group suspending their operations in those countries in 2022, following Russia's invasion of Ukraine.

== Production ==
Production on Dangerous and Moving spanned from Los Angeles to London and Moscow. There were two notable recording sessions with the record's producer, Sergio Galoyan. The first took place in Moscow between 4 and 20 August 2004 with just Lena, producing songs like "Cosmos", "Sacrifice" (one demo featuring Claire Guy) and demos "All My Love" (an English counterpart to "Вся моя любовь"), "I Know", "One Love" and "You". The second recording session took place from 17 January to 18 April 2005 in Los Angeles with "Sacrifice", "Perfect Enemy" and the demo of "We Shout" (titled "Reach Out") also sung by Lena. Yulia was not present during the recording sessions due to her pregnancy.

Other demo versions of the songs are available online, such as "All About Us" (performed by the Veronicas), "Sacrifice" (with both Yulia and Lena), "Perfect Enemy" (recorded by Claire Guy and sometimes referred to as "Wrap It Up"), and "Обезьянка ноль".

The basslines were composed by Galoyan on the Minimoog Voyager.

Although Sting, Dave Stewart, Richard Carpenter, the Veronicas and Claire Guy did work on the album, they did not actually meet the girls for production. Sergio Galoyan became a liaison for the production. However, Richard Carpenter did meet the girls after the recording of the album at their video shoot for the single Friend or Foe. The video was shot on location at Bronson Cave in Hollywood, directed by James Cox, while the executive producer was Grant Cihlar for 1171 Production Group. According to the booklet, the album was recorded at eight different recording studios. The album cover photography and design was made by their own music group, TA Music.

== Differences from Lyudi Invalidy ==
Lyudi Invalidy and Dangerous and Moving effectively have eight tracks in common, either in the form of being the same track or being English/Russian-counterparts:

- "Люди инвалиды" / "Dangerous and Moving" (49-second intro)
- "All About Us"
- "Loves Me Not"
- "Обезьянка ноль" (an English version, "Null and Void", exists but was not included; it was later released on The Best)
- "Космос" / "Cosmos (Outer Space)"
- "Ничья" / "We Shout"
- "Новая модель" / "Perfect Enemy"
- "Люди инвалиды" / "Dangerous and Moving" (full version)

Three tracks from Lyudi Invalidy do not have counterparts on Dangerous and Moving:

- "Ты согласна"
- "Вся моя любовь" (An English version, "All My Love", exists in demo form with only Lena singing but was not recorded with both girls)
- "Что не хватает"

Four tracks from Dangerous and Moving do not have counterparts on Lyudi Invalidy:

- "Friend or Foe"
- "Gomenasai"
- "Craving"
- "Sacrifice"

The tracks that the two albums have in common were all reordered, with only tracks 1 and 4 being the same between the two; however, the full versions of "Люди инвалиды" / "Dangerous and Moving" are the final tracks of both albums (track 11 on Lyudi Invalidy and track 12 on Dangerous and Moving)

On this album, "Loves Me Not" has different music than the version on the Russian album counterpart Люди-инвалиды. Among other differences, the Lyudi Invalidy version features 29 seconds of instrumentals before the lyrics start, while the Dangerous and Moving version skips straight to the lyrics; and the Dangerous and Moving version features roaring guitars during the chorus, which are absent from the Lyudi Invalidy version.

The girls sing an extra verse in "Cosmos" after the second chorus; in "Космос", this is an instrumental break with no lyrics.

== Singles ==
- "All About Us" was the lead single of the album, released in September 2005. It became a top-10 hit across Europe and the world. Peaking at number 8 in the UK Singles Chart and number 6 in the European Hot 100. Also it reached number 13 in the US Billboard Hot Dance Club Play chart. The video won Best Video MTV Russia 2006.
- "Friend or Foe" was released as the second single in December 2005. It peaked at number 33 in the European Hot 100 and number 48 in the UK Singles Chart.
- "Gomenasai" was released as the third single in Latin America and Asia and as the second in some European territories in May 2006. It wasn't released in the United States and the United Kingdom. The single reached number 59 in the European Hot 100.

== Critical reception ==
Professional ratings
Aggregate scores
Source	Rating
Metacritic	53/100
Review scores
Source	Rating
AllMusic	2/5 stars
BBC	(Positive)
The Boston Phoenix	3.5/5 stars
The Guardian	3/5 stars
IndieLondon	(Positive)
Popmatters	8/10 stars
Rolling Stone	2/5 stars
SputnikMusic	2/5 stars
Stylus Magazine	B+

Dangerous and Moving was met with "mixed or average" reviews from critics. At Metacritic, which assigns a weighted average rating out of 100 to reviews from mainstream publications, this release received an average score of 53 based on 10 reviews.

In a review for AllMusic, critic Stephen Thomas Erlewine wrote: "Since the beats are monotonous, since the songs are insipid and forgettable, since the girls not only can't sing but have no on-record charisma, since there's no sense of style and, most importantly, sense of fun to this whole enterprise, Dangerous and Moving is the worst kind of pop music: the kind that is better to theorize about than to listen to" At Rolling Stone, Barry Walters said: "Although spunky cuties Julia Volkova and Lena Katina have improved their English-pronunciation skills, the hooks they're handed this second time around are decidedly duller, and the limitations of their vocal abilities are exaggerated, not concealed, by the bluntly simplistic tunes."

== Commercial performance ==
The album was initially released on 5 October 2005 in Japan, where it peaked at number ten, a worse result than the first album 200 km/h in the Wrong Lane, which debuted at number one on the Japanese chart in 2003. In fact, the latter had sold over 500,000 copies in Japan in its first week of release alone, while Dangerous and Moving only managed to sell 23,000 copies in its first week. In Taiwan, Dangerous and Moving reached number one on the Western Albums Chart, and number four on the Combined Album Chart, dropping out of the top twenty after four weeks. As of December 2005, the album has sold 15,000 copies there, and was certified gold by Recording Industry Foundation in Taiwan.

On 10 October 2005, the album was released in the UK, on 11 October in North America and on 14 October in Europe and Latin America. In Germany, the album reached number twelve in the album chart and remained there for six weeks. In Italy, the album spent three weeks in the top twenty, entering at number eighteen and peaking at number fifteen. In France, the album stayed in the chart for twenty-three weeks, selling around 70,000 copies in 2005. In most of the remaining European countries, the album reached at least the top forty.

In the United States, the album peaked at number 131 on the Billboard 200, with a total of 93,000 certified units in the country, as of January 2010. In the UK the album spent only one week in the Official Albums Chart, peaking at number seventy-eight on 22 October 2005.

In Latin America, the album achieved more success: in Mexico, it reached number five on the Mexican albums chart, and was certified gold for shipments of 50,000 copies. In Russia the album sold 100,000 copies and was certified gold in 2005, while the Russian version, Lyudi Invalidy, was certified platinum, selling over 300,000 units.

== 2025 Deluxe Edition ==
On 31 July 2025, Interscope announced the re-release of Dangerous and Moving LP record to celebrate the 20th anniversary of the album. The deluxe set features 24 tracks with 9 Russian versions, the English version of "Obezyanka nol", "Null and Void", several remixes, and a bonus instrumental version of "Gomenasai". As an added bonus, a lithograph print of Lena and Julia is included. This marks the first new vinyl pressing of the album since its original release in 2005. The deluxe edition was finally released on digital and streaming platforms on October 10, 2025, featuring 17 remastered tracks but excluding the Russian-language songs (unlike the double LP version).

== Track listing ==
No.	Title	Lyrics	Music	Producer(s)	Length
1.	"Dangerous and Moving" (Intro)		Ivan Shapovalov	Martin Kierszenbaum; T.A. Music	0:50
2.	"All About Us"	Josh Alexander; Billy Steinberg; Jessica Origliasso; Lisa Origliasso	Alexander; Steinberg; J. Origliasso; L. Origliasso	Kierszenbaum; Robert Orton	3:00
3.	"Cosmos (Outer Space)"	Leonid Aleksandrovsky; Kierszenbaum; Valery Polienko	Sergio Galoyan	Galoyan; Kierszenbaum	4:12
4.	"Loves Me Not"	Ed Buller; Andy Kubiszewski	Buller; Kubiszewski		2:56
5.	"Friend or Foe"	Kierszenbaum; David Stewart	Kierszenbaum; Stewart	Kierszenbaum; Orton	3:08
6.	"Gomenasai"	Kierszenbaum	Kierszenbaum	Kierszenbaum; Orton	3:43
7.	"Craving (I Only Want What I Can't Have)"	Lisa Lindley Jones	Lindley Jones	Trevor Horn	3:50
8.	"Sacrifice"	Kierszenbaum	Galoyan; Kierszenbaum	Galoyan; Denis Ingoldsby; Kierszenbaum	3:10
9.	"We Shout"	Aleksandrovsky; Kierszenbaum; Pasha Nekkermann; Polienko	Nekkermann	Galoyan; Ingoldsby; Kierszenbaum	3:02
10.	"Perfect Enemy"	Kierszenbaum; T.A. Music; Polienko	Galoyan	Galoyan; Denis Ingoldsby; Kierszenbaum	4:12
11.	"Обезьянка ноль" (Obezyanka nol)	Polienko	Andrey Pokutniy; Vladimir Adarichev	Galoyan; Oliver Smallman; T.A. Music	4:25
12.	"Dangerous and Moving"	Aleksandrovsky; Kierszenbaum; T.A. Music; Polienko	Shapovalov	Kierszenbaum; T.A. Music	4:36
Total length:					41:01

Australia, Brazil, Europe, Japan, Latin America and Russia bonus track
No.	Title	Lyrics	Music	Producer(s)	Length
13.	"Вся моя любовь" (Vsya moya lyubov)	Kierszenbaum; Polienko	Galoyan	Galoyan; Denis Ingoldsby; T.A. Music	5:50
Total length:					46:51

Europe and Japan bonus track
No.	Title	Lyrics	Music	Producer(s)	Length
14.	"Люди-инвалиды" (Lyudi invalidy)	Polienko	Shapovalov	Kierszenbaum; T.A. Music	4:35
Total length:					51:26

Japan bonus track
No.	Title	Writer(s)	Producer(s)	Length
15.	"Divine"	Alias; Kierszenbaum	Alias; Kierszenbaum	3:17
Total length:				54:43

Deluxe limited edition bonus DVD
No.	Title	Length
1.	"All About Us" (The Making Of)

Japan limited edition bonus DVD
No.	Title	Length
1.	"All About Us" (Uncensored version music video)
2.	"Dangerous and Moving" (music video)
3.	"t.A.T.u. Makes a Video"
4.	"The EPK"

- The Deluxe limited edition comes with a fold-out guitar/piano music poster for "Gomenasai" and a bonus DVD containing "The Making of All About Us" video shoot (including the finished, edited video at the end of the program) and a t.A.T.u. Remix Package that has isolated stems for guitar, bass, drums, synths and vocals for the international version of the track "Loves Me Not".

=== Lyudi Invalidy (Russian version) ===
No.	Title	Lyrics	Music	Transliteration (Translation)	Length
1.	"Люди-инвалиды" (Intro, English version: Dangerous and Moving (Intro))		Ivan Shapovalov	Lyudi invalidy (Disabled People)	0:49
2.	"Новая модель" (English version: Perfect Enemy)	Valery Polienko	Sergio Galoyan	Novaya model' (New Model)	4:12
3.	"Обезьянка ноль" (English version: Null and Void)	Polienko	Vladimir Adarichev; Andrey Pokutniy	Obez'yanka nol' (Monkey Zero)	4:26
4.	"Loves Me Not"	Ed Buller; Andy Kubiszewski	Buller; Kubiszewski		3:14
5.	"Космос" (English version: Cosmos (Outer Space))	Polienko	Galoyan	Kosmos (Cosmos)	4:10
6.	"Ты согласна"	Polienko	Adarichev; Pokutniy	Ty soglasna (You Agree)	3:11
7.	"Ничья" (English version: We Shout)	Pasha Nekkermann; Polienko	Nekkermann	Nich'ya (No One's)	3:05
8.	"Вся моя любовь" (English version: All My Love)	Polienko; Martin Kierszenbaum	Galoyan	Vsya moya lyubov' (All My Love)	5:48
9.	"All About Us"	Josh Alexander; Billy Steinberg; Jessica Origliasso; Lisa Origliasso	Alexander; Steinberg; Jessica Origliasso; Lisa Origliasso		3:02
10.	"Что не хватает"	Ivan Demyan	Demyan	Chto ne khvataet (What Isn't Enough?)	4:26
11.	"Lyudi Invalidy" (English version: Dangerous and Moving)	Polienko	Shapovalov	Lyudi invalidy (Disabled People)	4:37
Total length:					40:54

== Charts ==
=== Weekly charts ===
Weekly charts for Dangerous and Moving
Chart (2005–2006)	Peak position
Austrian Albums (Ö3 Austria)	13
Belgian Albums (Ultratop Flanders)	84
Belgian Albums (Ultratop Wallonia)	85
Canadian Albums (Billboard)	91
Czech Albums (ČNS IFPI)	23
Finnish Albums (Suomen virallinen lista)	20
French Albums (SNEP)	23
German Albums (Offizielle Top 100)	12
Hungarian Albums (MAHASZ)	26
Italian Albums (FIMI)	15
Japanese Albums (Oricon)	10
Mexican Albums (Top 100 Mexico)	5
Polish Albums (ZPAV)	25
Scottish Albums (OCC)	85
Spanish Albums (PROMUSICAE)	55
Swedish Albums (Sverigetopplistan)	37
Swiss Albums (Schweizer Hitparade)	26
Taiwan Albums Chart (G-Music)	4
Taiwan International Albums Chart (G-Music)	1
UK Albums (Official Charts)	78
US Billboard 200	131

=== Year-end charts ===
2005 year-end charts for Dangerous and Moving
Chart (2005)	Position
French Albums (SNEP)	171
Mexican Albums (Top 100 Mexico)	88

== Certifications and sales ==
Region	Certification	Certified units/sales
France	—	69,100
Japan	—	38,057
Mexico (AMPROFON)	Gold	50,000^{^}
Russia	Gold	100,000
Taiwan	Gold	
United States	—	93,000
^{^} Shipments figures based on certification alone.

== Personnel / credits ==
- t.A.T.u. — Vocals
- Tom Baker — Mastering
- Ed Buller — Producer
- Cindy Cooper — Production Coordination
- Sergio Galoyan — Producer, Composer
- Trevor Horn — Producer
- Martin Kierszenbaum — Producer, A&R
- Andy Kubiszewski — Producer
- Robert Orton — Producer, Engineer, Mixing
- Phil Mucci — Photography
- T.A. Music — Design, Concept
- Tony Ugval — Engineer
- Xudoznik — Producer

== Dangerous and Moving Tour (2005–2006) ==
=== Dates ===
Date (2005)	City	Country	Venue
October 1	Paris	France	Club Med World
October 12	Tokyo	Japan	Club Asia
October 28	Moscow	Russia	Gaudi
November 17	London	England	G-A-Y
November 27	Mexico City	Mexico	Salòn 21
December 1	Buenos Aires	Argentina	Fibertel Auditory
December 6	São Paulo	Brazil	Urbano Club
December 7	Kaohsiung City	Taiwan	Cheng Shan Stadium
December 8	Taipei	Taiwan	Unknown

Date (2006)	City	Country	Venue
January 25	London	England	G-A-Y
March 18	Hamburg	Germany	NRJ Bühne
April 1 ^{(Cancelled)}	Santiago	Chile	Centro Cultural Estación Mapocho
April 11	Tallinn	Estonia	Saku Suurhall
April 12	Riga	Latvia	Unknown
April 28	St. Petersburg	Russia	SKK Arena
June 29	Mol	Belgium	Zilvermeer (Pennenzakrock 2006)
July 13	Mexico City	Mexico	Palacio De Los Deportes
July 14	Mexico City	Mexico	Palacio De Los Deportes
July 15	Guadalajara	Mexico	Arena VFG
September 2	Samara	Russia	Metallurgy Stadium
September 8	Kaliningrad	Russia	Unknown
September 19	Seoul	South Korea	Olympic Park
September 24	Krasnodar	Russia	Unknown
September 25	Rostov on Don	Russia	Unknown
September 26	Voronezh	Russia	Unknown
September 30	Kirov	Russia	Unknown
October 2	Kazan'	Russia	Unknown
October 11	Kyiv	Ukraine	Club Freedom
October 12	Kyiv	Ukraine	Palats Sportu
October 14	Dnipropetrovs'k	Ukraine	Unknown
October 31	Kirov	Russia	State Circus
November 2	Yekaterinburg	Russia	Snow Project
November 5	Volgograd	Russia	Unknown
November 7	Ufa	Russia	Unknown
November 9	Surgut	Russia	Ice Hockey Stadium
November 12	Novosibirsk	Russia	Unknown
November 14	Irkutsk	Russia	Megapolis
November 16	Yerevan	Armenia	SKK
November 19	Yaroslavl'	Russia	Arena 2000
November 30	Perm'	Russia	Unknown
December 10	Moscow	Russia	B1 Maximum Club
December 14	Vilnius	Lithuania	Siemens Arena
December 20	Chișinău	Moldova	People Club

=== Setlist ===
1. "Intro"
2. "Dangerous and Moving"/"Lyudi Invalidy"
3. "All About Us"
4. "Loves Me Not"
5. "Sacrifice"
6. "Chto Ne Khvatayet"
7. "We Shout"/"Nichya"
8. "Friend or Foe"
9. "Obezyanka Nol"
10. "Gomenasai"
11. "Perfect Enemy"/"Novaya Model"
12. "Cosmos (Outer Space)"/"Kosmos"
13. "Show Me Love"
14. "How Soon Is Now?"
15. "30 Minutes"/ "30 Minut"
16. "Not Gonna Get Us"/"Nas Ne Dagoniat"
17. "Ne ver, ne boysya"
18. "All The Things She Said"/"Ya Soshla S Uma"

== See also ==
- Dangerous and Moving Tour - The Associated Tour
- Truth: Live in St. Petersburg
