= Gomenasai (t.A.T.u. song) =

Single by t.A.T.u.

from the album Dangerous and Moving
- Released: May 1, 2006
- Recorded: February–May 2005
- Studio: Jaggo Studios (partly)
- Genre: Pop
- Length: 3:43
- Label: Interscope
- Songwriter: Martin Kierszenbaum
- Producers: Martin Kierszenbaum; Robert Orton

t.A.T.u. singles chronology
"Friend or Foe" (2005)	"Gomenasai" (2006)	"Beliy Plaschik" (2007)

Music videos
- "Gomenasai" (Animated Version) on YouTube; "Gomenasai" (Live Action Version) on YouTube

"Gomenasai" (mispronunciation of Japanese: ごめんなさい, romanized: Gomen nasai, lit. '(I'm) sorry') is a song by Russian recording duo t.A.T.u., taken from their second English language studio album Dangerous and Moving (2005). The song was written by Martin Kierszenbaum, and production was handled by Kierszenbaum and Robert Orton. It was released by Interscope in May 2006, as the album's third single. The song was not initially supposed to be a single from the studio album as t.A.T.u. did not approve; however Interscope ignored the band's wishes and went forward with the single anyway. Due to conflicts with the label, "Gomenasai" was t.A.T.u.'s last single with Interscope. (Note: Although "Gomenasai" is considered t.A.T.u.'s last single with Interscope, "Loves Me Not" was later released promotionally through the label that same year, taken from their greatest hits album The Best, which was t.A.T.u.'s final release with Interscope.)

Musically, "Gomenasai" is a pop ballad with electronic music influences. Lyrically it deals with the group saying "sorry" towards each other, using the Japanese word "Gomennasai"; hence the title. The single received mixed to favorable reviews from music critics, who felt it was gentle and one of the group's best vocal songs to date, while some felt it was similar to other ballads. The song was not issued in most countries, but had moderate success on the music charts. There were two different videos produced for this single: animated and live action.

== Background ==
The song was written by Martin Kierszenbaum, and production was handled by Kierszenbaum and Robert Orton. It was written as a response to t.A.T.u.'s Japanese audience following a sharp decline of their popularity in the country due to them abruptly cancelling their appearance on the Japanese television program Music Station in the middle of broadcast. In 2013, Katina stated that Volkova felt that the song was too soft for their rebellious image, but Katina had felt that it was necessary as a means to apologize to their Japanese audience.

The song was released in May 2006 as the album's third single by Interscope. The song was the group's last official single from the group's record labels, Interscope and Universal Russia. The group did not want to release the song as the third single, but the choice was up to their label who finally decided to release it.

Due to the further conflict, the group decided to leave the record label. The single, however was not the last release, as the group's compilation "The Best" was the final.

== Critical reception ==
"Gomenasai" received mixed reviews on critics, with some calling it more feminine and gentle. However, because the album is more upbeat and electronic, some critics claimed it didn't "fit in". Roger Holland from PopMatters liked the single labelling it "gentle" and "friendly", while James Blake from BBC Music called it a "low point".

Daniel Incognito, a staff member of Sputnikmusic had said "Gomenasai feels like a million other romantic Pop songs with stereotypical violins, soft synthesizer sounds and mushy lyrics."

== Music videos ==
=== Animated video ===
The place holder video of "Gomenasai", in the form of Japanese anime, was released late February 2006 and early March 2006 in some countries. The video starts with Yulia lying in her room, thinking about Lena, but unbeknownst to her, she was being carefully watched by a small robot. Yulia watches as Lena is being taken away by a larger robot. Yulia then changes her clothes and equips herself with weapons, then goes to start her car. While Yulia is driving the car, she finds out she is being trailed by robots. One of the robots shoots her car with a heat seeking missile, causing Yulia to lose control of her car and causing it to flip over, Yulia manages to escape and kill the robots by making her car explode by pushing a button on her waist. Meanwhile, Lena is trapped in prison by an enemy. Yulia breaks inside the enemy's fort and defeats them. The video is available through iTunes in some European countries and the United States.

=== Live action video ===
The live action video was directed by Hype Williams and was shot in Los Angeles during the week of March 13, 2006. It was filmed in the Botanical Gardens in L.A. It exudes a soft, dreamy, and beautiful feeling and is a departure from the action-packed animated video. The video shows the girls singing against a black background with shots of stone angel statues from time to time. It was released in mid/late May in Europe, Asia, South America and North Africa (2 Arabic channel).

== Track listing ==
Europe Maxi-CD single
Released May 12, 2006

1. "Gomenasai"
2. "Cosmos (Outer Space)" (She Wants Revenge Remix)
3. "Craving (I Only Want What I Can't Have)" (Bollywood Mix)
- "Gomenasai" (Music Video)

Europe CD single

1. "Gomenasai"
2. "Cosmos (Outer Space)" (She Wants Revenge Remix)

== Charts ==
Weekly chart performance for "Gomenasai"
Chart (2006)	Peak position
Austria (Ö3 Austria Top 40)	47
Belgium (Ultratip Bubbling Under Flanders)	15
CIS Airplay (TopHit)	75
Germany (GfK)	30
Russia Airplay (TopHit)	87
Ukraine Airplay (TopHit)	49

== Release history ==
Release dates and formats for "Gomenasai"
Region	Date	Format(s)	Label(s)	Ref.
Italy	1 May 2006	Digital download	Interscope	
Italy	5 May 2006	Digital download multi-track	Interscope	
Europe	12 May 2006	CD	Interscope	

== Samples ==
Samples of "Gomenasai" were used for the song "Happy Birthday" by rap group Flipsyde. It uses the lyrics "What I thought was a dream... was as real as it seemed" from Lena, "I made a mistake" from Yulia, and the piano intro. t.A.T.u. have accompanied Flipsyde while promoting Flipsyde's single and have performed together on Top of the Pops, TRL and The Dome in Germany, though t.A.T.u. did not make an appearance in Flipsyde's "Happy Birthday" music video.

Spanish rapper Porta used samples of "Gomenasai" for the song "Mi Rosa Negra".
