= Waste Management (album) =

Studio album by t.A.T.u.
- Released: 15 December 2009
- Recorded: 2007–2009
- Genres: Dance-pop; electronica
- Length: 50:18 (standard version); 60:05 (Transcendent version)
- Languages: English; Russian (1 track and 2 remixes)
- Labels: T.A.; Misterya Zvuka
- Producers: Billy Steinberg; Josh Alexander; Sergio Galoyan; Boris Renski (executive)

t.A.T.u. chronology
Vesyolye Ulybki (2008)	Waste Management (2009)	Waste Management Remixes (2011)

Singles from Waste Management
- 1. "Snowfalls" Released: 13 July 2009; 2. "White Robe" Released: 10 November 2009; 3. "Sparks" Released: 13 April 2010

Waste Management is the sixth and final studio album by Russian music duo t.A.T.u. released in Russia on 15 December 2009, by their own independent record label T.A. Music. Unlike their previous English studio album, it is the group's first studio album not released by Interscope Records due to their departure from the label in 2006.

Musically, Waste Management is electronic dance music. Upon its release, the album debuted with generally favorable reviews from music critics, who felt the production and musical composition suited the group well and considered it as one of their best releases. The album did not do well commercially, only managing to chart in Mexico and Russia, becoming the group's least successful album to date.

The studio album generated three singles: "Snowfalls", "White Robe" and "Sparks", none of which managed to generate much interest nor appear in any music charts around the world. This was the group's last studio album before they split up in March 2011. Waste Management Remixes was released not long after.

The album has been made available to music streaming platforms in 2020.

== Background and development ==
When the group announced the release of the lead single of their studio album, Весёлые Улыбки, they stated that the album would be entitled Upravleniye Otbrosami, which translates to "waste management". However, a press release had officially stated that it would be entitled Весёлые Улыбки instead, as it reflected sarcastic comments about the state of the Russian music business made by Volkova and Katina in an interview with Moscow's Time Out Magazine. Because of the name change, the album was postponed, but was eventually released in October 2008.

In March 2009, the group began production of the English version of studio album. On their Myspace account, the group stated that t.A.T.u would no longer be a "full-time project" as they wanted to focus on their solo careers. Around April 2009, the group revealed their single "Snowfalls", stating that the studio album was still in production.

According to one of the press releases from the group's website, they said that the album's title Waste Management was related to "Happy Smiles", explaining "this album was all about 'Unhappily Unsmiling' in its very essence. To be more precise, it was [Waste Management]". Member Lena Katina said on her part that it was inspired by Pink Floyd, saying "You should listen to this version of our LP non-stop at least once to feel what we tried to create. We call this version "pinkfloydish" among us".

She further explained "Pink Floyd was not the only band who did it this way, but we can say it was them who inspired us. [Waste Management] has got all songs bound together by short instrumental interludes composed by our author Evgeniy Matveitsev. This version of the LP is one continuous music trip". The group stated that they decided to do this after they visited the "concept of continuity" in their music videos "220" and "Snowfalls", which were fused together.

In the press release, member Julia Volkova revealed:

"We made our album more than just musically enriched, we have also changed its design – cover, booklet. While preparing this release we understood that everybody was a bit bored by the existed artwork. So now, instead of astronauts and Martian landscapes, look for the two trash-styled girls in shabby coats on the cover!"

== Composition and differences from Vesyolye Ulybki ==
According to AllMusic, the album is electronic dance music.

All of the original tracks from Vesyolye Ulybki were re-recorded in English for the release of Waste Management, with the exception of "Martian Eyes". English lyrics, translated from Russian by Leonid Aleksandrovsky, go far beyond the original Russian lyrics of the album.

== Release ==
Waste Management was first released in Australia, then in the United States, Japan, France, Germany, New Zealand, the United Kingdom and Mexico on December 15, 2009 by TA Music. The album was later released in Russia on Compact Disc on January 1, 2010 and later released in South America. On September 19, 2011 it was released in Belarus (see track listing below).

Waste Management was also released as a one-track version called the Transcendent version. This version is one continuous track running (on the digital release) slightly over an hour. Interludes are placed between each track to make the album sound continuous. The bonus tracks are also included, but without any interludes between them. Lena Katina calls this version "one continuous music trip" and says Pink Floyd was the main influence in the creation of this version.

The CD format of the Transcendent version was available on the tatu.ru website.

== Critical reception ==
Professional ratings
Review scores
Source	Rating
AllMusic	3.5/5 stars

Mark Fleming from AllMusic gave the album three-and-a-half stars out of five, saying "The provocative and controversial pop duo [t.A.T.u.] deliver a set of sleek electronic dance music [...] vocalists Lena Katina and Julia Volkova take their edgy musical stories to the dancefloor".

== Chart performance ==
On January 29, 2010, Billboard reported that Waste Management had sold an estimated 1,000 copies ever since its release in the United States. The album failed to chart on the US Billboard 200, becoming the duo's first studio album to do so.

Worldwide, Waste Management charted poorly, leading it to become the group's least successful album to date. It charted within the top ten in Russia and Mexico; its highest position was on the Top 100 Mexico chart, where it debuted at twenty-four, in order to eventually peak at number three on the chart.

== Singles ==
- "Snowfalls", the English version of the song "Снегопады", was released as the digital-only lead single from "Waste Management" on July 13, 2009. The Russian version also served as the fourth single of Весёлые Улыбки. The music video premiered on MTV Baltic and the official t. A.T.u YouTube channel, MySpace and iLike on July 13, 2009. The video is the same as the one for "Снегопады", dubbed with the English lyrics. The song charted at 54 in Brazil.
- The second single of the album, "White Robe", was released on November 10, 2009. The song is the English version of "Белый плащик". The song uses the same music video as the original version, but features the group lip-syncing the English lyrics instead. It didn't chart in any important music charts.
- The third single, "Sparks", premiered on MTV Brasil on April 13, 2010. The song is the English version of "220". "Sparks" peaked at no. 1 on MTV Latin America charts and the video clip weekly charts of MTV Brazil.

== Track listing ==
=== Standard version ===
No.	Title	Lyrics	Music	Length
1.	"White Robe"	Leonid Aleksandrovsky; Maria Maksakova; T.A. Music	Vanya Kilar	3:16
2.	"You and I"	Ed Buller; Andy Kubiszewski	Buller; Kubiszewski	3:16
3.	"Sparks"	Aleksandrovsky; Valery Polienko	Polienko	3:09
4.	"Snowfalls"	Aleksandrovsky; Katya Salem; T.A. Music	Slowman	3:15
5.	"Marsianskie Glaza (Марсианские глаза)" (Martian Eyes)	T.A. Music	Sergio Galoyan	3:10
6.	"Little People"	Leonid Aleksandrovsky; T.A. Music	Slowman	3:28
7.	"Waste Management"		Evgeni Matveidzev	1:45
8.	"Running Blind"	Sven Martin; Rasmus Schwenger; Lene Dissing	Julian Schramm; Larz Reinatz; Christian Behrens	3:39
9.	"Fly on the Wall"	Josh Alexander; Billy Steinberg	Alexander; Steinberg	3:59
10.	"Time of the Moon"	Aleksandrovsky; T.A. Music	Kilar	3:24
11.	"Don't Regret"	Aleksandrovsky; T.A. Music	Kilar	3:09
Total length:				50:18

Bonus tracks
No.	Title	Lyrics	Music	Length
12.	"Beliy Plaschik Fly_Dream Remix" (White Robe Fly_Dream Remix)	Maksakova; T.A. Music	Kilar	5:32
13.	"Running Blind Transformer Remix"	Martin; Schwenger; Dissing	Schramm; Reinatz; Behrens	3:53
14.	"Ne Zhaley Sniper Remix" (Don't Regret Sniper Remix)	T.A. Music	Kilar	4:58

Lena Katina has recorded a Spanish version of "Running Blind" and released it on her Spanish EP version of This Is Who I Am.

=== Transcendent version ===
No.	Title	Lyrics	Music	Length
1.	"White Robe"	Aleksandrovsky; Maksakova; T.A. Music	Kilar	3:09
2.	"You and I"	Buller; Kubiszewski	Buller; Kubiszewski	4:27
3.	"Sparks"	Aleksandrovsky; Polienko	Polienko	3:30
4.	"Snowfalls"	Aleksandrovsky; Salem; T.A. Music	Slowman	4:12
5.	"Marsianskie Glaza (Марсианские глаза)" (Martian Eyes)	T.A. Music	Galoyan	4:10
6.	"Little People"	Aleksandrovsky; T.A. Music	Slowman	4:19
7.	"Waste Management"		Evgeni Matveidzev	2:49
8.	"Running Blind"	Martin; Schwenger; Dissing	Schramm; Reinatz; Behrens	4:41
9.	"Fly on the Wall"	Alexander; Steinberg	Alexander; Steinberg	5:09
10.	"Time of the Moon"	Aleksandrovsky; T.A. Music	Kilar	4:36
11.	"Don't Regret"	Aleksandrovsky; T.A. Music	Kilar	4:26
12.	"Clock-Work" (hidden track)		Matveidzev	0:11
Total length:				60:05

Bonus tracks
No.	Title	Length
13.	"Beliy Plaschik Fly_Dream Remix" (White Robe Fly_Dream Remix)	5:32
14.	"Running Blind Transformer Remix"	3:51
15.	"Ne Zhaley Sniper Remix" (Don't Regret Sniper Remix)	4:57

- Most of the tracks are longer than the standard version due to the interludes added to tracks 2–11. The interludes are composed by Evgeni Matveidzev. The album includes a 24-page booklet. The Russian release of Waste Management is the same as the Latin American one; credits in the booklet are translated into Russian.

== Release history ==
Release dates and formats for Waste Management
Region	Date	Label	Format
United States	December 15, 2009	T.A. Music	Digital download
Australia	December 15, 2009	T.A. Music	Digital download
Japan	December 15, 2009	T.A. Music	Digital download
France	December 15, 2009	T.A. Music	Digital download
Germany	December 15, 2009	T.A. Music	Digital download
United Kingdom	December 15, 2009	T.A. Music	Digital download
Mexico	December 15, 2009	T.A. Music	Digital download
Russia	January 1, 2010	Misterya Zvuka	CD
Brazil	January 15, 2010	Coqueiro Verde	CD
Argentina	February 1, 2010	Coqueiro Verde	CD
Chile	February 1, 2010	Coqueiro Verde	CD
Colombia	March 8, 2010	Coqueiro Verde	CD
Worldwide	August 28, 2020	T.A. Music	Streaming

== See also ==
- Vesyolye Ulybki / Happy Smiles
- Dangerous and Moving
