= Laguna Beach season 3 =

Laguna Beach
- Season 3
- No. of episodes: 16

Release
- Original network: MTV
- Original release: August 16 – November 15, 2006

The third and final season of Laguna Beach: The Real Orange County, an American reality television series, consists of 16 episodes and was broadcast on MTV. It aired from August 16, 2006, until November 15, 2006. The season was filmed from December 2005 to August 2006, primarily in Laguna Beach, California, with additional footage in Los Angeles. The executive producer was Tony DiSanto.

Laguna Beach focuses on the lives of rich teenagers from Laguna Beach, California. The teens attend Laguna Beach High School. Cameron is the bad boy that always gets what he wants, and Chase is trying to balance his school life along with his music career. Tessa wants to be a priority to Chase but he is so caught up in his own life to notice her.

== Synopsis ==
With the first-generation cast had graduated and departed Laguna Beach, this season focuses a new generation of juniors and seniors as they navigate their way through their own drama, relationships, friendships and making crucial decisions for their future.

== Episodes ==
No.	Title	Original release date	Prod. code
30	"The Thrill of the Hunt"	August 16, 2006	301
Back on the sunny beaches of California, Laguna's next generation doesn't waste anytime ranking on the drama-meter. The girls are occupied with Kyndra's barbecue and, more importantly, Cameron- who already has his mind on playing the field with Laguna's ladies.
31	"Who Wants to Date a Rock Star??"	August 23, 2006	302
Rocky throws Tessa a surprise birthday party but it's Chase who delivers Tessa the best present. Meanwhile, the Kyndra/Cameron relationship heats up behind Jessica's back.
32	"We're Gonna Crash a Party"	August 30, 2006	303
Christmas in Laguna heats up when Kyndra and Cami crash Rocky's holiday party. Meanwhile, Cameron gets defensive about his relationship with Jessica.
33	"Old Friends, New Crushes"	September 6, 2006	304
Breanna reaches out to her former best friend Raquel in hopes to repair their relationship, but things don't go smoothly. Meanwhile, Chase arranges for a double date so his pal Kelan can go after his long-time crush, Lexie.
34	"Kiss and Don't Tell"	September 13, 2006	305
When Tessa and Rocky travel to San Diego for a modeling gig for Tessa, Cameron decides to tag along. Sparks fly between him and Tessa, but will Jessica find out?
35	"Headed for Heartbreak"	September 20, 2006	306
It's Cameron's birthday but it's Tessa who is surprised when she realizes that Cameron has a totally different take on their hookup. Meanwhile, Kyndra rekindles her rocky romance with her ex-boyfriend, Tyler.
36	"Hook Ups and Cover-Ups"	September 27, 2006	307
Kyndra risks her relationship with Tyler when she gets a little too cozy with Cameron at Winter Formal. Will she be able to convince everyone nothing happened including Tyler’s little sister, Nikki, before she tells?
37	"Spies, Lies, and Alibis"	October 4, 2006	308
Kyndra tries to calm the rumor mill by hosting a Valentine’s Day dinner party with Tyler, but tensions flare when Cameron shows up. Meanwhile, Rocky takes it to another level with Alex on their romantic night out.
38	"First Date, Last Date"	October 11, 2006	309
In Laguna, it seems there are always new relationships sparking up as others fade away. It's no different now, as Tessa goes on a date with Cameron's friend Derek at the same time Jessica and Cameron head in different directions.
39	"It's, Like, Break-Up Season"	October 18, 2006	310
While schemers Kyndra and Cami put down Tessa and Derek's relationship, it seems there is also trouble in paradise for Raquel and Alex. After feeling pressure from Raquel, Alex decides to call it quits at the group's bonfire.
40	"The Three Day Rule"	October 25, 2006	311
Major tears erupt when Rocky and Alex see each other at a concert by Chase's band. Alex is not happy after seeing Rocky interact with other guys. He accuses her of being a slut. This tears Rocky apart and she slowly breaksdown. Meanwhile, Tessa's new relationship starts to chill when Derek gives her the cold shoulder.
41	"Only in Cabo"	November 1, 2006	312
Spring Break has finally arrived. Kyndra plans on a girls' week vacation, but Tyler shows up. Meanwhile, Derek (Tessa's ex-boyfriend) wastes no time in aiming to get close to her number one enemy, Breanna.
42	"You Don't Just Get Me Back"	November 8, 2006	313
It's prom week and all the girls are waiting to get asked, Lexie gets asked by Derek but states that she won't hook up with him, neither Tara with Cameron, the prom pre-party was at Lexie's house. Alex realizes he made a mistake and get back together with Rocky. However, during the prom, Alex (Raquel's boyfriend) disappears and they start fighting at Derek's house, where the post-party takes place, Tessa and Derek hooked up again.
43	"Show Them What You've Got"	November 8, 2006	314
It's time for Open Air Stereo to play their songs to some important executives of Epic Records in a small concert. Derek is back with Tessa and Breanna is kind of jealous because they start kissing in front of her face. Open Air Stereo gets the record deal and they tell everyone what they have achieved.
44–45	"See You In A Decade"	November 15, 2006	315/316
Graduation is just around the corner and that means that Chase, Kelan, Derek and Nick G. are leaving for good. Cameron is kind of depressed because all of his friends are leaving. Kyndra and Cami go to the ceremony and start cheering up their friends. Kyndra and Cameron planned on a BBQ at Cameron's and Kyndra with Cami made a slideshow for them. Breanna writes a letter to Raquel telling her how she wants to begin her life anew; they agree that it is time to grow up and move on. Raquel is afraid that Alex is going to leave her for college girls but later they plan on enjoying every moment they have left. Raquel tells Tessa how hard she and Breanna are trying to be friends again, Tessa looks disappointed because her rift with LC's sister. Kyndra, Cami, Candace, Tara and Lexie, go lunching and talk about how excited they are for starting senior year. Tessa feels her world is falling apart because she lost Raquel and by hearing a voice mail from Chase she understands that she has lost him too.
