= Loves Me Not =

Promotional single by t.A.T.u.

from the album The Best
- Released: 13 September 2006 (UK)
- Recorded: March 2005
- Genre: Alternative rock; electronic rock; Eurodance
- Length: 2:56
- Label: Interscope
- Songwriters: Ed Buller; Andy Kubiszewski
- Producers: Ed Buller; Andy Kubiszewski; Martin Kierszenbaum

"Loves Me Not" is a song by Russian music duo t.A.T.u.. It was a planned fourth single for the album Dangerous and Moving. However, due to the group leaving Universal Records, the song's release was postponed, then later cancelled in all countries, except France, where it received a limited release. A very small number of singles were printed and sold in France, using the same photo from the "Gomenasai" single.

Unlike most of the duo's songs, "Loves Me Not" and "All About Us" exist exclusively in English; there is no Russian-language version of either song, and English versions were included on the Russian version of the album. A video of the group performing the song at "Glam As You" in Paris was aired on a few television stations worldwide. The music and lyrics were composed by Andy Kubiszewski and Ed Buller, while the cover photo for the single release was taken by Bryan Adams.

Two versions of the song were released: a dance/electro version that can be found on Lyudi Invalidy (Люди Инвалиды), and a rock version that appears on Dangerous and Moving.

== Track listing ==
- France Promo CD single
1. "Loves Me Not" (02:56)
2. "Loves Me Not (Glam As You Radio Mix By Guéna LG)" (03:12)
3. "Loves Me Not (Glam As You Mix By Guéna LG)" (06:05)
4. "Loves Me Not (Sunset In Ibiza By Guéna LG)" (04:35)
- European Promo CD single
1. "Loves Me Not" (02:56)
2. "Loves Me Not (Glam As You Radio Mix By Guéna LG)" (03:12)

== Charts ==
=== Weekly charts ===
Weekly chart performance for "Loves Me Not"
| Chart (2006) | Peak position |
|---|---|
| CIS Airplay (TopHit) | 33 |
| Russia Airplay (TopHit) | 28 |
| Slovakia (Rádio Top 100) | 40 |
| Ukraine Airplay (TopHit) | 69 |

=== Year-end charts ===
2006 year-end chart performance for "Loves Me Not"
| Chart (2006) | Position |
|---|---|
| CIS (TopHit) | 196 |
| Russia Airplay (TopHit) | 189 |
