= Vesyolye Ulybki =

Весёлые Улыбки

Studio album by t.A.T.u.
- Released: 21 October 2008
- Recorded: 2007–2008
- Genres: Eurodance; electronica; electronic rock; pop rock
- Length: 38:54
- Languages: Russian; English (3 tracks)
- Label: Studia Soyuz
- Producers: T.A. Music; Billy Steinberg; Josh Alexander; Sergio Galoyan

T.A.T.u. chronology
The Best (2006)	Весёлые Улыбки (2008)	Waste Management (2009)

Alternative covers
- iTunes cover

Singles from Весёлые Улыбки
- 1. "Beliy Plaschik" Released: 29 November 2007; 2. "220" Released: 15 April 2008; 3. "You and I" Released: 12 September 2008; 4. "Snegopady" Released: 17 April 2009

Professional ratings
Review scores
Source	Rating
Newsmusic.ru	7/10 stars
Sputnikmusic	2.0/5

Vesyolye Ulybki (Cyrillic: Весёлые Улыбки; translation: Happy Smiles) is the fifth studio album and final Russian language album by Russian music duo t.A.T.u., released on 21 October 2008. The album was no longer handled by their primary producers and songwriters, which included Martin Kierszenbaum and Trevor Horn. Instead, it was produced by producers including Billy Steinberg, Josh Alexander, Sergio Galoyan. The album's working title was Upravleniye Otbrosami (Cyrillic: Управление Отбросами; translation: Waste Management). The album reached sales of more than 250,000 copies in Russia. The English counterpart, Waste Management, was released in December 2009.

The album was made available to music streaming platforms in 2020.

== Background and development ==
The duo began recording the third Russian-language album, alongside its English counterpart, in early 2007 in Germany. All the Russian-language tracks were completed on 28 September 2007. The album's title was announced to be Upravleniye Otbrosami, which translates to "Waste Management", and was originally scheduled to be released in June 2008. However, a press release had officially stated that it would be entitled Весёлые Улыбки instead, as it reflected sarcastic comments about the state of the Russian music business made by Volkova and Katina in an interview with Moscow's Time Out Magazine. Because of the name change, the album's release date was postponed to October 2008. Nonetheless, the album's original title would still be used for the English counterpart, released a year later.

== Singles ==
- The first single from the album, "Белый плащик", was released in November 2007. The music video was released on 29 November 2007. The single was released as a maxi-single with the song, remixes, and the second single, "220". It also had mobile wallpapers, a poster and a coupon for a discount of 50 roubles for the Upravleniye Otbrosami album, which expired in June 2008, but they were still valid for the discount of the album upon the change of its name to Весёлые Улыбки
- The second single, "220", was released in April 2008. The song was included in the "Beliy Plaschik" maxi-single and featured 3 mobile wallpapers. A music video was released in June 2008 that featured the group in 'burlesque'-styled costumes, dancing and singing to the song.
- The third single, "You and I", was released in September 2008 It was the theme song for the drama film of the same name, which is a loose adaptation of the novel t.A.T.u. Come Back.
- The fourth single, "Снегопады", was released in April 2009. The music video was designed as a continuation of the "220" music video, and a few alternate versions were posted on t.A.T.u.'s official YouTube channel.

== Track listing ==
No.	Title	Lyrics	Music	Translation	Length
1.	"Intro"		Vanya Kilar		3:09
2.	"Белый плащик" (Beliy Plaschik)	Maria Maksakova; T.A. Music	Kilar	White Robe	3:14
3.	"You and I"	Ed Buller; Andy Kubiszewski	Buller; Kubiszewski		3:16
4.	"Снегопады" (Snegopady)	Katya Salem; T.A. Music	Slowman	Snowfalls	3:15
5.	"220"	Valery Polienko	Polienko		3:07
6.	"Марсианские глаза" (Marsianskie Glaza)	T.A. Music	Sergio Galoyan	Martian Eyes	3:10
7.	"Человечки" (Chelovechki)	T.A. Music	Slowman	Little People	3:27
8.	"Весёлые улыбки" (Vesyolye Ulybki)		Evgeni Matveidzev	Happy Smiles	2:04
9.	"Running Blind"	Sven Martin; Rasmus Schwenger; Lene Dissing	Julian Schramm; Larz Reinatz; Christian Behrens		3:39
10.	"Fly on the Wall"	Josh Alexander; Billy Steinberg	Alexander; Steinberg		3:59
11.	"Время луны" (Vremya Luny)	T.A. Music	Kilar	Time of the Moon	3:23
12.	"Не жалей" (Ne Zhaley)	T.A. Music	Kilar	Don't Regret	3:06
Total length:					38:54

== Release history ==
Region	Date	Label	Format
Russia	17 October 2008	Soyuz	Pre-order download
Russia	21 October 2008	Soyuz	CD
Worldwide	21 October 2008	Soyuz	Digital download

== Notes ==
- "Intro" is an instrumental version of "Не жалей".
- "Весёлые улыбки" is the same instrumental track as "Waste Management" on the Waste Management album.
- Lena Katina has recorded a Spanish version of "Running Blind" and released it on her Spanish EP version of This Is Who I Am.
