= T.A.T.u. =

Russian pop singer duo

t.A.T.u.
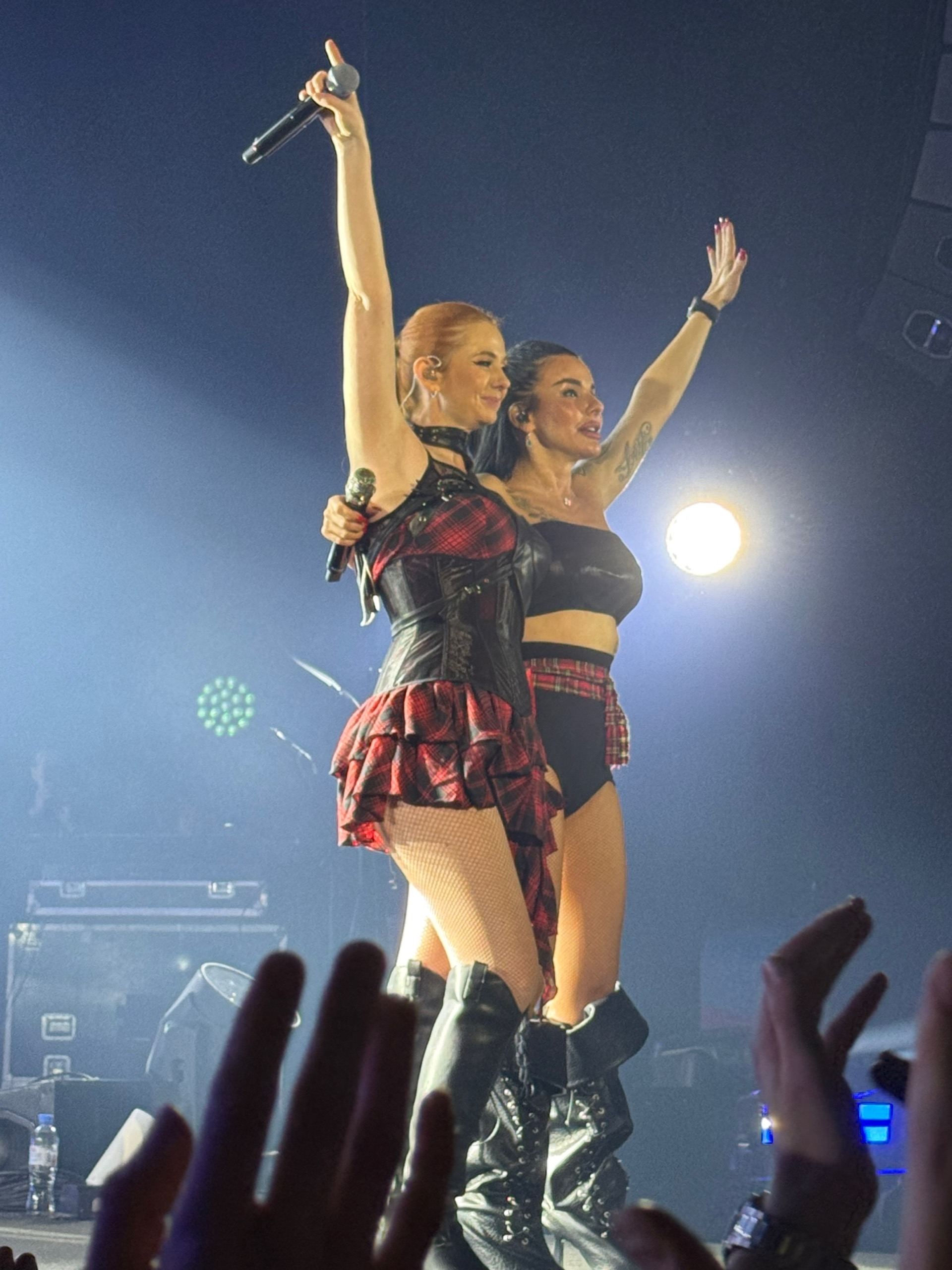
- Katina (left) and Volkova (right) in 2026

Background information
- Origin: Moscow, Russia
- Genres: Pop; pop rock; Europop; electronic
- Years active: 1999–2011; 2025–present
- Labels: Neformat; Interscope; Universal Music Russia; Soyuz
- Members: Lena Katina; Julia Volkova
- Website: tatugirls.com

t.A.T.u. (Russian: Тату, pronounced [tɐˈtu], a wordplay on the Russian words ta (that [girl]) and tu (that [girl]), meaning "this [girl] loves that [girl]", rather than a reference to a tattoo) are a Russian pop duo consisting of Lena Katina and Julia Volkova. The two started out as part of the children's musical group Neposedy before being managed by producer and director Ivan Shapovalov and signing with Russian record label Neformat. t.A.T.u.'s debut album 200 Po Vstrechnoy (2001) was a commercial success in Eastern Europe, and that resulted in the duo signing with Interscope Records to release its English-language counterpart, 200 km/h in the Wrong Lane (2002). The album was certified platinum by the IFPI for one million copies sold in Europe and became the first album by a foreign group to reach number one in Japan. (Note: Although Billboard claimed t.A.T.u. as the first non-Japanese act to debut at number one in Japan, South Korean singer BoA was the first artist overall to achieve such feat in 2002 with her debut Japanese album Listen to My Heart—the singer's second Japanese album Valenti also reached number one on its first week in 2003, one month before t.A.T.u.'s Japanese debut. According to Oricon, t.A.T.u. became the first foreign group to reach number one with their self-titled Japanese debut album. The album had peaked at number three in its first week on the Oricon Albums Chart.) It was also certified gold in the United States and the United Kingdom, and included the international hits "All the Things She Said" and "Not Gonna Get Us". The duo represented Russia in the Eurovision Song Contest 2003 with the song "Ne ver, ne boysya", finishing third.

t.A.T.u. released their second international album, Dangerous and Moving, alongside its Russian equivalent, Lyudi Invalidy, in 2005, with the group reaching moderate success after parting ways with Shapovalov. The former was promoted with the international hit "All About Us". The duo ventured into other projects, such as creating their own production company T.A. Music and promoting the film inspired by their story, You and I (2008). Their last pair of albums, Vesyolye Ulybki and Waste Management, followed in 2008 and 2009 respectively. t.A.T.u. officially broke up in 2011, with Katina and Volkova pursuing solo careers. In subsequent years, they have reunited several times to perform, most notably at the opening ceremony of the 2014 Winter Olympics in Sochi. In 2025, t.A.T.u. became active again as a duo.

== History ==
=== 1999: Formation ===
The wordmark logo of t.A.T.u.

Before production of t.A.T.u. began, the pair were in a group named Neposedy. Both Lena Katina and Julia Volkova were part of the band, along with future Russian artists such as Sergey Lazarev and Vlad Topalov. Katina was also in a band named Avenue between 1994 and 1997. It was reported that Volkova was ejected from Neposedy amid claims she was misbehaving and disrupting other members in the group, along with being accused of smoking, swearing and drinking. However, Neposedy denied the claims and said that Volkova aged out of the group.

t.A.T.u. were formed in 1999 by Ivan Shapovalov and his friend and business partner Aleksandr Voytinskiy, who developed plans to create a musical project in Russia. With this idea in mind, Shapovalov and Voitinskiy organized auditions in Moscow in early 1999 for teenage female vocalists. By the end of auditioning, the partners narrowed their search down to ten girls, including Katina and Volkova. Katina and Volkova knew each other before the auditions. Both girls stood out among the others because of their appearance and vocal experience, but the producers decided to start with 14-year-old Katina, who sang "It Must Have Been Love" by Roxette. Katina began recording demos, including "Yugoslavia", a protest song about the NATO bombing of Yugoslavia. After the demos were cut, Shapovalov insisted that another girl be added to the project. Thus, in late 1999, 14-year-old Julia Volkova was added to the group to complete the duo. She also started recording not long after Katina's "Yugoslavia" demo was finished.

According to Katina, Shapovalov was inspired to create the duo after the release of the Swedish film Show Me Love which focused on the romance between two school girls. After completing the duo, the producers decided on the name "Тату" (Tatu). Sounding like the English word "tattoo", it is also a shortened version of the Russian phrase "Та любит ту" (ta lyubit tu), meaning "This [girl] loves that [girl]".

=== 2000–2002: 200 Po Vstrechnoy ===
Over the next year, Katina and Volkova recorded songs with their producers. Voitinskiy left the project, stating that he was unwilling to support one built around scandals, and Shapovalov signed Elena Kiper as co-producer and co-writer for their debut album.

The first single was completed in 2000, titled "Ya Soshla S Uma" (later released in English as "All the Things She Said"), which was officially issued as a CD maxi single in December of that year. The song describes the turmoil in a girl's soul because she is in love with another girl, but is afraid, as society frowns upon this. She asks her parents for forgiveness. Elena Kiper has been credited with the song, explaining that the idea came to her when she fell asleep at her dentist's office and had a dream in which she kissed another woman. She woke up saying out loud, "Я сошла с ума!" (Ya soshla s uma, meaning "I've lost my mind"). Ivan Shapovalov is said to have added the second phrase of the chorus, "Мне нужна она" (Mne nuzhna ona, meaning "I need her"). The song remained at the top of the Russian charts for over four months, and the music video won the MTV Video Music Award among the Russian nominees of 2001, marking the group's first nomination and win at the ceremony.

In May 2001, the duo signed with Universal Music Russia for the release of their first album, 200 Po Vstrechnoy. It was issued on 21 May 2001, gaining considerable success in Eastern European markets. It went on to reach platinum status in Europe, with over one million copies certified by International Federation of the Phonographic Industry — an achievement never before attained by any artist from the Eastern countries. Their second single, "Nas Ne Dogonyat", came out the same day as the album, and it was only released in music video form rather than as an official CD single, although a promotional conjoined "Ya Soshla s Uma/Nas Ne Dagonyat" was released in Poland. This was followed by the third single "30 Minut" in September, only available as a music video. A new edition of the album was reissued on 15 February 2002, featuring, in addition to the original tracks, the song "Klouny" and two previously unreleased remixes. In its first week alone, the reissue sold more than 60,000 copies. The original Russian album was eventually released in Japan in September 2003.

The lyrics of their songs, the related music videos, and their on-stage kisses performed during their shows suggested a romantic and homosexual relationship between the two girls. On several occasions, during interviews, they claimed that the relationship was real, offering details about their sex life, but more often the singers preferred to dodge questions about their sexual preferences, stating that they did not like labels.

The group went on tour in 2001, performing routines that were described as 'precise' and included scenes in which the girls had to strip. The tour appeared in countries including Germany, Bulgaria, Slovakia, the Czech Republic, and Israel, ending in 2002. In early summer 2002, the duo released the new single "Prostye Dvizheniya", which was not part of the duo's debut album. The music video was censored in Russia due to the depiction of Volkova, who was seventeen at the time, in an extended masturbation scene in a bathtub.

=== 2002–2003: 200 km/h in the Wrong Lane and Eurovision ===
In early 2002, the duo signed with American record label Interscope Records for the release of an English-language version of their debut album. The American music executive Jimmy Iovine asked the English producer Trevor Horn to create adaptations of Tatu's songs. Horn wrote new lyrics for "All the Things She Said" and "Not Gonna Get Us" and coached the duo to sing them in English. He also rerecorded the instruments, as he did not have access to the original multitracks. He described Shapovalov as "awful" and removed him from the sessions after he made the girls cry. Horn said later: "There's no shortcut, you can't bully people." The group was "controlled" by Shapovalov and it was reported that he was "strict" during the process of making the album.

In July 2002, Blender praised the group by saying "We have seen the future of rock & roll ... to say you've never seen or heard anything quite like it is a colossal understatement." The following month, for the release of their first English-language album, Tatu decided to go by t.A.T.u., using uppercase letters and periods to distinguish themselves from an already existing Australian band, Tatu.

The English version of the album was released in October 2002 in Europe as 200 km/h in the Wrong Lane, and it went on to sell over five million copies worldwide. The first single from the album was "All the Things She Said" which was released in late summer 2002. The song peaked at the top spot in countries such as Australia, Denmark, Germany, Ireland, Italy, New Zealand, Norway, Spain, Switzerland and the United Kingdom. The music video caused controversy worldwide, due to the members, who were both 15 at the time of the video's production, kissing behind a fence. Some believed the video promoted lesbianism and pedophilia and some branded the group's music as "paedophilic pop". Numerous live performances were also subject to censorship, particularly because of the kisses the two members exchanged on stage.

In the United States and Canada the album was released on 10 December 2002. The same month t.A.T.u. were heralded by The Face magazine as "The hottest popstars in the world right now." While promoting the album in America, they performed wearing T-shirts with a pacifist slogan, used as a protest against the Iraq War, causing controversy. On 25 February 2003 the women mocked NBC's insistence that they neither kiss nor comment on the Iraq War by performing "All the Things She Said" in white "T-shirts that bore the Russian language message Khuy Voyne! (Fuck the war!) across the front", and by kissing during their performance. The following day, they performed on Jimmy Kimmel Live!, known for its uncensored style, but the two girls wore different T-shirts with the word 'Censored' and even covered their faces with their hands during the kiss in the performance, as a form of protest. They still wrote the term on Jimmy Kimmel's hand.

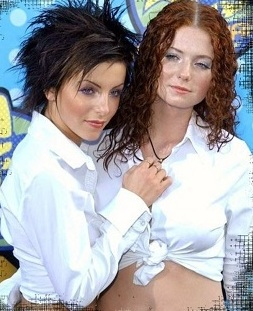
t.A.T.u. at the 2003 MTV Movie Awards

The next single "Not Gonna Get Us" was released in early 2003. Though not as popular as their debut single, it managed to have success in most record charts. The song also reached number one on the US Billboard Dance Club Songs, becoming the duo's only number-one single on the US component charts. The group then released their third single "30 Minutes", which premiered only in Europe. A music video followed after the release. The fourth single, "How Soon Is Now?", was a cover of the song by the Smiths and came out in May 2003. The same month, Shapovalov was arrested after arranging filming for the group's music video "Show Me Love" in Moscow's Red Square despite his application for filming being refused. Shapovalov also attempted to film near London's Big Ben and various other locations. The footage that was recorded was later used for a music video for the song "Show Me Love", despite the song not being released in any country other than Poland.

Also in May 2003, t.A.T.u. represented Russia at Eurovision Song Contest 2003 with the song "Ne ver, ne boysya", where they placed third. After the contest, Russia's Channel One complained that Irish broadcaster RTÉ (Ireland's national television broadcaster) had used a back-up jury, and that it had cost them victory; RTÉ did not use the televoting results after some network problems. A statement by Channel One suggested that there were grounds to believe that the contest results could be much different for Russia. RTÉ responded by publishing the unused results of the Irish televote, which showed that had the jury not been used, Turkey, whose entry was also overlooked by the Irish Jury, would still have won. The group's record label, Universal Music Russia, were originally against the group's participation saying that the Eurovision contest was for "young artists" and said "artists of t.A.T.u.'s level will not get much out of the participation in it, We [Universal] would much rather prefer the group to work on their new album, and not to participate in contests for rising stars [...]" Soon after the conclusion of Eurovision, the group was invited to the 2003 MTV Movie Awards, where they performed "All the Things She Said" and "Not Gonna Get Us".

On 26 September 2003, the group released a remix compilation, titled Remixes. "Prostiye Dvizheniya", the controversial single that came out in Russia in summer 2002, and "Ne ver, ne boysya", their entry for the Eurovision Song Contest 2003, were included as bonus tracks on the Russian edition of the compilation. In October, t.A.T.u. received three World Music Awards for Best Pop Group, Best Dance Group, and Best Duo. A DVD compilation, titled Screaming for More, was released on 24 November 2003, featuring music videos and behind-the-scenes.

Anatomy of t.A.T.u., a documentary portraying the duo's public image directed by Vitaly Mansky, aired on Russian television on 12 December 2003. The documentary revealed that the girls were not lesbians, and followed the group during their US promo tour earlier that year.

=== 2004–2006: Dangerous and Moving and Lyudi Invalidy ===
In early 2004, t.A.T.u. legally broke their contract with Ivan Shapovalov and Neformat. In the months before the split, t.A.T.u. and Shapovalov were being filmed for a reality show on STS in Russia titled Podnebesnaya. The show followed the group as they were recording their second album, to little success, with their producer Ivan Shapovalov. The documentary aired on Russian television from January to March 2004.

There were many rumors around the split until the show aired, which depicted the group leaving due to a lack of interest and care from their producer. They also claimed the quality of the music being produced was too low, and that Shapovalov was only interested in creating scandals. Volkova stated, "He [Ivan] spends his time thinking up scandals instead of planning our artistic work. I'm sure our fans would rather hear new songs and new albums than new scandals." Katina then stated, "He made us out to BE lesbians when we were just singing FOR lesbians. We wanted people to understand them and not judge them. That they are as free as anyone else." In one of the final episodes, Volkova mentioned returning to the United States in spring of 2004 to record with new producers. However, she became pregnant soon thereafter, and recording was delayed.

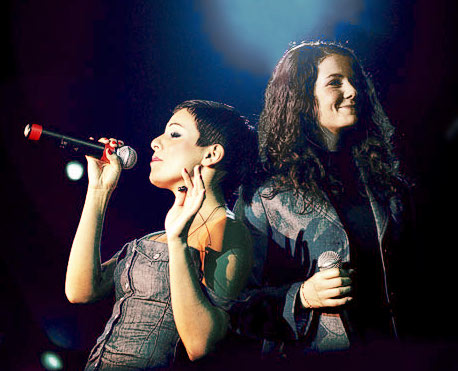
t.A.T.u. performing in October 2005

Volkova soon joined Katina and previous producer Sergio Galoyan in the studio. The group was backed by their record label, Universal Music International, in finding adequate songs and production to release a new album. In August 2005, "All About Us" and "Lyudi Invalidy" were announced to be the first singles from the English and Russian albums, respectively. "All About Us" was a worldwide hit, charting in the top ten in the majority of European charts. The group released their second English album on 11 October 2005 titled Dangerous and Moving. Its Russian counterpart was released on 19 October, titled Lyudi Invalidy. The second single was "Friend or Foe", featuring Sting on bass guitar. Soon after the video was released, the group's management replaced drummer Roman Ratej with Steve "Boomstick" Wilson, and appointed a new bassist, Domen Vajevec. Towards the end of the year, they began promoting both albums worldwide, launching their Dangerous and Moving Tour.

On 25 March 2006, t.A.T.u. received the award for Best Group at the first edition of the TRL Awards. On 17 April 2006, t.A.T.u. returned to reality TV in Russia with t.A.T.u. Expedition, which was broadcast on the Russian music channel Muz-TV. It chronicled the release of their second album, and the recording of the video for their third single, "Gomenasai", which was released shortly after the end of the show. The video, as well as the actual song, is quite a departure from t.A.T.u.'s usual style and leaves many of their fans cold. t.A.T.u. performed in Saint Petersburg, Russia, on 28 April, and the concert was recorded with the intention of being released on DVD later that year; however, its release was repeatedly postponed.

On 30 August 2006, the official website announced that the girls had left their record company, Universal/Interscope. In September 2006 the duo's most successful songs were included in the greatest hits album The Best, t.A.T.u.'s final release under their former label. The only single from the album was "Loves Me Not", which, however, was released promotionally in only few European countries. Although the song had already appeared on Dangerous and Moving, it is regarded as the first and only single from The Best.

On 21 November 2006, the region of the Komi Republic in Russia filed a lawsuit against t.A.T.u. over the album and song "Lyudi Invalidy" due to the title translating to "disabled people". Leonid Vakuev, a human rights representative for the Komi Republic, interpreted the song as being directed towards disabled people and cited words written in the booklet for the album, which said: "[Lyudi Invalidy] do not know what it means to be a human being. They are fakes inside the human form. They do not live, but — function". Katina said, "Of course, we meant moral invalids, people who do not have [a] soul and human feelings." When asked if they had anything against disabled people, she stated that she finds it offensive to refer to people by that term, and added, "We take pictures together and make sure they have priority seats [at concerts]."

In 2006, Russian politician Aleksey Mitrofanov proposed t.A.T.u. to be awarded the Order of Friendship, but the State Duma vetoed his idea. Mitrofanov came to write a novel inspired by the duo, t.A.T.u. Come Back (Russian: ТАТУ КАМ БЭК), which was later adapted into the film You and I.

=== 2007–2010: Vesyolye Ulybki, Waste Management and hiatus ===
The duo began recording the third Russian-language album, alongside its English counterpart, in early 2007 in Germany. All the Russian-language tracks were completed on 28 September 2007. In the same month, the group released the concert DVD "Truth: Live in St. Petersburg", which was available exclusively in Japan. It marked the group's first release since leaving Universal.

In late 2007, "Beliy Plaschik", the lead single from their upcoming Russian-language album, was released. The project was then known as Upravleniye Otbrosami, which translates to "Waste Management", and was scheduled to hit the stores in June 2008. The second single, "220" ("Dvesti Dvadtsat'"), made its radio premiere in April 2008, and the music video was released on their official YouTube channel on 5 June 2008. "Beliy Plaschik" and "220" were the main attractions on a special release known as "Hyperion-Plate", the first-ever EP from the duo. The EP was released on 8 May 2008 and featured multimedia content including music, video, ringtones and wallpapers.

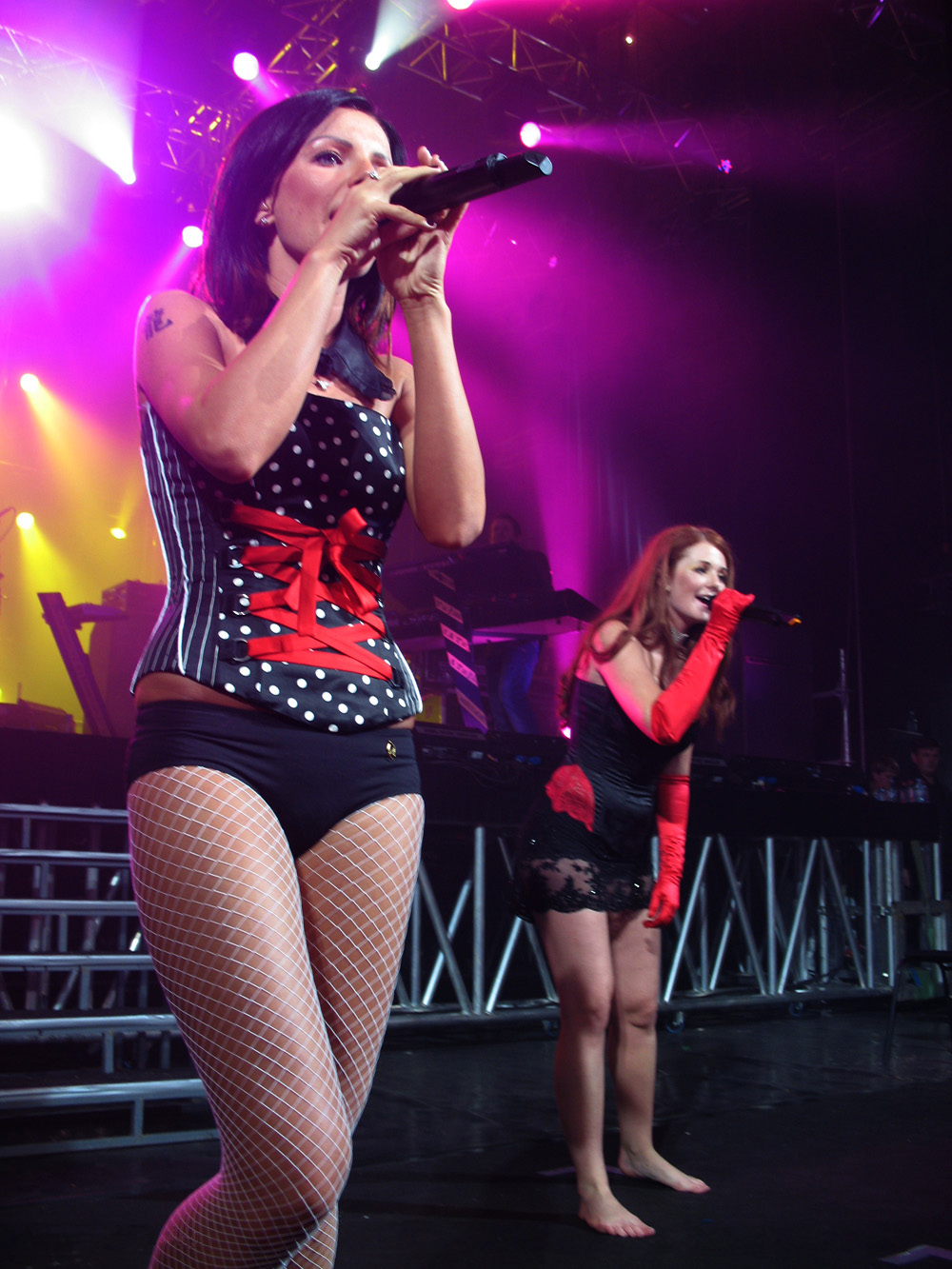
t.A.T.u in 2008

Also in May 2008, t.A.T.u. attended the 61st Cannes Film Festival alongside actress Mischa Barton to present the film You and I, directed by Roland Joffé and inspired by the book t.A.T.u. Come Back by Russian State Duma member Aleksey Mitrofanov, with Barton and Shantel VanSanten in the lead roles; both Katina and Volkova make cameo appearances in the film, which was shot in 2007.

On 9 September 2008, a press release appeared on the duo's official website that declared that the forthcoming album would be titled Vesyolye Ulybki ("Happy Smiles") instead of Upravleniye Otbrosami ("Waste Management"). The name change reflected sarcastic comments about the state of the Russian music business made by Volkova and Katina in an interview with Moscow's Time Out magazine. On 12 September, the album's third single, "You and I" made its radio debut in Russia.

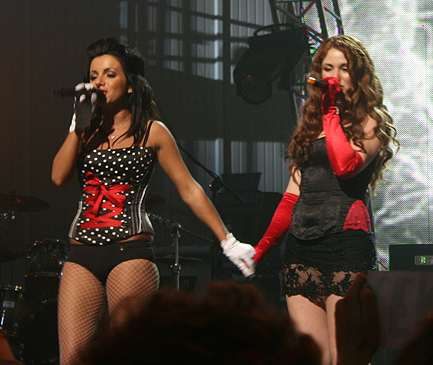
t.A.T.u. performing at the Viva Comet Awards in 2008

On 15 October, t.A.T.u.'s website announced that Vesyolye Ulybki would be released on 21 October 2008. The songs were also made available internationally through the iTunes digital music store. Upon its release, t.A.T.u. were also the subjects of an ongoing mini-reality series on the website Russia.ru., to promote their new project. On 28 November, they were awarded the Legend of MTV at the MTV Russia Music Awards 2008.

In March 2009, a statement was released on the duo's site and Myspace stating that t.A.T.u. will no longer be a "full-time" project and that Katina and Volkova were working on solo careers. Despite the hiatus, the album's fourth single "Snegopady" was released, along with its music video. The girls also performed their 2003 song "Ne ver, ne boysya" at the Eurovision Song Contest 2009 on 10 May. They were also included as an interval act on the 12th at the first semifinals, performing Not Gonna Get Us with the Russian Army Choir.

On 13 July, the group released their single "Snowfalls", taken from the English version of the album, Waste Management, which was originally scheduled for release in 2008 but was postponed for unknown reasons. The song was issued digitally worldwide, along with its music video. The group's second single for the album, "White Robe", was released by Coqueiro Verde Records online and premiered on t.A.T.u.'s YouTube account. The album was eventually released worldwide digitally on 15 December 2009, and received favorable reception from critics. However, it did not sell very well and was reported to have only sold over 1,000 copies in the United States, as of January 2010. The third single off the album, "Sparks", was released in Brazil and on t.A.T.u.'s official YouTube account on 13 April 2010.

Volkova made headlines in Russia with an interview in which she expressed her opinion on Katina's solo career, "She has the right to [sing t.A.T.u. songs], but it's so stupid—absolutely stupid. If you pursue a solo career, it means that you do your own work. Her stuff, that she makes, I think, is silly and very soon her career will wither away and disappear." Katina responded to this interview via her YouTube Page, "I saw Julia's interview. Of course I got upset. But I want to tell everybody that I have a completely opposite attitude towards the whole situation, Julia's project included. I believe she's a very talented person and I sincerely hope that she'll be successful in all the things she plans."

In July, Katina made an appearance on a radio station where she was asked about the future of the duo. She responded by saying, "Life has changed a lot. Julia and I are working on our projects now. I, for one, will be traveling to Los Angeles this Saturday, where I will keep working on my album. And I'm preparing a big show in San Francisco in September, so now we are not planning to reform t.A.T.u., certainly not in the near future. Now we really want to concentrate only on our own projects." Lena Katina and her full band performed her first live major solo show in San Francisco on 17 September 2010.

=== 2011: Disbandment ===
At the end of March 2011, t.A.T.u. management released a press release on their official website declaring t.A.T.u. over. Due to conflicts between the two women, and them both wanting to pursue solo careers, the duo was officially announced as disbanded, after a two-year hiatus. They finalised the duo's discography with a double remix album for Waste Management. The management thanked fans for their loyalty over the prior twelve years of the duo's history.

After the split, the group decided to focus on their solo careers, both musically and in film. In August 2011, Katina revealed her debut solo single "Never Forget" which eventually charted at number one on the US Hot Dance Club Songs for a single week. Volkova was also working on her studio album and released two singles; "All Because of You" and "Didn't Wanna Do It", but failed to generate interest on the music charts. The following year she confirmed she would be starring in the dark comedy zombie film Zombie Holidays 3D.

=== 2012–2021: Aftermath with Volkova and Katina arguments ===
On 2 October 2012, Cherrytree Records/Universal Russia announced that they would be issuing a special re-release of t.A.T.u.'s 200 km/h in the Wrong Lane. The "10th Year Anniversary Edition" featured all new artwork, a never-before-released song from the 2002 sessions, "A Simple Motion", a brand new remix of "All the Things She Said" from producer Fernando Garibay, in addition to newly mastered songs. On 24 October 2012, Cherrytree Records released the official track listing for the album; it was a note addressed to fans handwritten and signed by Katina and Volkova themselves. The album was released on 12 November 2012. On 11 December 2012, the duo reunited as musical guests on The Voice of Romania, where they performed "All the Things She Said" and "All About Us". It was their first performance together in three years.

After the re-release, the group were interviewed by Bradley Stern on MuuMuse, and was asked about a reunion and relationship together. Volkova stated "We don't keep in touch", while Katina stated "Only when we see each other. We have very different lives in different countries now. We are not in a fight though." As for a reunion, Katina said "I believe that there is always a chance for anything in this life. Maybe…." Volkova stated that, while she is not "ready for it", she said "But this won't stop us from reuniting for joint performances. We’ll see what happens!"

On 25 April 2013, the group performed one private live show in Moscow. It was their first concert as a duo since 2008. Despite media reports suggesting a permanent reunion of t.A.T.u., both members later clarified that there are no plans for a full-scale comeback. Volkova told an interviewer that they were not reuniting after all. Katina also stated that her solo career was the number one goal at that time and if t.A.T.u. was going to reunite, it would only be for small things like commercials and concerts.

On 27 September 2013, t.A.T.u. performed a concert in Kyiv, Ukraine. Shortly thereafter they wore their schoolgirls outfits from their first album again for a Snickers Japanese advertisement. Whilst in Japan they also performed "All the Things She Said" live in Tokyo. They also briefly reunited for a series of short concerts and television appearances in Russia between October and December 2013.

The duo performed before the opening ceremony of the 2014 Winter Olympics Opening Ceremony in Sochi, along with piano virtuoso Denis Matsuev and opera soprano Anna Netrebko, who also performed the Olympic anthem. Media reports expressed confusion at this performance, given that there is a lack of LGBT rights in Russia, especially since the much politicized Russian law banning gay propaganda aimed at minors that is being used to promote family values. The ceremony's director, Konstantin Ernst, said t.A.T.u.'s "Not Gonna Get Us" was chosen because it's one of the few Russian pop songs that international viewers might recognize.

Shortly after performing at the Olympics, the group announced a new single, "Lyubov v Kazhdom Mgnovenii" ("Love in Every Moment"). The song features Russian rapper Ligalize and Canadian musician Mike Tompkins.

On 17 February 2014, Katina posted a video message on her official YouTube channel stating that she would no longer be working with Volkova and that t.A.T.u. was once again no longer a group. However, on 20 February, Volkova posted a video message saying that there is "no big reunion" but t.A.T.u. were having "joint projects". She also criticized Katina's "meaning" behind the video and confirmed that they would be shooting the video for the new single. On 5 March 2014, Volkova posted another video message on her official YouTube channel in response to Katina's video. She stated that despite "reasons of severe trepidation on the part of Lena about [Volkova] and [her] behavior," collaboration between the two was possible, referring to the release of their new single as well as their music video.

On 6 April 2014, the music video to "Love in Every Moment" was released to the Cornetto Ru page on YouTube, in which Katina and Volkova filmed their scenes apart. Towards the end of the video, Volkova is shown interacting with a body double of Katina, with the latter's face obscured. The song is part of the "A Sight of Cupid" project which contains several short films about love. In the short film "Together Apart" the duo were portrayed as cupids. On 22 May 2014, both singers introduced the film at the 67th Cannes Film Festival. Due to their conflict and in keeping with Katina's wishes to not interact with Volkova, both singers had separate interviews with reporters. Volkova announced during an interview with the Italian press that the film would be the last collaborative work between her and Katina. Despite tensions, a petition dubbed "#tATuComeback" was circulated throughout popular social media websites, such as Facebook and Twitter, in the hopes that the former duo would resolve their conflicts and return with their long-awaited comeback as they had originally planned.

On 19 May 2016, the duo met publicly again at the 25th anniversary celebration of the children's musical group Neposedy, which both were a part of before the formation of t.A.T.u. There, together with the children, Katina and Volkova unexpectedly performed "Nas Ne Dogonyat" ("Not Gonna Get Us"). However, the artists appeared distant and detached on stage, keeping a clear physical and emotional distance and largely avoiding any interaction with each other throughout the event.

On 8 June 2021, a lengthy interview and documentary about t.A.T.u.'s story titled "ТАТУ: 20 лет спустя! Главная российская группа в мире" was published on YouTube on journalist Ksenia Sobchak's channel. The documentary discussed the formation of the group, its past controversies and Katina's and Volkova's personal and career developments after t.A.T.u. It also included interviews of former t.A.T.u. producer Ivan Shapovalov and Lena Katina's mother. Katina and Volkova were interviewed separately, as Katina rejected a common interview. The interview/documentary was the most trending video on Russian YouTube the day after it was published.

=== 2022–present: Return to the stage ===
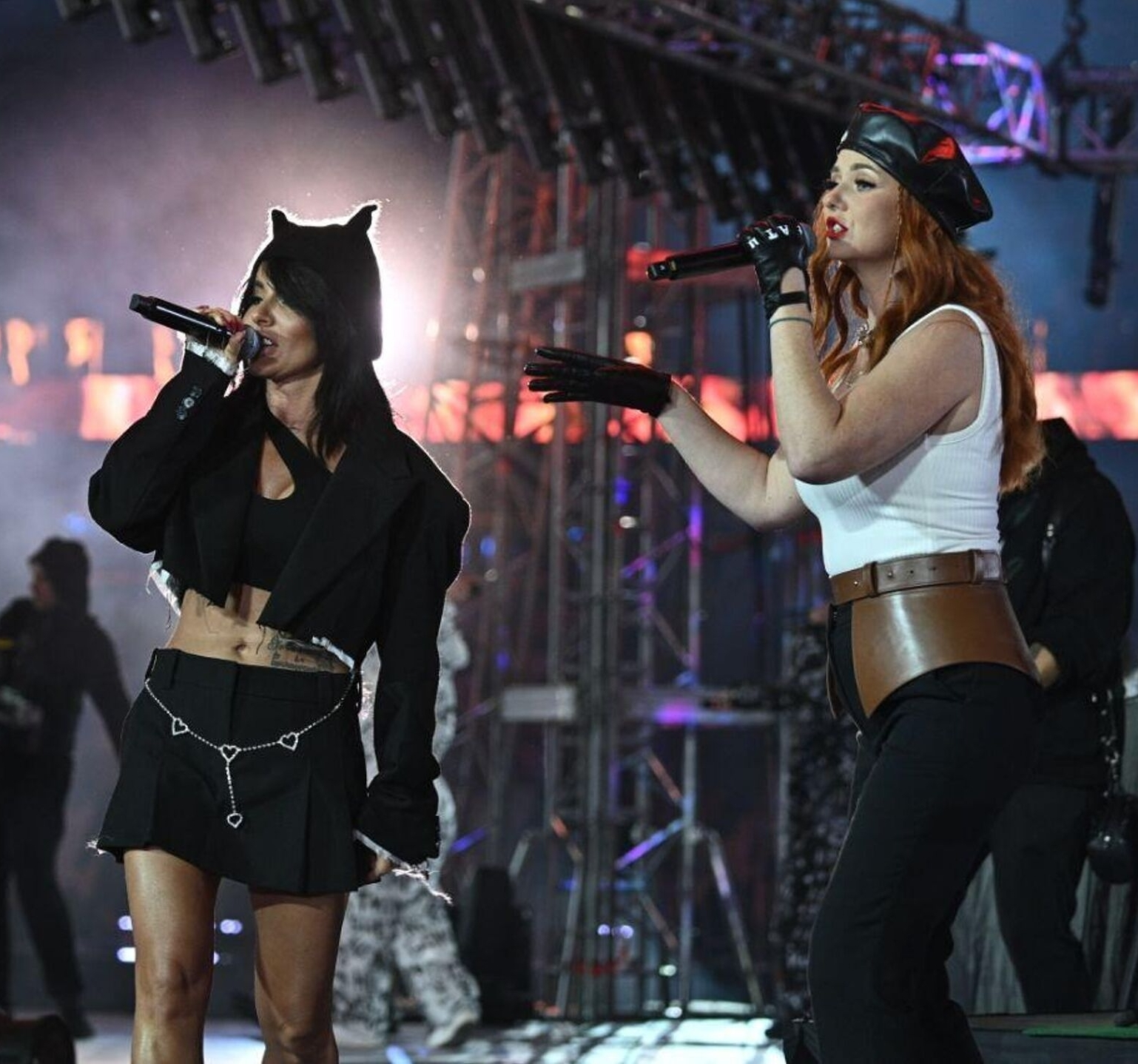
t.A.T.u. performing in Minsk, September 2022

In late 2021, Katina and Volkova announced that t.A.T.u. would return to the stage in 2022 to take part in the official duo tribute concert. However, persistent issues with the ongoing COVID-19 pandemic led to its cancellation. The duo eventually reunited on stage for the first time since their falling out in September 2022, performing at the Dinamo Stadium in Minsk as part of the Ovion Show event. This was followed by another performance at a sporting event at the Gazprom Stadium in Saint Petersburg in May 2023.

t.A.T.u. reunited again in July 2025 to perform at the Mriya Resort in Yalta, Crimea. Katina has stated that she and Volkova had resolved their conflict and that plans for the group's future are underway. Shortly after, Interscope Records released a special deluxe edition of the album Dangerous and Moving to commemorate the twentieth anniversary of its publication, featuring 24 tracks (including several in Russian). This was followed by a reunion tour across Russia, Europe and Latin America between 2025 and 2026, including nine dates in Mexico.

In September 2025, t.A.T.u. were announced as brand ambassadors for Gosha Rubchinskiy, appearing in a new advertising campaign for the designer. On October 24, 2025, the album compilation V Podnebesnoy was released, a collection of songs recorded in 2004 with former producer Ivan Shapovalov but never officially released, although some tracks had previously leaked online individually and others had been re-recorded and included on their second Russian-language studio album Lyudi Invalidy. Katina and Volkova stated that they had nothing to do with the release, and it was noted in the Russian media that the rights to the tracks on the album are owned by Shapovalov.

== Artistry and controversies ==
=== Public image ===
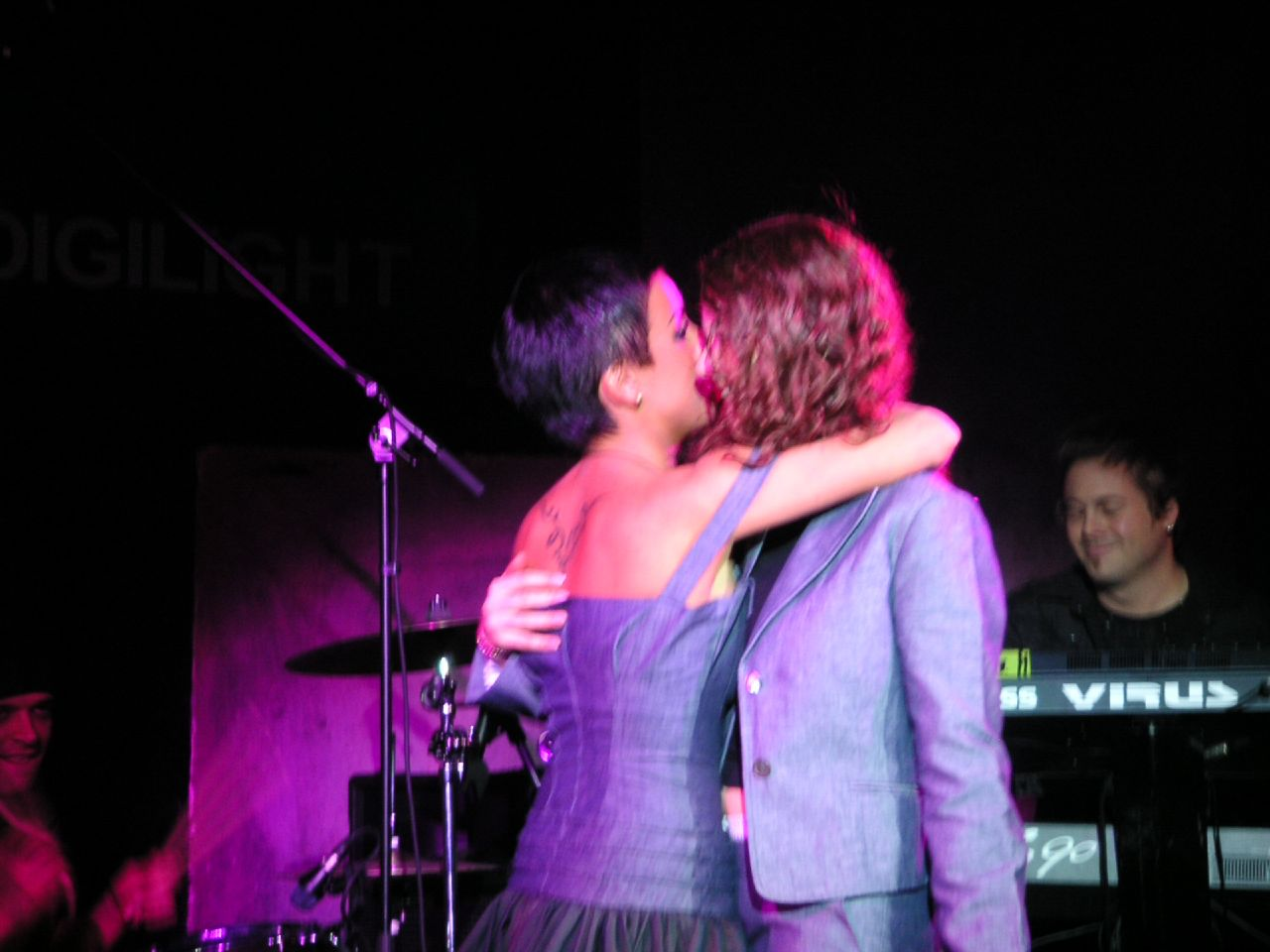
t.A.T.u. kissing during a concert in Moscow, October 2005

Throughout their career, the group received criticism, particularly after the release of "All the Things She Said". In his AllMusic review of 200 km/h in the Wrong Lane, Stephen Thomas Erlewine labelled the band as an "exceptionally tawdry gimmick". In 2003, after the release of their video of "All the Things She Said", some UK presenters campaigned to ban the video worldwide. Despite subsequent reports that the BBC had banned the video from their pre-watershed programme Top of the Pops, the BBC quickly denied the ban, stating only that they had better footage to show.

In 2004, it was announced that Volkova was pregnant. This led to critics accusing the girls of being "fake" lesbians, although Katina and Volkova had said in the past they were not "together" or "in a relationship". On 17 May 2007, t.A.T.u. issued a statement directed to their gay fans: "When t.A.T.u.'s second album came out, many of our fans of alternative sexual orientation thought that we lied and betrayed them. This is not true! We've never done that and we've always advocated love without boundaries." On 26 May, they flew out to Moscow to take part in the Moscow Gay Pride demonstration.

The group have appeared on Forbes's Top 50 Richest Stars of Russia twice, ranking sixth in 2006, with an estimated income of $3.3 million, and thirty-sixth in 2007, with an income of $1.4 million. The group received the FHM Special Award for being the Top 100 Sexiest Woman. Both Katina and Volkova have been ranked on Maxim Russia's Top 100 Sexiest Girls, with Katina at fifty-three and Volkova at fifteen. The group also appeared on the cover of Maxim.

=== Cancellations of concerts controversy ===
Between the years of 2002 and 2003, t.A.T.u. caused controversy for cancelling several concerts and tours around the world. In March 2003, the group announced dates for their "Show Me Love Promo Tour" in the United Kingdom. However the next month, just days before they were due to perform, the group dropped the dates and did not perform at the concert, due to poor ticket sales. BBC News stated that only a fraction of the tickets were sold for the concert and said the stadiums (in London and Manchester) had capacities of around 10,000. A spokesman from their label, Interscope, did not understand why the cancellation took place.

In May 2003, t.A.T.u.'s management were sued by the promoters EEM Group for the cancellations of the concerts. EEM sued their management for £300,000, claiming they put "unachievable and numerous obstacles" in the way of ticket sales for the shows. They also claimed that Volkova's illness was a reason for the cancellation; however, due to the lack of evidence, the lawsuit was discarded. After the lawsuit, the group also cancelled their Asian promo tour for Japan and China, due to Volkova's sickness, stating that she needed urgent surgery. The same month, the group postponed their German Promo tour, due to a late invitation to the 2003 MTV Movie Awards, where they performed.

In June, they also cancelled their Riga concert, which led to a lawsuit from Pasadena Group Promotion, asking for $180,000 in damages. At the end of June 2003, t.A.T.u. embarked on a promotional tour in Japan involving a film shoot of a promotional video, an appearance on the Japanese music program Music Station, and a concert. However, they abruptly left Music Station while the show was in mid-broadcast and cancelled their concert on the following day. Their appearance on Music Station led the show's broadcasting station, TV Asahi, to sue Universal Music KK, their Japanese label, and ban future appearances on the show. Katina and Volkova later stated that the majority of the cancellations around this period of time were orchestrated by Shapovalov, who had wanted to use "negative press" in order to draw in more media attention. Both cited this as one of the reasons why they decided to fire him as their manager.

While promoting their studio album Dangerous and Moving, the group cancelled their appearances in Chile due to poor ticket sales and the withdrawal of one of the Chilean sponsors. One month later, the group cancelled their tour at the last minute, due to inadequate stage preparation and poor ticket sales.

==== Music Station incident ====
On 27 June 2003, t.A.T.u. made their first appearance on Japanese television through the live music program Music Station as part of their promotional tour, but they abruptly left the show mid-air after the opening credits, following a phone call from Shapovalov to the girls informing them his refusal to allow their performance. On 28 June 2003, Shapovalov and t.A.T.u. held a press conference, where the former had reportedly felt that the outfits that TV Asahi, the broadcasting station of Music Station, had provided for t.A.T.u were too revealing, and he was concerned for their privacy. In addition, he was concerned about the "lack of communication" about the show's format. Shapovalov and t.A.T.u. stated that they had believed that the duo would be the only performer on the episode and felt uncomfortable sharing their air time with other Japanese artists.

Universal Music KK, t.A.T.u.'s Japanese label, issued an apology; Shapovalov and t.A.T.u., on the other hand, refused to apologize. t.A.T.u. also cancelled a concert in Japan in the same month. Japanese media heavily criticized t.A.T.u. over their behavior on Music Station and the press conference, which they perceived as disrespectful. TV Asahi, in particular, had reportedly been already unhappy after t.A.T.u. had previously cancelled their appearance on Music Station earlier in April 2003 despite that commercials promoting them as guest performers had already been broadcast. They lodged a complaint against Universal Music KK, threatening to ban any artist associated with the label from appearing on the show. They later launched a lawsuit against Universal Music KK in July 2003 for damages and banned t.A.T.u. from future appearances on Music Station. Japanese comedian Tamori, the host of Music Station, stated in 2021 that out of the 34 years he had hosted the show, t.A.T.u.'s refusal to perform was the most memorable to him.

When t.A.T.u. returned to Japan in December 2003 for a two-day concert in Tokyo Dome, only 25,059 attended on the opening night in a venue with a capacity for 50,000 people. In 2006, t.A.T.u. released "Gomenasai" as an apology, but it failed to gain traction in Japan. In 2013, through an interview with The Asahi Shimbun, Katina and Volkova stated that Shapovalov had ordered them to leave Music Station to create "controversy" in hopes of them getting more media attention, and, as they were young, they did not fully understand his actions at the time. While their last-minute cancellations successfully led to more positive media attention in Russia and Europe, it failed in Japan due to cultural differences, in that Japan valued punctuality and fulfillment of obligations. Katina and Volkova stated that they regretted the incident and apologized. Following the interview, public opinion of t.A.T.u. began to improve in Japan, and they appeared in a Snickers commercial in the same year.

== Legacy ==
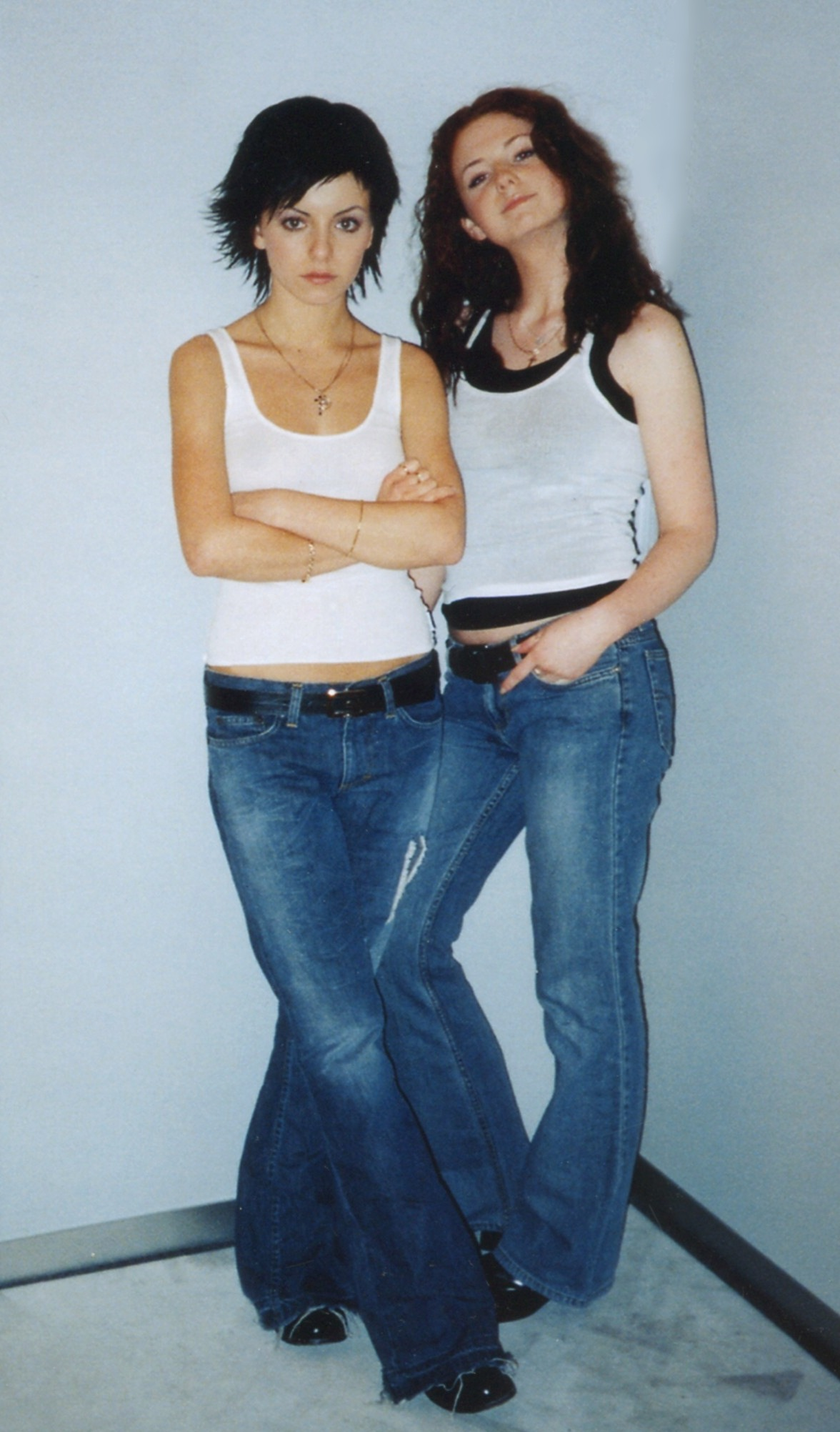
t.A.T.u. in 2003

With over 10 million records sold worldwide, t.A.T.u. is regarded as the most commercially successful Russian pop duo in history, despite some controversies. "All the Things She Said" was ranked at number 452 in Blender magazine's "The 500 Greatest Songs Since You Were Born". The song was listed at number 8 on the AOL's Top 100 Pop Songs of the Decade. Rebecca Bary from The New Zealand Herald listed the song at number five on their Top Ten Best Singles of 2003. Bill Lamb from About.com listed the song on his Top 100 Pop Songs of 2003 at number 31 and on his Top 10 Contemporary Girl Group Songs at number ten.

In 2008, the group received the MTV Legend award by MTV Russia. The group is the most successful Russian musical export of all time. Katina stated to Billboard Magazine; "People will remember us for great songs, being free, taking life as it is and not being afraid of anything, [There were] provocative images of two girls kissing each other, but the second thing was the really great music." In 2006, both women were awarded "Woman of the Year" by GQ's Person of the Year Awards, but were not awarded under the band name.

Following its use in the Canadian TV series Heated Rivalry in late 2025, "All the Things She Said" triggered a massive viral resurgence that pushed the track past 700 million Spotify streams, fueled by a 135% surge in U.S. listenership and a 200% influx of new fans—60% of whom are Gen Z—effectively returning both the original and Harrison’s cover version to the global charts.

== Productions and T.A. Music ==
When t.A.T.u. was first formed by Shapovalov, Neformat was created as the group's production company, with Shapovalov and Renski at the head. In 2004, the company was dissolved when t.A.T.u. left Shapovalov.

Since 2005, T.A. Music has been the Moscow-based production company of t.A.T.u. The liner notes that accompanied the release of Dangerous and Moving said that the company was composed of t.A.T.u., Boris Renski, Dasha Mischenko, and Andrey Artischev. After t.A.T.u. broke ties with Universal Music in 2006, it was announced in 2008 that T.A. Music would become the duo's record label, although only currently in the Russian market. Vesyolye Ulybki was released internationally on iTunes through the T.A. Music label. T.A. Music also acted for some time as the label and management company for Lena Katina's solo project.

== Members ==
- Lena Katina – vocals (1999–2011, 2025–present)
- Julia Volkova – vocals (1999–2011, 2025–present)

Backing band members

- Sven Martin – keyboards, synthesizer, programming, piano, backing vocals, musical director (2002–2011)
- Troy MacCubbin – guitars, backing vocals (2002–2010)
- Matthew Venslauskas – guitars (2010–2011)
- Roman Ratej – drums (2003–2006)
- Steve "Boomstick" Wilson – drums (2006–2011)
- Domen Vajevec – bass, keyboard (2006–2011)

== Discography ==
- 200 Po Vstrechnoy (2001)
- 200 km/h in the Wrong Lane (2002)
- Dangerous and Moving (2005)
- Lyudi Invalidy (2005)
- Vesyolye Ulybki (2008)
- Waste Management (2009)

== Filmography ==
| Year | Title | Role | Notes |
|---|---|---|---|
| 2003 | Anatomy of t.A.T.u. | Themselves | TV documentary |
| 2004 | t.A.T.u. v Podnebesnoy | Themselves | TV series |
| 2006 | t.A.T.u. Expedition | Themselves | TV series |
| 2008 | You and I | Themselves | Cameo |

== Tours ==
- 200 Po Vstrechnoy Tour (2001–2002)
- Show Me Love Tour (2003)
- Dangerous and Moving Tour (2005–2006)
- Reunion World Tour (2025–2027)

2025
| Date | City | Country | Venue | Notes |
|---|---|---|---|---|
| July 19 | Yalta | Crimea (Note: Crimea is a peninsula that is administered by Russia since 2014 after having been belonged to Ukraine.) | Mriya Resort | First official date |
| October 24 | Moscow | Russia | TAU | |
| October 25 | Moscow | Russia | TAU | |
| November 20 | Tokyo | Japan | Laforet Harajuku | Private event |
| November 28 | Moscow | Russia | DEX | As part of New Year's Fest 2026 |
| December 1 | Mexico City | Mexico | La Maraka | |
| December 2 | Mexico City | Mexico | La Maraka | |
| December 3 | Mexico City | Mexico | La Maraka | |
| December 4 | Mexico City | Mexico | La Maraka | |
| December 5 | Monterrey | Mexico | Foro Urbano | |
| December 6 | Guadalajara | Mexico | Teatro Estudio Cavaret | |
2026
| Date | City | Country | Venue | Notes |
| January 4 | Saint Petersburg | Russia | Sound | |
| January 5 | Moscow | Russia | Atmosphere | |
| January 30 | Tbilisi | Georgia | Old Sport Palace | Rescheduled |
| February 26 | Ufa | Russia | Ogni Ufy | |
| February 27 | Kazan | Russia | Korston | |
| March 1 | Yekaterinburg | Russia | Yekaterinburg-Expo | |
| May 7 | Mexico City | Mexico | La Maraka | |
| May 8 | Mexico City | Mexico | La Maraka | |
| May 10 | Mérida | Mexico | Auditorio Coca-Cola La Isla | |
| May 16 | São Paulo | Brazil | Komplexo Tempo | |
| May 24 | Moscow | Russia | Luzhniki Stadium | As part of 2025–26 Russian Cup |
| May 29 | Krasnodar | Russia | Port 219 | |
| May 30 | Rostov-on-Don | Russia | Embargo | |
| June 7 | Nizhny Novgorod | Russia | Trade Union Sport Palace | Rescheduled |
| June 14 | Saint Petersburg | Russia | Roof Place | |
| July 5 | Saint Petersburg | Russia | Park 300 Years of Saint Petersburg | As part of VK Fest |
| July 11 | Nizhny Novgorod | Russia | Spit of Nizhny Novgorod | As part of VK Fest |
| July 19 | Moscow | Russia | VDNKh | As part of VK Fest |
| July 29 | Forte dei Marmi | Italy | Versiliana Festival | |
| August 1 | Batumi | Georgia | Batumi Tennis Courts | Cancelled |
| August 23 | Limassol | Cyprus | | Private event |
| August 27 | Nizhny Novgorod | Russia | MTS Live Hall | Cancelled |
| September 4 | Moscow | Russia | Atmosphere | |
| November 11 | Minsk | Belarus | Minsk Sports Palace | |
| November 13 | Irkutsk | Russia | LD «Aisberg» | |
| November 14 | Novosibirsk | Russia | LDS «Sibir» | |
2027
| Date | City | Country | Venue | Notes |
| January 4 | Moscow | Russia | VK Stadium | |
| January 7 | Saint Petersburg | Russia | Club A2 | |
| March 5 | Chelyabinsk | Russia | DC Yunost | |
| April 4 | Yekaterinburg | Russia | MTS Live Hall | |

== See also ==
- Russian pop music
- List of all-female bands

== Notes ==
Awards and achievements
| Preceded by Prime Minister with "Northern Girl" | Russia in the Eurovision Song Contest; 2003 | Succeeded by Julia Savicheva with "Believe Me" |
