= All About Us (t.A.T.u. song) =

2005 single by t.A.T.u.

Single by t.A.T.u.

from the album Dangerous and Moving
- B-side: "Divine"
- Released: 1 September 2005
- Genre: Pop rock; Europop
- Length: 3:02
- Label: Interscope
- Songwriters: Josh Alexander; Billy Steinberg; Jessica Origliasso; Lisa Origliasso
- Producers: Martin Kierszenbaum; Robert Orton

t.A.T.u. singles chronology
"How Soon Is Now?" (2003)	"All About Us" (2005)	"Lyudi Invalidy" (2005)

Music video
- "All About Us" on YouTube

"All About Us" is a song recorded by Russian musical duo t.A.T.u. for their second English language studio album, Dangerous and Moving (2005). It was also featured on the group's second Russian studio album Lyudi Invalidy. The song was written by Josh Alexander, Billy Steinberg, and twin sisters Jessica and Lisa Origliasso of the Veronicas, and was produced by Martin Kierszenbaum and Robert Orton. "All About Us" was released through Interscope in September 2005, as the album's lead single.

The song was greeted with positive reviews from music critics, who many praised the ambition and was specified as a highlight on the album. Commercially, it performed very well on the charts, charting in many European charts and managed to have success in North America and Oceania. An accompanying music video was issued for the single, which featured the group running away from each other. The video was considered controversial by critics and fans, featuring disturbing content.

== Reception ==
=== Critical response ===
"All About Us" received generally positive reviews from most music critics. Roger Holland from Popmatters said "it's 'All The Things She Said - Part Dva (two)'. [...] It packs more amateur operatics, more rock and more intelligent pop into a little under three minutes than Queen could shoehorn into the entirety of 'Bohemian Rhapsody'." The Pitt News compared it "in vein" to the group's previous singles "All The Things She Said" and "Not Gonna Get Us" saying "The song tries to silence the media hype and rumors concerning their sexuality, relationships, disputes and drug use that followed the girls after their emergence, letting the world know that they are still together and as strong as ever." Michael Freedburg from The Boston Phoenix said along with "Friend or Foe", "Perfect Enemy" and "Dangerous and Moving", it "shoots straight to the gut — and to the heart." Betty Clarke from The Guardian said that the song "is good, glossy pop, any empathy lurking in these tales of teenage persecution is lost in translation."

Dom Passantino from Stylus Magazine said that the song "runs along on animalistic lust, high-off-your-own-supply paranoia, mental anguish, and the ever-present threat of sudden, bloody violence." Stephen Thomas Erlewine from Allmusic said the song sounded similar to "Not Gonna Get Us".

=== Commercial performance ===
"All About Us" experienced chart success all around the world. In Oceania, the song only managed to peak inside the top forty, peaking at thirty-nine on the Australian Singles Chart. It was very successful in European markets, peaking inside the top ten in most countries including Austria, France, Sweden, Switzerland, the United Kingdom and Wallonia. The song became the group's last charting single in the United States, peaking at number 13 on the US Dance Club Play.

== Music video ==
The shooting of the music video took place in Los Angeles, produced by film director James Cox. There are two versions of the video, one censored and the other uncut (also known as the explicit version). The censored video was released on the official website on 18 August. The uncut version was released later. The video was popular in Europe and was retired on Poland's TRL after spending 50 days on the countdown. The video had much airplay on American television, but was actually played more on Spanish-speaking networks than others.

A shot from the "All About Us" video

=== Synopsis ===
The uncensored version of the music video starts off with Lena and Julia pulling up in a car, with the chorus to "All the Things She Said" playing on the radio. They enter a Korean restaurant as fake headlines are shown on the screen – rumors of their relationship. They sit at a table, take shots and begin arguing with each other, and Julia storms off. The headlines continue as Julia walks down the side of the restaurant, and Lena drives off after her. While walking down the road, Julia gets picked up by a man (played by actor Charlie Koznik). Lena attempts to call Julia on a cell phone, but it seems she is already on her phone with another person. Julia and the man eventually go to his home, where they start to have sex. However, it quickly turns into attempted rape, when the man begins to force himself on Julia.

She shoves him off of her, flips the man off and calls Lena. However, he then physically assaults Julia, first punching her in the back of her head before pushing her through the glass top of a coffee table. Her phone is dropped, and Lena drives off in search of her. The man attempts to strangle Julia, but she is able to break free, and gain enough time to locate bullets and a gun in a case. When he turns around to attack her again, Julia shoots him in the mouth at point-blank range, splattering his brains on the wall. She then climbs out a window and down the fire escape, just in time to meet up with Lena, who drives up to her in a getaway car, and the two smile at each other.

=== Censored edits ===
The censored version of the music video was heavily edited for viewing on television. Omitted are Julia giving the finger to the man, her being thrown into the glass, the finding of the gun, the blood spatter and Julia kicking her assailant's body. Vevo censors out the flipping scene and replaces it with Julia giving the man the fist.

== Track listings ==
Japanese CD single

1. "All About Us"
2. "All About Us" (instrumental version)

UK CD single

1. "All About Us" (single version) – 3:05
2. "All the Things She Said" (album version) – 3:34

UK maxi-CD single

1. "All About Us" (single version) – 3:05
2. "Divine" (non-LP long version) – 3:17
3. "All About Us" (Dave Audé Vocal Edit) – 4:36
4. "All About Us" (Stephane K Radio Mix) – 4:09
- "All About Us" (Explicit Music Video) – 3:26

Europe maxi-CD single

1. "All About Us" (single version) – 3:05
2. "Divine" (non-LP long version) – 3:17
3. "All About Us" (Dave Audé Vocal Edit) – 4:36
4. "All About Us" (Stephane K Radio Mix) – 4:09
- "All About Us" (Explicit Music Video) – 3:26

The Remixes CD single

1. "All About Us" (Dave Audé Big Room Vocal)
2. "All About Us" (Dave Audé Vocal Edit)
3. "All About Us" (Dave Audé Big Club Dub)
4. "All About Us" (Dave Audé Big Mixshow)
5. "All About Us" (Dave's Acid Funk Dub)
6. "All About Us" (Stephane K Radio Mix)
7. "All About Us" (Stephane K Extended Mix)
8. "All About Us" (Stephane K Guitar Dub Mix)
9. "All About Us" (The Lovermakers Mix)
10. "All About Us" (Glam As You Mix by Guena LG)
11. "All About Us" (Glam As You Radio Mix by Guena LG)
12. "All About Us" (Sunset in Ibiza Mix by Guena LG)
13. "All About Us" (Sunset in Ibiza Radio Mix by Guena LG)

== Charts ==
=== Weekly charts ===
Weekly chart performance for "All About Us"
Chart (2005–2006)	Peak position
Australia (ARIA)	39
Austria (Ö3 Austria Top 40)	3
Belgium (Ultratop 50 Flanders)	11
Belgium (Ultratop 50 Wallonia)	4
CIS Airplay (TopHit)	5
Czech Republic Airplay (ČNS IFPI)	6
Europe (Eurochart Hot 100)	11
Finland (Suomen virallinen lista)	4
France (SNEP)	7
Germany (GfK)	7
Greece (IFPI Greece)	9
Hungary (Rádiós Top 40)	8
Hungary (Dance Top 40)	6
Ireland (IRMA)	20
Italy (FIMI)	4
Japan (Oricon)	27
Netherlands (Single Top 100)	39
Norway (VG-lista)	10
Romania (Romanian Top 100)	8
Russia Airplay (TopHit)	7
Scottish Singles Sales (Official Charts)	7
Sweden (Sverigetopplistan)	6
Switzerland (Schweizer Hitparade)	9
Ukraine Airplay (TopHit)	5
UK Singles (Official Charts)	8
US Dance Club Songs (Billboard)	13

=== Year-end charts ===
2005 year-end chart performance for "All About Us"
Chart (2005)	Position
Austria (Ö3 Austria Top 40)	35
Belgium (Ultratop 50 Flanders)	67
Belgium (Ultratop 50 Wallonia)	38
CIS Airplay (TopHit)	106
Europe (Eurochart Hot 100)	54
France (SNEP)	62
Germany (Media Control GfK)	68
Italy (FIMI)	22
Russia Airplay (TopHit)	109
Sweden (Hitlistan)	44
Switzerland (Schweizer Hitparade)	92
Ukraine Airplay (TopHit)	82
UK Singles (OCC)	167
Venezuela (Record Report)	9

2006 year-end chart performance for "All About Us"
Chart (2006)	Position
CIS Airplay (TopHit)	137
Switzerland (Schweizer Hitparade)	75
Russia Airplay (TopHit)	150
Ukraine Airplay (TopHit)	37

2010 year-end chart performance for "All About Us"
Chart (2010)	Position
Ukraine Airplay (TopHit)	133

2011 year-end chart performance for "All About Us"
Chart (2011)	Position
Ukraine Airplay (TopHit)	153

=== Decade-end charts ===
Decade-end chart performance for "All About Us"
Chart (2000–2009)	Position
Ukraine Airplay (TopHit)	142

== Sales ==
Sales for "All About Us"
Region	Certification	Certified units/sales
France	—	135,079
Italy	—	10,000

== Release history ==
Release dates and formats for "All About Us"
Region	Date	Format(s)	Label(s)	Ref.
Japan	1 September 2005	CD	Interscope	
United Kingdom	26 September 2005	CD	Interscope	
Europe	30 September 2005	CD	Interscope	
Australia	17 October 2005	CD	Interscope	
