= 30 Minutes (song) =

Promotional single by t.A.T.u.

from the album 200 km/h in the Wrong Lane
- Released: June 2003
- Recorded: 2002
- Genre: Pop
- Length: 3:18
- Label: Universal; Interscope
- Songwriters: Sergio Galoyan; Martin Kierszenbaum; Ivan Shapovalov; Valeriy Polienko
- Producers: Martin Kierszenbaum; Robert Orton

Music videos
- "30 Minutes" on YouTube "30 Minut" on YouTube

"30 Minutes" is a song by Russian recording duo t.A.T.u., taken from their debut English language studio album 200 km/h in the Wrong Lane (2002). It was first released in Russian as 30 Minut (Cyrillic: 30 минут, also known as "Полчаса" (Polchasa), meaning half an hour) from the album 200 Po Vstrechnoy (2001). It was written by Sergio Galoyan, Martin Kierszenbaum, Ivan Shapovalov, and Valeriy Polienko, while production was handled by Kierzszenbaum and Robert Orton. The song was released in Europe as a promotional single from the album in 2003.

"30 Minutes" received favorable reviews from music critics, with some critics noting that, compared to other ballads, they felt it was delicate and mellow. It was also noted as a highlight of the studio album. The song managed to chart inside the top forty in Romania. A music video was taken from the Russian version and edited to fit into the English version, which was then released.

== Background and release ==
The song was written by Sergio Galoyan, Martin Kierszenbaum, Ivan Shapovalov, and Valeriy Polienko, while production was handled by Kierzszenbaum and Robert Orton. The song was only served as a promo CD single in Europe, holding three tracks, which consist of the album version, a remix and the music video.

== Reception ==
"30 Minutes" received favorable reviews from most music critics. Drago Bonacich from Allmusic selected the song as an album highlight. James Martin from The Digital Mix called the song an "exceptional haunting piano piece" and concluded that it sounds as chilling as Siberia looks. Matt Cibula from PopMatters described the song as a "slow atmospheric ballad."

Commercially, however, the song was a failure as it didn't manage to chart on any record chart apart from Romania. The song peaked at number thirty-four on the Romanian Singles Chart.

== Music video ==
A video for the Russian version was recorded in 2001 and gained substantial airplay in Russia. The same video was later used for the English version, which was broadcast on 21 March 2003. In the video, Lena is seated on a carousel, kissing and groping a boy. There are close-ups of the boy's hands squeezing Lena's buttocks. Her skirt is removed, and her shirt is lifted, culminating in a scene where Lena's breast is exposed (where a body double was used). Yulia catches Lena kissing him and is seen in a school bathroom, solemnly plotting and unwrapping a crude time bomb. At the end of the video, the lovers, the carousel, and Yulia are blown up.

The interpretation of the video is open-ended. It is implied that Yulia's character was in a relationship with one of the lovers on the carousel, and carries out the murder-suicide as a result of either Lena or the boy being unfaithful, though it could also have been unrequited love for either one. As the lyrics for the English and Russian versions of the song differ in meaning, the video could potentially be interpreted in different ways as a result of these lyrics.

=== Controversy ===
Ivan Shapovalov directed the video in July 2001 and he also directed the band's previous music videos. The video was censored on TV, with the scene of Katina's exposed breast resting on the boy's chest being omitted. The final scene where the carousel explodes because of the bomb is also shortened, adding more parts where Yulia is watching them and making the bomb.

Alternative videos and unused footage depict Katina and Volkova sitting together on a carousel, singing, and showing more graphic sexual content. Katina and her lover undress one another on the carousel; Katina's underwear is removed, and her top is pulled up, exposing her breasts and buttocks. The couple continues to kiss and fondle one another until Volkova finds the pair actually having sex on the carousel before the bomb goes off.

== Track listings ==
Europe Promo CD single

1. "30 Minutes" (Album Version) – 3:16
2. "30 Minutes" (Remix) – 5:54
3. "30 Minutes" (Music Video)

Other remixes

- "30 Minutes" (Dave Audé Extension 119 Club Vocal) – 7:59
- "30 Minut" (HarDrum Remix) – 4:02
- "30 Minut" (Naked Mix Moscow Grooves Institute) – 5:57
- "30 Minut" (Raga Mix By That Black) – 5:15
- "30 Minutes" (Dubstep Remix) – 3:36

=== Samples ===
The song was sampled heavily on 'Dear Anne (Stan Part 2)' by Lil Wayne.

== Charts ==
Chart (2001–2003)	Peak position
Romania (Romanian Top 100)	34
Russia (Music & Media) "30 Minut"	10
