= Robert Orton (engineer) =

British music producer and mix engineer (born 1978)

Robert Orton (born 15 May 1978) is a British music producer and mix engineer. He has worked with many artists including Lady Gaga, Carly Rae Jepsen, Emeli Sandé, Lana Del Rey, Flo Rida, Sean Kingston, Kelis, Ellie Goulding, Owl City, Sean Paul, Enrique Iglesias, Darren Hayes, Robbie Williams, Nicole Scherzinger, Pixie Lott, Lil Jon, Usher, Mary J. Blige, Backstreet Boys, the Police, Pet Shop Boys and t.A.T.u., among others.

He has been nominated for a Grammy Award on several occasions. He has won 4 times, winning two Grammys in 2010 for his work mixing Lady Gaga's debut album The Fame.
