= 1981 =

1981 in various calendars
- Gregorian calendar: 1981; MCMLXXXI
- Ab urbe condita: 2734
- Armenian calendar: 1430; ԹՎ ՌՆԼ
- Assyrian calendar: 6731
- Baháʼí calendar: 137–138
- Balinese saka calendar: 1902–1903
- Bengali calendar: 1387–1388
- Berber calendar: 2931
- British Regnal year: 29 Eliz. 2 – 30 Eliz. 2
- Buddhist calendar: 2525
- Burmese calendar: 1343
- Byzantine calendar: 7489–7490
- Chinese calendar: 庚申年 (Metal Monkey); 4678 or 4471 — to — 辛酉年 (Metal Rooster); 4679 or 4472
- Coptic calendar: 1697–1698
- Discordian calendar: 3147
- Ethiopian calendar: 1973–1974
- Hebrew calendar: 5741–5742
- Hindu calendars
- Vikram Samvat: 2037–2038
- Shaka Samvat: 1902–1903
- Kali Yuga: 5081–5082
- Holocene calendar: 11981
- Igbo calendar: 981–982
- Iranian calendar: 1359–1360
- Islamic calendar: 1401–1402
- Japanese calendar: Shōwa 56 (昭和５６年)
- Javanese calendar: 1913–1914
- Juche calendar: 70
- Julian calendar: Gregorian minus 13 days
- Korean calendar: 4314
- Minguo calendar: ROC 70 民國70年
- Nanakshahi calendar: 513
- Thai solar calendar: 2524
- Tibetan calendar: ལྕགས་ཕོ་སྤྲེ་ལོ་ (male Iron-Monkey); 2107 or 1726 or 954 — to — ལྕགས་མོ་བྱ་ལོ་ (female Iron-Bird); 2108 or 1727 or 955
- Unix time: 347155200 – 378691199

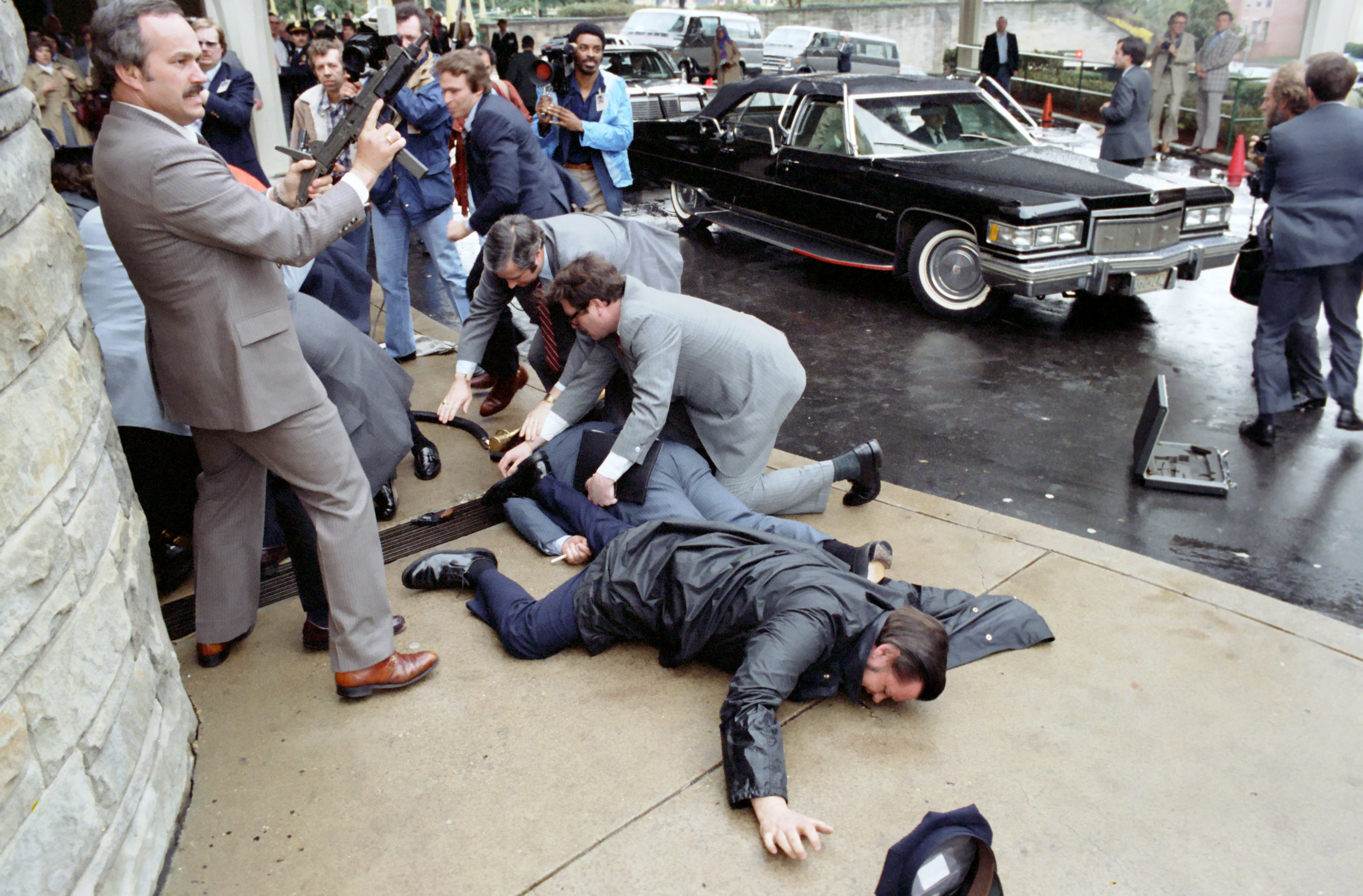
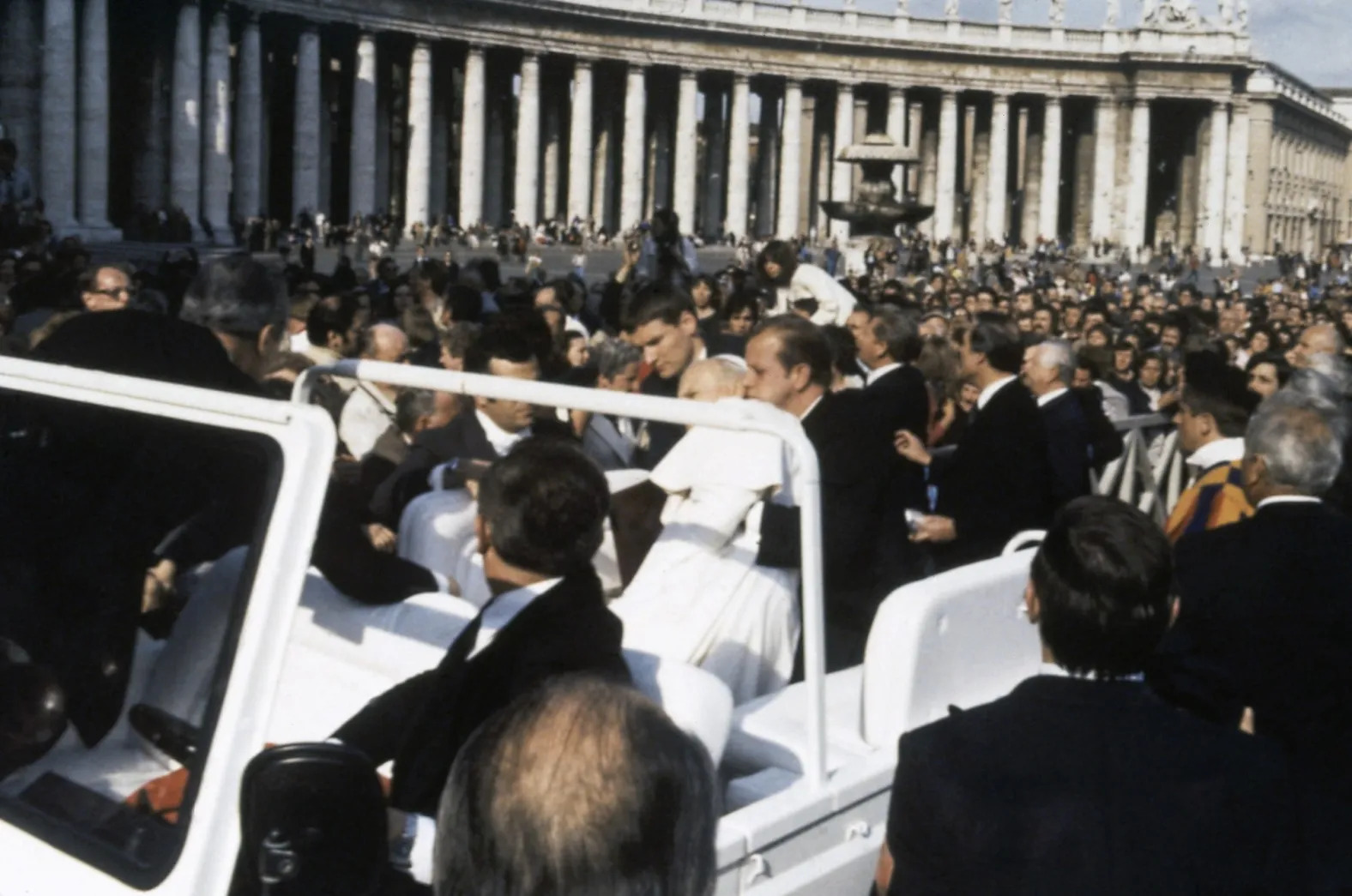
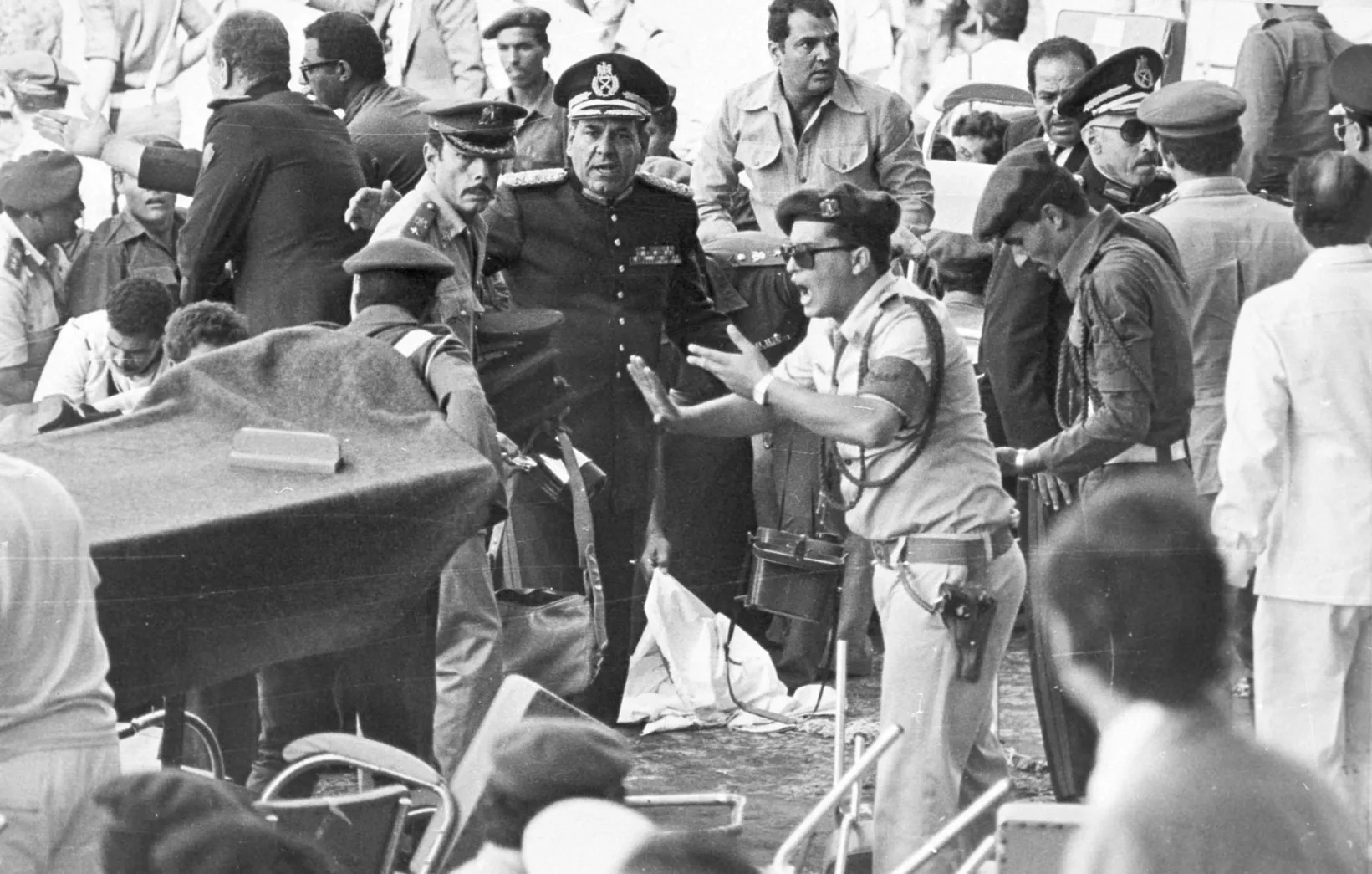
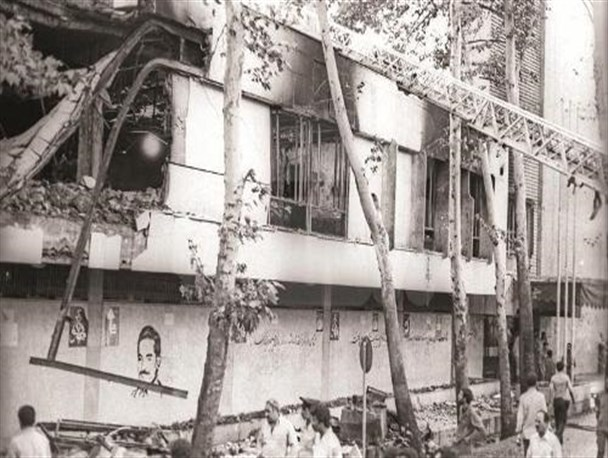
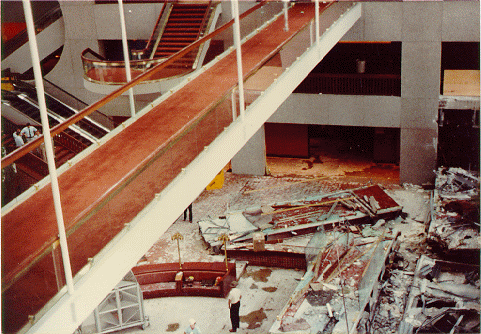
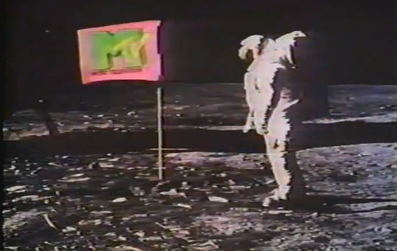
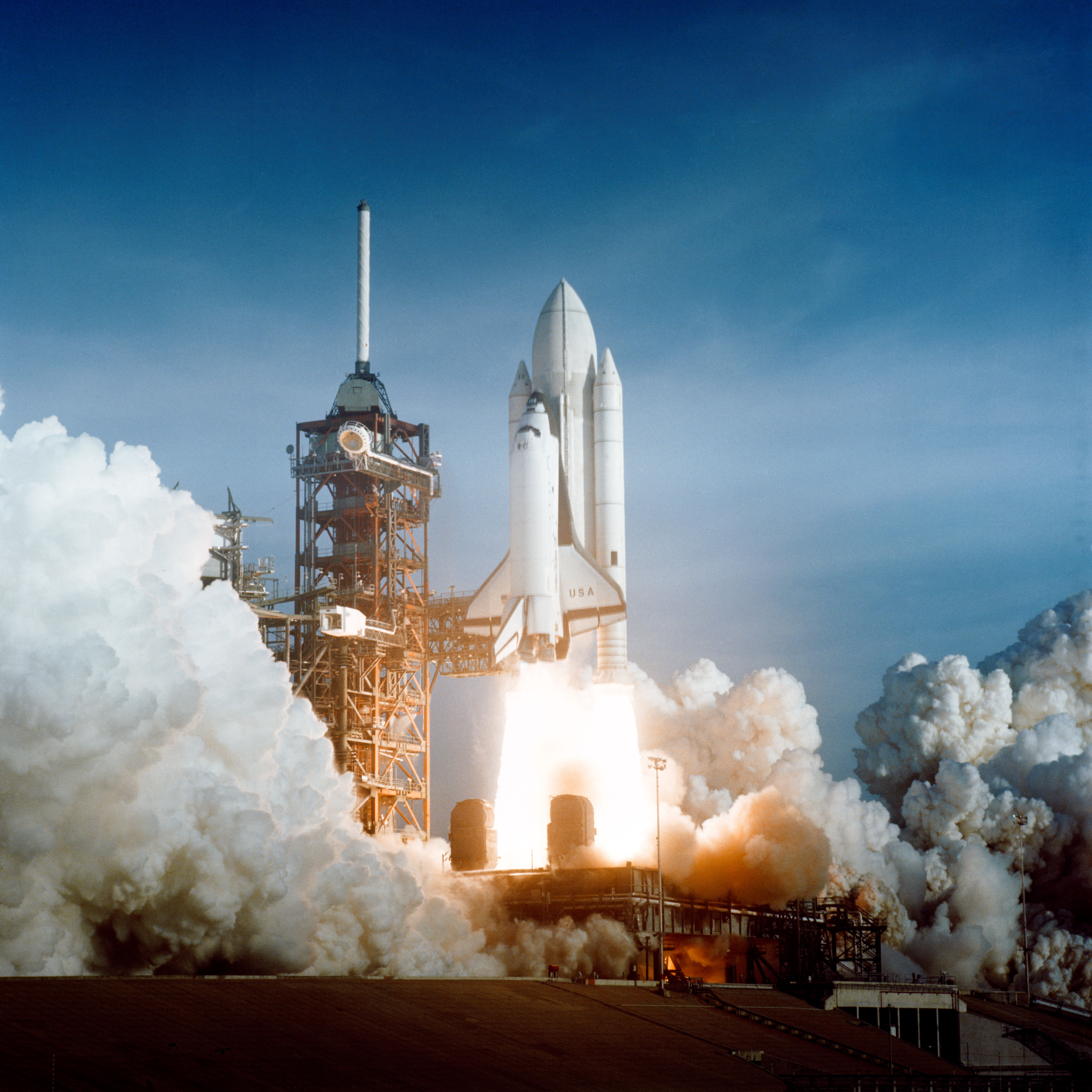
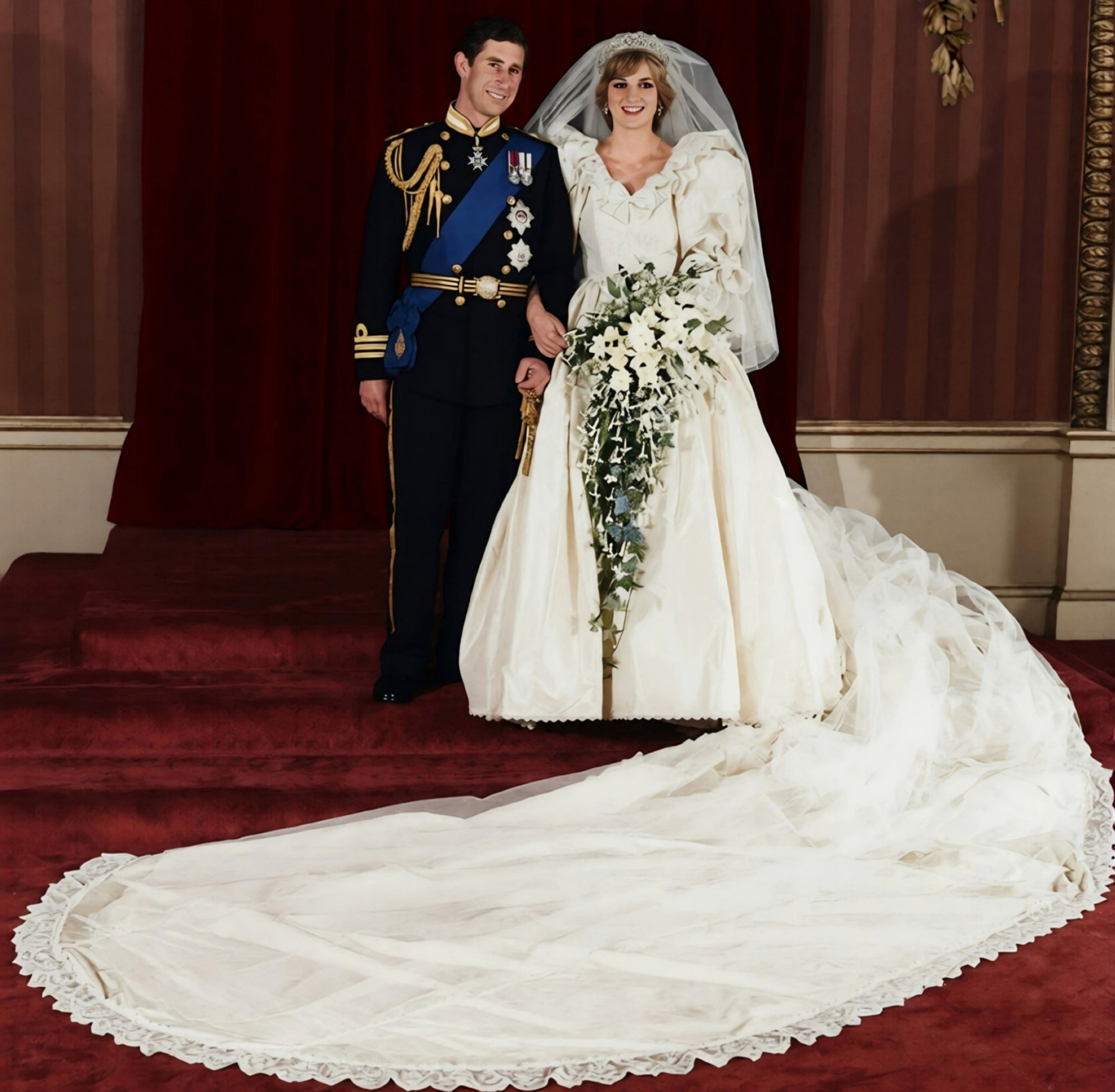
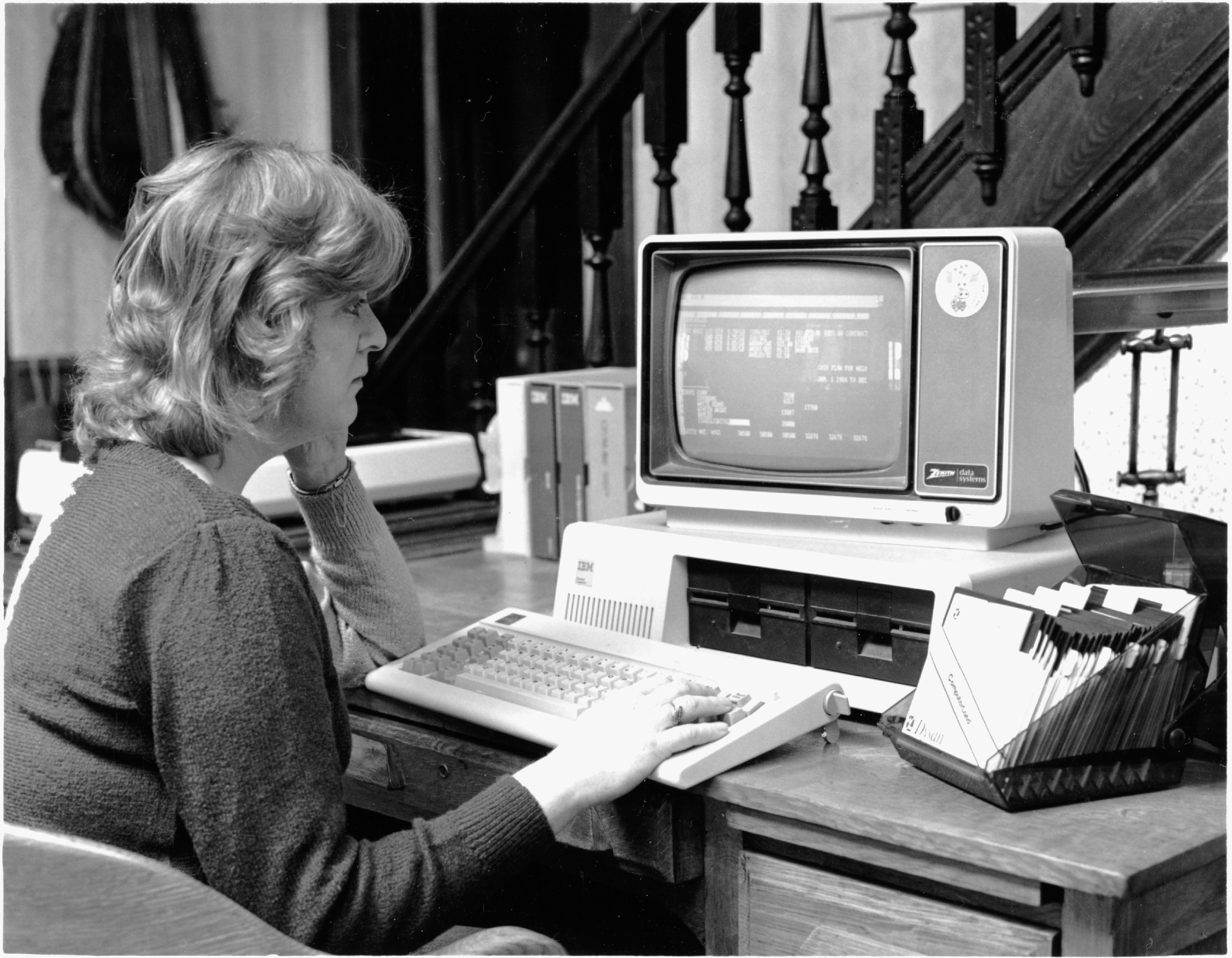
From top to bottom, left to right: Ronald Reagan is shot after leaving a hotel; Pope John Paul II is wounded in an assassination attempt in St. Peter’s Square; Anwar Sadat is assassinated in Cairo; the 1981 Iranian Prime Minister's office bombing kills 8 Iranian officials; the Hyatt Regency walkway collapse in Kansas City kills 114; MTV launches; STS-1 sends the Space Shuttle Columbia on its first flight; Prince Charles and Lady Diana Spencer get married; and the IBM Personal Computer debut. Postman Pat made his debut on the 16th September 1981.

1981 (MCMLXXXI) was a common year starting on Thursday of the Gregorian calendar, the 1981st year of the Common Era (CE) and Anno Domini (AD) designations, the 981st year of the 2nd millennium, the 81st year of the 20th century, and the 2nd year of the 1980s decade.

== Events ==
=== January ===
- January 1
  - Greece enters the European Economic Community, predecessor of the European Union.
  - Palau becomes a self-governing territory.
- January 6 – A funeral service is held in West Germany for Nazi Grand Admiral Karl Doenitz following his death on December 24.
- January 10 – Salvadoran Civil War: The FMLN launches its first major offensive, gaining control of most of Morazán and Chalatenango departments.
- January 15 – Pope John Paul II receives a delegation led by Polish Solidarity leader Lech Wałęsa at the Vatican.
- January 20 – Iran releases the 52 Americans held for 444 days, minutes after Ronald Reagan is sworn in as the 40th President of the United States, ending the Iran hostage crisis.
- January 21 – The first DeLorean automobile, a stainless steel sports car with gull-wing doors, rolls off the production line in Dunmurry, Northern Ireland.
- January 24 – An earthquake of M_{s} 6.8 magnitude in Sichuan, China, kills 150 people. Japan suffers a less serious earthquake on the same day.
- January 25 – In South Africa the largest part of the town Laingsburg is swept away within minutes by one of the strongest floods ever experienced in the Great Karoo.
- January 27 – The Indonesian passenger ship Tampomas II catches fire and capsizes in the Java Sea, killing 580 people.

=== February ===
- February 4 – Gro Harlem Brundtland becomes Prime Minister of Norway.
- February 8 – In Greece, 20 fans of Olympiacos F.C. and 1 fan of AEK Athens die, while 54 are injured, after a stampede at the Karaiskakis Stadium in Piraeus, possibly because Gate 7 does not open immediately after the end of the game.
- February 9 – Polish Prime Minister Józef Pińkowski resigns and is replaced by General Wojciech Jaruzelski.
- February 14 – Stardust fire: A fire at the Stardust nightclub in Artane, Dublin, Ireland, in the early hours kills 48 young people and injures 214. In 2024 these will be declared as unlawful killings.
- February 17–22 – Pope John Paul II visits the Philippines.
- February 23 – 1981 Spanish coup d'état attempt ("23-F"): Antonio Tejero, with members of the Guardia Civil, enters the Spanish Congress of Deputies and stops the session where Leopoldo Calvo-Sotelo is about to be named president of the government. The coup fails after being denounced by King Juan Carlos.
- February 24 – A powerful M_{s} 6.7 magnitude earthquake hits Athens, killing 22 people, injuring 400 people and destroying several buildings and 4,000 houses, mostly in Corinth and the nearby towns of Loutraki, Kiato and Xylokastro.

=== March ===
- March 1 – 1981 Irish hunger strike: Bobby Sands, a Provisional Irish Republican Army member, begins a hunger strike for political status at HM Prison Maze (Long Kesh) in Northern Ireland, dying on May 5, the first of 7 IRA and 3 INLA hunger strikers to die.
- March 11 – Chilean military dictator Augusto Pinochet is sworn in as President of Chile for another 8-year term.
- March 17 – In Italy, the Propaganda Due Masonic lodge is discovered.
- March 19 – Two or three workers are killed and four are injured during a ground test of Space Shuttle Columbia at Kennedy Space Center in the United States.
- March 29 – The first London Marathon starts, with 7,500 runners.
- March 30 – Attempted assassination of Ronald Reagan: U.S. President Ronald Reagan is shot in the chest outside a Washington, D.C., hotel by John Hinckley Jr.; two police officers and Press Secretary James Brady are also wounded.

=== April ===
- April 4 – UK pop group Bucks Fizz's song "Making Your Mind Up" wins the 1981 Eurovision Song Contest in Dublin, Ireland.
- April 11 – 1981 Brixton riot: Rioters in south London, UK, throw petrol bombs, attack police and loot shops.
- April 12 – The Space Shuttle program: Space Shuttle Columbia, with NASA astronauts John Young and Robert Crippen, launches on the STS-1 mission, returning to Earth on April 14. It is the first time a crewed reusable spacecraft has returned from orbit.

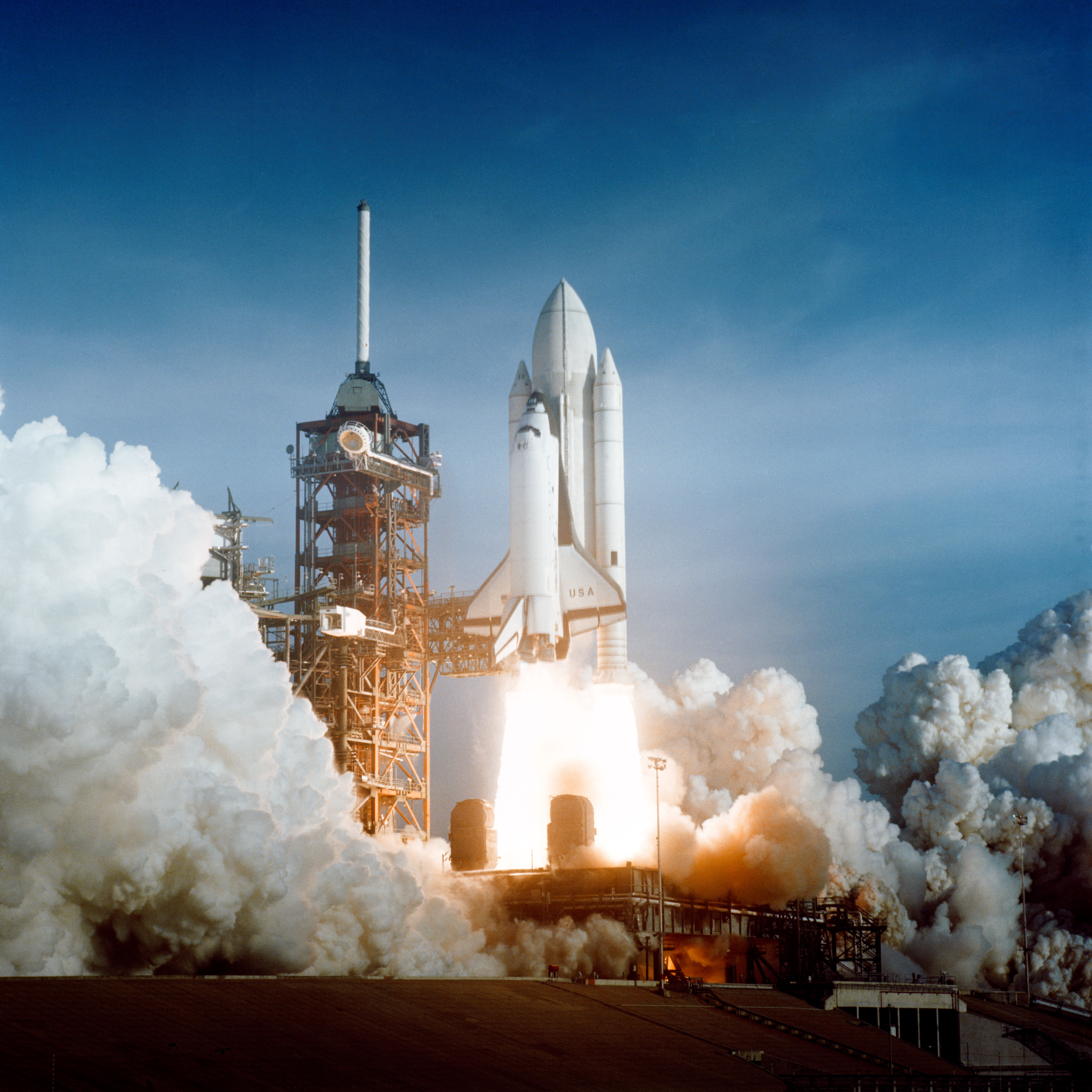
April 12: First Space Shuttle launch: Columbia, April 12, 1981

- April 15 – The first Coca-Cola bottling plant in China is opened.
- April 18 – A Minor League Baseball game between the Rochester Red Wings and the Pawtucket Red Sox at McCoy Stadium in Pawtucket, Rhode Island, becomes the longest professional baseball game in history: 8 hours and 25 minutes/33 innings (the 33rd inning is not played until June 23).
- April 26 – French presidential election: A first-round runoff results between Valéry Giscard d'Estaing and François Mitterrand.

=== May ===
- May – Daniel K. Ludwig abandons the Jari project in the Amazon basin.
- May 1 – Pensions in Chile: The new Chilean pension system, based on private pension funds, begins.
- Aer Lingus flight 164 is hijacked just before landing at London Heathrow airport. The flight continues on to France before the hijacker who reportedly demanded for the releasing of the third secret of Fatima, is subdued.
- May 6 – A jury of architects and sculptors unanimously selects Maya Lin's design for the Vietnam Veterans Memorial in Washington, D.C., from among 1,421 other entries.
- May 11 – The Jamaican reggae singer Bob Marley dies at age 36 from cancer.
- May 13 – Pope John Paul II assassination attempt: Pope John Paul II is shot by Mehmet Ali Ağca, a Turkish gunman, as he enters St. Peter's Square in Vatican City to address a general audience. The Pope recovers.
- May 15 – A prison officer, 31-year-old Donna Payant, disappears at Green Haven Correctional Facility in New York. She is later found to have been murdered by convicted serial killer Lemuel Smith. It is the first time a female prison officer has been killed while on duty in the United States.
- May 21 – François Mitterrand becomes the first socialist President of the French Fifth Republic.
- May 22 – Serial killer Peter Sutcliffe is found guilty and sentenced to life imprisonment on 13 counts of murder and 7 of attempted murder in England.
- May 25 – In Riyadh, the Gulf Cooperation Council is created among Bahrain, Kuwait, Oman, Qatar, Saudi Arabia and the United Arab Emirates.
- May 26 – The Italian Forlani government resigns over its links to the fascist Masonic cell Propaganda Due.
- May 30 – Bangladeshi President Ziaur Rahman is assassinated in Chittagong.
- May 31 – Burning of Jaffna library, one of the most violent examples of ethnic biblioclasm of the century.

=== June ===
- June 5 – The Centers for Disease Control and Prevention in the United States report that five homosexual men in Los Angeles have a rare form of pneumonia seen only in patients with weakened immune systems, the first recognized cases of AIDS.
- June 6 – Bihar train disaster: Seven coaches of an overcrowded passenger train fall off the tracks into the Bagmati River in Bihar, India, killing between 500 and 800.
- June 7 – Operation Opera: The Israeli Air Force destroys Iraq's Osirak nuclear reactor, killing ten Iraqi troops and a French technician.
- June 10 – Alfredo Rampi, a 6-year-old boy, falls into an artesian well in Vermicino, near Rome. After nearly three days of failed rescue attempts followed with bated breath from all over Italy, Alfredo dies inside the well, at a depth of 60 meters (200 ft).
- June 12 – Raiders of the Lost Ark, the first film of the Indiana Jones franchise is released in theaters in the United States.
- June 13 – At the Trooping the Colour ceremony in London, teenager Marcus Sarjeant fires 6 blank shots close to Queen Elizabeth II, startling her horse.
- June 18
  - The Organization of Eastern Caribbean States is founded.
  - The Lockheed F-117 Nighthawk Stealth Fighter makes its first flight at Groom Lake (Area 51), Nevada.
- June 22 – Iranian president Abolhassan Banisadr is deposed.
- June 27
  - The first game of paintball is played, in Henniker, New Hampshire, United States.
  - The E-mu Emulator sampler keyboard with floppy disk operation is unveiled at NAMM international Sound & Music Expo, Chicago. Production Model Serial Number 001 is issued to Stevie Wonder.

=== July ===
- July 1 – Wonderland murders: The Wonderland Gang of cocaine dealers is brutally murdered in Los Angeles. Eddie Nash is suspected of involvement, but will never be convicted.
- July 3 – The Toxteth riots in Liverpool, England, start after a mob prevents a youth from being arrested. Shortly afterward, the Chapeltown riots in Leeds start amid increased racial tension.
- July 7 – United States President Ronald Reagan nominates the first woman, Sandra Day O'Connor, to the Supreme Court of the United States.
- July 9 – Donkey Kong is released in Japan by Nintendo, marking the first release in both the Donkey Kong and Mario series of games. The arcade game proves to be Nintendo's first major hit.
- July 10
  - Mahathir Mohamad becomes the 4th Prime Minister of Malaysia.
  - 1981 Handsworth riots in Birmingham begin, followed by further 1981 England riots in several urban areas including Liverpool and Leeds.
- July 16–21 – England become the first team this century to win a cricket Test match after the follow-on when they beat Australia by 18 runs at Headingley cricket ground, Leeds, England.
- July 17
  - Hyatt Regency walkway collapse: Two skywalks filled with people at the Hyatt Regency Hotel in Kansas City, Missouri, collapse into a crowded atrium lobby, killing 114.
  - Lebanese Civil War: Israeli aircraft bomb Beirut, destroying multi-story apartment blocks containing the offices of PLO-associated groups, killing approximately 300 civilians and resulting in worldwide condemnation and a U.S. embargo on the export of aircraft to Israel.
- July 19 – The 1981 Springbok Tour commences in New Zealand, amid controversy over the support of apartheid.
- July 21 – Panda Tohui is born in Chapultepec Zoo in Mexico City, the first panda to ever be born and survive in captivity outside of China.
- July 29 – A worldwide television audience of over 750 million people watch the Wedding of Prince Charles and Lady Diana Spencer at St Paul's Cathedral in London, UK.
- July 30 – 1981 Polish hunger demonstrations: As many as 50,000 demonstrators, mostly women and children, take to the streets in Łódź to protest about food ration shortages in Communist Poland.

=== August ===
August 1, 1981: MTV cable network begins

- August 1 – The first 24-hour video music channel MTV (Music Television) is launched in the United States and airs its first video, "Video Killed the Radio Star" by The Buggles.
- August 9 – 1981 Major League Baseball strike ends in the United States, and Major League Baseball resumes with the All-Star Game in Cleveland's Municipal Stadium.
- August 12 – The original Model 5150 IBM PC (with a 4.77 MHz Intel 8088 processor) is released in the United States at a base price of $1,565.
- August 19 – Gulf of Sidra incident: Libyan president Muammar Gaddafi sends two Sukhoi Su-22 fighter jets to intercept two U.S. Navy fighters over the Gulf of Sidra. The U.S. jets destroy the Libyan fighters.
- August 23 – South African troops attack SWAPO bases in Xangongo and Ongiva, Angola, during Operation Protea.
- August 24 – Mark David Chapman is sentenced to 20 years to life in prison after pleading guilty to murdering John Lennon in Manhattan eight months earlier.
- August 27 – North Korea fires a surface-to-air missile at a U.S. SR-71 Blackbird spy plane flying in South Korean and international airspace. The missile misses and the airplane is unharmed.
- August 30 – 1981 Iranian Prime Minister's office bombing: Eight people, including the country's president and prime minister, are killed when a briefcase explodes in the building. The office of Iran's Prosecutor General blames the People's Mujahedin of Iran.
- August 31 – A bomb explodes at the United States Ramstein Air Base in West Germany, injuring 20 people.

=== September ===
- September – Little Miss Bossy, the first book in the Little Miss series (the female counterpart to the Mr. Men series) is first published, in the U.K.
- September 1 – Gregorio Conrado Álvarez is inaugurated as a military de facto President of Uruguay.
- September 4 – An explosion at a mine in Záluží, Czechoslovakia, kills 65 people.
- September 7 – British plantation company Guthrie is taken over by the Malaysian government after successfully purchasing shares to become the major shareholder. This is famously called the 'Dawn Raid attack'.
- September 10 – Picasso's painting Guernica is moved from New York to Madrid.
- September 15
  - Our Lady of Akita in Japan cries for the last time, on the Feast of Our Lady of Sorrows.
  - The John Bull becomes the oldest operable steam locomotive in the world, at 150 years old, when it operates under its own power outside Washington, D.C.
- September 17 – Ric Flair defeats Dusty Rhodes to win his first World Heavyweight Wrestling Championship in Kansas City.
- September 18 – France's National Assembly votes to abolish Capital punishment in France.
- September 19 – Solidarity Day march, in support of organized labor, draws approximately 250,000 people in Washington, D.C.
- September 20 – The overcrowded ferry boat Sobral Santos II capsizes in the Amazon River, Óbidos, Brazil, killing at least 300 people.
- September 21 – Belize, formerly British Honduras, gains its independence from the United Kingdom.
- September 22 – A Northrop F-5 crashes during a military exercise, in Babaeski, Turkey, killing 1 crew and 65 soldiers on ground.
- September 25 – Sandra Day O'Connor takes her seat as the first female justice of the U.S. Supreme Court.
- September 26
  - The Boeing 767 airliner makes its first flight.
  - The Sydney Tower opens to the public in Australia.
- September 27 – TGV high-speed rail service between Paris and Lyon, France, begins.
- September 27–29 – Iran–Iraq War: Iranian forces break the Siege of Abadan in Operation Samen-ol-A'emeh.

=== October ===
- October 5 – Raoul Wallenberg posthumously becomes an honorary citizen of the United States.
- October 6 – Egyptian President Anwar Sadat is assassinated during a military parade.
- October 10 – The Ministry for Education of Japan issues the jōyō kanji.
- October 14 – Vice President Hosni Mubarak is elected President of Egypt, one week after the assassination of Anwar Sadat during a parade, by servicemen who belong to the Egyptian Islamic Jihad organization led by Khalid Islambouli and oppose his negotiations with Israel.
- October 16 – Gas explosions at a coal mine at Hokutan, Yūbari, Hokkaidō, Japan, kill 93 people.
- October 21 – Andreas Papandreou becomes Prime Minister of Greece.
- October 22 – The founding congress of the Nepal Workers and Peasants Organization faction led by Hareram Sharma and D. P. Singh begins.
- October 26 – Urho Kekkonen, the 8th President of Finland, resigns after being the longest-serving Finnish president since 1956.
- October 27 – Soviet submarine S-363 runs aground outside the Karlskrona, Sweden, military base, leading to a minor international incident.
- October 30 – Venera program: Venera 13 is launched to Venus.

=== November ===
November 1: Antigua and Barbuda.

- November 1 – Antigua and Barbuda gains independence from the United Kingdom.
- November 4 – Venera program: Venera 14 is launched to Venus.
- November 9 – Slavery in Mauritania is abolished by Edict No. 81-234.
- November 12 – The Church of England General Synod votes to admit women to holy orders.
- November 22 – The Edmonton Eskimos (14–1–1) barely stave off defeat and win a record 4th consecutive Grey Cup in the Canadian Football League, at the 69th Grey Cup at Montreal's Olympic Stadium, defeating the Ottawa Rough Riders (5–11–0) with a score of 26–23 in the final three seconds, after being down 20–1 at halftime.
- November 23
  - Iran–Contra affair: U.S. President Ronald Reagan signs the top secret National Security Decision Directive 17 (NSDD-17), authorizing the Central Intelligence Agency to recruit and support Contra rebels in Nicaragua.
  - 1981 United Kingdom tornado outbreak, the largest recorded tornado outbreak in European history.
- November 25–26 – 1981 Seychelles coup d'état attempt: A group of mercenaries led by Mike Hoare take over Mahe airport. Most of them escape by a commandeered Air India passenger jet; six are later arrested.

=== December ===
- December 1 – An Inex-Adria Aviopromet McDonnell Douglas MD-80 strikes a mountain peak and crashes while approaching Ajaccio Airport in Corsica, killing all 180 people on board.
- December 4 – South Africa grants Ciskei independence, not recognized outside South Africa.
- December 7 – Rotary International charters the Rotary Club of Grand Baie, Mauritius.
- December 8
  - The No. 21 Mine explosion in Whitwell, Tennessee, kills 13.
  - Arthur Scargill becomes President-elect of the National Union of Mineworkers (Great Britain).
- December 10 – During the Ministerial Session of the North Atlantic Council in Brussels, Spain signs the Protocol of Accession to NATO.
- December 11
  - Boxing: Muhammad Ali loses to Trevor Berbick; this proves to be Ali's last-ever fight.
  - El Mozote massacre: In El Salvador, army units kill 900 civilians.
- December 13 – Wojciech Jaruzelski declares martial law in Poland, to prevent the dismantling of the communist system by Solidarity.
- December 15 – 1981 Iraqi embassy bombing in Beirut: An Islamic Dawa Party car bomb destroys the Iraqi Embassy in Lebanon, killing 61 people in one of the earliest significant post-World War II suicide attacks.
- December 17 – American Brigadier General James L. Dozier is kidnapped in Verona by the Italian Red Brigades.
- December 20 – The Penlee lifeboat disaster: While attempting to rescue those on board the Union Star off the coast of South-West Cornwall (England), the lifeboat Solomon Browne is lost with all crew. Sixteen people in all are killed.
- December 28 – The first American test-tube baby, Elizabeth Jordan Carr, is born in Norfolk, Virginia.
- December 31 – A coup d'état in Ghana removes President Hilla Limann's PNP government and replaces it with the PNDC led by Flight Lieutenant Jerry Rawlings.

=== Date unknown ===
- January to March – Heavy snow causes several houses and buildings to collapse in northwestern Japan; 152 are killed.
- Cuba suffers a major outbreak of dengue fever, with 344,203 cases.
- Use of crack cocaine, a smokeable form of the drug, first reported in the United States and Caribbean.
- Luxor AB presents the ABC 800 computer.
- Polybius, an urban legend game, is said to have been released in Portland, Oregon; there is no evidence for its existence.
- The State Council of the People's Republic of China lists the cities of Beijing, Hangzhou, Suzhou and Guilin as those where the protection of historical and cultural heritage, as well as natural scenery, should be treated as a priority project.
- Pepsi enters China.
- Around the end of 1981, China becomes the first country ever to reach a population of 1 billion.
- Scots songwriter and singer, Dick Gaughan recorded Scottish poet, Robert Burns 1783 poem 'Now Westlin' Winds"
- Srimulat, comedian group from Central Java performed on TVRI Jakarta for the first time. It makes the comedian group was known by Indonesian people and had been a legendary comedian group.

== Nobel Prizes ==

- Physics – Nicolaas Bloembergen, Arthur Leonard Schawlow, Kai Siegbahn
- Chemistry – Kenichi Fukui, Roald Hoffmann
- Medicine – Roger Wolcott Sperry, David H. Hubel, Torsten Wiesel
- Literature – Elias Canetti
- Peace – United Nations High Commissioner for Refugees
- Nobel Memorial Prize in Economic Sciences – James Tobin
