= Scott Thorson =

American gigolo and writer (1959–2024)

- Born: January 23, 1959; La Crosse, Wisconsin, U.S.
- Died: August 16, 2024 (aged 65); Los Angeles, California, U.S.
- Other name: Jess Marlow
- Partner: Liberace (1977–1982)

Scott Thorson (January 23, 1959 – August 16, 2024) was an American known for his relationship with and lawsuit against Liberace. Thorson wrote a memoir on his time with Liberace, Behind the Candelabra: My Life with Liberace, which was published in 1988 and adapted into the Emmy-winning film Behind the Candelabra in 2013. Thorson was also a key witness in the trial for the 1981 killings known as the Wonderland murders.

== Relationship with Liberace ==
At the age of 17, Thorson met Liberace in 1976 through his romantic friendship with dancer Bob Street (a friend of Hollywood producer Ray Arnett), who was staging Liberace's shows in Las Vegas. When Thorson was 18, Liberace hired him to act as his personal friend and companion, a position that allegedly included a five-year romantic relationship with lavish gifts, travel, and Liberace's promises that he would adopt and care for Thorson. Liberace claimed that he had "more mink coats and diamonds than Elizabeth Taylor". Liberace also incorporated Thorson into his Las Vegas stage performances: for example, Thorson drove Liberace's Rolls-Royce onstage, and was a dancer.

According to Thorson, Liberace introduced him to pop star Michael Jackson in the late 1970s. Thorson claimed that he had an affair with Jackson for about six years, starting around the release of the Thriller album.

Thorson said that his drug addiction and Liberace's promiscuous behavior caused their relationship to come to an end. Thorson also claimed that it was Liberace who originally started him on the drugs, but then when his habit got out of control, Liberace cut him off from all of his credit cards. Thorson stated that following his plastic surgery, the surgeon provided for him a cocktail of addictive drugs that included cocaine, Quaalude, amphetamine, and Demerol. Thorson stated that since he was so young at the time of meeting Liberace, he would do anything that he could to please the pianist, including getting plastic surgery so that he could resemble Liberace, but he felt that their relationship was one-sided. He called Liberace both generous and possessive.

In 2000, Thorson was among several people featured in the British television documentary Liberace: Too Much of a Good Thing Is Wonderful. In 2002, Thorson was interviewed by Larry King on Larry King Live, during which Thorson confirmed that, in the midst of his relationship with Liberace, he chose to have plastic surgery to look more like Liberace at the pianist's suggestion. Also during the interview with King, Thorson revealed his chin implant had been removed earlier in 2002.

In 2012, while serving a four-year prison sentence for drug and burglary charges, Thorson gave several interviews about his relationship with Liberace. One was with Howard Stern, in June 2013, in which he talked about former lovers and affairs he had when he lived with Liberace. Another interview was on Entertainment Tonight in May 2012, where he stated that memories of his time with Liberace were still difficult for him.

=== Lawsuit and book ===
In 1982, after he was dismissed by Liberace, Thorson filed a $113 million lawsuit against Liberace, part of which was a palimony suit. This was the first same-sex palimony case filed in U.S. history. Thorson decided to sue because he claimed that Liberace threw him out on the streets with nothing. Liberace continued to deny that he was homosexual, and during court depositions in 1984, he insisted that Thorson was never his lover. Throughout their lawsuit, Thorson stated that Liberace referred to him in the media as a disgruntled employee, a liar, a gold digger, and claimed that there was never a sexual relationship between them.

The case was settled out of court in 1986, with Thorson receiving a $95,000 cash settlement, plus three cars and three pet dogs worth another $20,000 (a total of $279,000 today). Thorson visited and reconciled with Liberace shortly before the entertainer's death in February 1987. After Liberace's death, Thorson said he settled the suit because he knew that Liberace was dying, and that Thorson had intended to sue based on conversion of property rather than palimony.

A year after Liberace's death, Thorson published a book about their relationship, Behind the Candelabra: My Life with Liberace.

In the Canadian-American television film Liberace: Behind the Music (1988), Thorson was portrayed by Michael Dolan.

Thorson's book was later adapted into the 2013 film Behind the Candelabra, in which Thorson was played by Matt Damon opposite Michael Douglas as Liberace. The movie aired on HBO on May 26, 2013. The film was directed by Steven Soderbergh from a screenplay by Richard LaGravenese, with music adapted by Academy Award-winning composer Marvin Hamlisch.

== Wonderland murders ==
In 1989, Thorson emerged as a pivotal witness in the prosecution of gangster and owner of the West Hollywood nightclub the Starwood, Eddie Nash, in the 1981 quadruple murders of the Wonderland Gang. For his testimony, Thorson was placed in the federal witness protection program. In 1991, he was shot three times when drug dealers broke into his hotel room in Jacksonville, Florida.

== Legal issues ==
In 2008, Thorson pleaded guilty to felony drug and burglary charges and was sentenced to four years in prison.

In February 2013, police investigating a lost wallet tracked the use of the victim's credit cards to a hotel in Reno, Nevada. Thorson was found to be using the credit cards and was arrested. Thorson (who also used the alias Jess Marlow, which he said he acquired when he entered the protection program in the Nash case) was booked on a variety of charges, including burglary and using a credit card without consent. He pleaded guilty and was sentenced to five years' probation in July 2013. Dennis Hof, owner of the Moonlite BunnyRanch, paid Thorson's $125,000 bail.

As of March 2021 he was completing his term in unsupervised custody in residential confinement, with a projected release date of August 30, 2022 unless paroled earlier.

On May 10, 2021, Thorson's parole was revoked and he was returned to custody. Thorson was incarcerated at Nevada's High Desert Prison, with a release date of September 8, 2022.

== Illness and death ==
Previously diagnosed with hepatitis C, in the autumn of 2012, Thorson was diagnosed with stage II cancer. After his diagnosis, and before his health care became the responsibility of the Nevada Department of Corrections in January 2014, Thorson made public pleas for money to continue his medical treatments. Thorson had planned in 2012 to re-release the book Behind the Candelabra to coincide with the film's release.

In September 2013, he tested positive for methamphetamine, but was given another chance. He subsequently failed drug tests again—twice in October, and again on November 1, 2013. He was arrested on November 19, 2013, after violating a court order to enter an inpatient treatment facility in Reno two weeks earlier. On January 23, 2014, his probation was revoked and he was sentenced to 8 to 20 years in Nevada prison.

Thorson died from cancer and heart disease at a Los Angeles healthcare facility, on August 16, 2024, at the age of 65.
