= Wonderland (2003 film) =

2003 American crime and drama film by James Cox

- Theatrical release poster
- Directed by: James Cox
- Written by: James Cox; Captain Mauzner; Todd Samovitz; D. Loriston Scott
- Produced by: Michael Paseornek; Holly Wiersma
- Starring: Val Kilmer; Kate Bosworth; Lisa Kudrow; Josh Lucas; Dylan McDermott; Tim Blake Nelson; Christina Applegate; Eric Bogosian; Carrie Fisher; Franky G; M. C. Gainey; Janeane Garofalo; Ted Levine; Faizon Love; Natasha Gregson Wagner
- Cinematography: Michael Grady
- Edited by: Jeff McEvoy
- Music by: Cliff Martinez
- Production companies: Flirt Pictures; Emmett/Furla Films
- Distributed by: Lions Gate Films
- Release dates: September 8, 2003 (Toronto International Film Festival); October 3, 2003
- Running time: 104 minutes
- Country: United States
- Language: English
- Budget: $5.5 million
- Box office: $2.4 million

Wonderland is a 2003 American crime drama film, co-written and directed by James Cox and based on the real-life Wonderland Murders that occurred in 1981. The film stars Val Kilmer, Kate Bosworth, Dylan McDermott, Carrie Fisher, Lisa Kudrow, Josh Lucas, Christina Applegate, Tim Blake Nelson, and Janeane Garofalo. Kilmer plays the role of John Holmes, a famous pornographic film star and suspected accomplice in four grisly murders committed in a house at 8763 Wonderland Avenue, in the Laurel Canyon section of Los Angeles. The film uses a nonlinear Rashomon-style narrative structure to present conflicting accounts of the murders from differing perspectives.

== Plot ==
=== John Holmes and Dawn Schiller ===
The girlfriend of John Holmes, Dawn Schiller, is on the streets and picked up by a holy roller after Holmes leaves Schiller in a hotel room. Schiller eventually calls Holmes to come and get her. Holmes arrives at the apartment, and they have sex and snort cocaine in the bathroom. The next morning, while in a motel room, Dawn sees a newscast that states four people were murdered at a rowhouse on Wonderland Avenue, the same one she had earlier been at with Holmes. The story eventually moves on to two city detectives investigating the crime, Sam Nico and Louis Cruz, and their contact with Holmes. Another officer, Billy Ward, intervenes in the investigation.

=== David Lind's story ===
David Lind hears of his friends' murders at Wonderland and soon discovers his girlfriend was there. While at the crime scene, he is picked up by Nico and Cruz. Through Lind's story (told in flashbacks), we are introduced to some of the people who were present at Wonderland. Known as the Wonderland Gang, these people included Ron Launius and his wife Susan; Billy Deverell; Lind's 22-year-old girlfriend Barbara Richardson; and Joy Miller. Ron has a fondness for antique guns and frequently displays them. When he learns that Holmes knows notorious gangster Eddie Nash, he gives Holmes a pair of stolen antique guns to take to Nash, so that Nash can fence them, then the Wonderland Gang can split the loot. (Nash had befriended Holmes because of Holmes' notoriety as the porn film phenomenon Johnny Wadd.)

Holmes takes the guns to Nash, but Nash says the guns are too rare to be sold, as they would be easily recognized, and everyone involved would be apprehended. Rather than return the guns to Holmes, Nash keeps them for himself. Attempting to get back in the gang's good graces, Holmes suggests robbing Nash's home. Ron Launius is initially reluctant to be involved in the robbery, but after Holmes describes the potential loot, he is eager to participate. Holmes volunteers to draw them a map to plan the robbery, since he has visited Nash's house frequently. Holmes then visits Nash to buy drugs. When he exits, he leaves the kitchen door unlocked to give the Wonderland gang easy access.

=== The robbery of Edward Nash ===
Ron, Lind, and Deverell perform the robbery while Tracy McCourt, their getaway driver and lookout, waits in the car. Neither Holmes nor any of the women are present when the robbery occurs. As planned, the thieves enter through the unlocked kitchen door and rob Nash at gunpoint. Lind accidentally fires his gun, wounding Nash's bodyguard, Greg Diles. They abscond with over a million dollars in cash, jewels, and drugs. They bring their loot back to the Wonderland apartment to divide everything up. Holmes is unhappy with his portion, even though he did not participate in the actual robbery and he is in debt to the gang.

Nash discovers Holmes was involved in the robbery. He has Holmes beaten and finds Holmes' little black book. He tells Holmes he will kill every person listed in the book, starting with Holmes' mother, unless Holmes identifies the men who robbed Nash.

=== Retaliation and aftermath ===
The retaliation for the robbery is swift and fatal. On July 1, 1981, Nash's henchmen (and Holmes), led by Diles, gain access to the apartment at Wonderland Avenue. Ron Launius, Deverell, Richardson, and Miller are all beaten to death with striated lead pipes. Lind is not present during the attacks. Diles compels Holmes to deliver blows to Ron. Susan Launius is beaten, but she survives. She is questioned by Nico and Cruz in her hospital bed. She tells them (in a near comatose state) that she does not remember anything, only shadows.

== Cast ==
- Val Kilmer as John Holmes
- Kate Bosworth as Dawn Schiller
- Lisa Kudrow as Sharon Holmes
- Josh Lucas as Ron Launius
- Tim Blake Nelson as Billy Deverell
- Dylan McDermott as David Lind
- Christina Applegate as Susan Launius
- Eric Bogosian as Eddie Nash
- Carrie Fisher as Sally Hansen
- Franky G as Detective Louis Cruz
- M. C. Gainey as Detective Billy Ward
- Janeane Garofalo as Joy Miller
- Ted Levine as Detective Sam Nico
- Faizon Love as Greg Diles
- Natasha Gregson Wagner as Barbara Richardson
- Joleigh Pulsonetti as Alexa
- Joel Michaely as Bruce
- Paris Hilton as Barbie
- Scoot McNairy as Jack
- John Holmes (archival footage) as Johnny Wadd
- Michael Pitt (deleted scenes) as 'Gopher'
- Alexis Dziena (deleted scenes) as Gopher's girlfriend

== Production ==
To tell the story of John Holmes and the Wonderland murders as accurately as possible, director James Cox and producer Holly Weirsma tracked down the real Dawn Schiller and Sharon Holmes. Holmes and Schiller, who had become close friends after John Holmes's death in 1988, acted as consultants for the film.

== Release ==
The film had its world premiere on September 8, 2003 at the 2003 Toronto International Film Festival. The film was given a limited theatrical release by Lions Gate on October 3, 2003.

=== Home media ===
The film was released to DVD by Lions Gate on February 10, 2004. The DVD's bonus features included an audio commentary track by James Cox and co-writer Captain Mauzner, deleted scenes, and a Court TV segment about the Wonderland murders. The release also includes the documentary Wadd: The Life and Times of John C. Holmes, which interviews Los Angeles Times film critic Kenneth Turan, Boogie Nights writer and director Paul Thomas Anderson, and Sharon Holmes.

On October 5, 2010, Lionsgate released the film to Blu-ray. Previous extras from the 2004 DVD were carried over, with the exception of the Wadd documentary.

== Reception ==
On Rotten Tomatoes the film has an approval rating of 34% based on 101 reviews. The site's consensus states: "A sordid and pointless movie with some good performances." On Metacritic it has a score of 43% based on reviews from 36 critics, indicating "mixed or average reviews".

Multiple critics praised the acting of Kilmer, Kudrow, and Bogosian. Roger Ebert wrote "Kilmer is convincing as John Holmes, especially when he pinballs from one emotion to another; we see him charming, ugly, self-pitying, paranoid, and above all in need of a fix". He added "Kudrow's performance is the most intriguing in the movie, and when she goes face to face with Holmes and coldly rejects his appeals for help, we guess maybe he needs her because she's the only adult in his life."

Ed Gonzales of Slant Magazine wrote Kilmer "almost succeeds in redeeming the gaudy expressionism of Wonderland with his interpretation of Holmes's unnervingly palpable desperation. As the broken king of adult cinema, Kilmer babbles and charms and frightens, looking pathetically consumed and eaten away yet viciously driven by his appetites."

Some critics called the Rashomon narrative device confusing, but others defended it, with Nick Dawson of Empire saying "it contributes to the film's freewheeling feel, generated by its pulsing energy and strong soundtrack". Others said the film's characters were underdeveloped, and that the film lacked a significant point of view.

Gonzales of Slant Magazine wrote, "There’s little doubt that Cox wants to leave viewers affected by the emotional depth in Holmes's story, but when his film wears its vulgarity on its sleeve, the whole work ends up feeling far more exploitative than exploratory." Ebert gave the film a mediocre review overall, granting it two out of four stars, and saying: "True crime procedurals can have a certain fascination, but not when they're jumbled glimpses of what might or might not have happened involving a lot of empty people whose main claim to fame is that they're dead."

Critics also compared the film to Boogie Nights, with Jeff Vice of the Deseret News commenting, "Though it's based on a true story, 'Wonderland' feels considerably less real than 'Boogie Nights,' the completely fictional film that was influenced by some of the same material." James Keast of Exclaim! said Wonderland "comes across as the last 40 minutes of Nights turned into a feature." Critic Mark Deming wrote, "While Cox had a sad and compelling true story at his disposal, the results are flat and uninvolving, telling us almost nothing about Holmes or his fall into addiction and desperation, while Boogie Nights made Dirk Diggler's life both tragic and telling".
