= Eddie Nash =

American nightclub owner and criminal (1929–2014)

- Born: Adel Gharib Nasrallah; April 3, 1929; Ramallah, British Palestine
- Died: August 9, 2014 (aged 85); Los Angeles, California, U.S.
- Resting place: Holy Cross Cemetery
- Occupations: Nightclub owner, restaurateur, drug dealer
- Children: 2

Eddie Nash (April 3, 1929 – August 9, 2014; né Adel Gharib Nasrallah) was a Palestine-born American nightclub owner and restaurateur in Los Angeles, as well as a convicted money launderer and drug dealer. Nash was allegedly the mastermind behind the Wonderland murders, but was never convicted, despite multiple arrests and trials.

== Early life ==
Nash was born Adel Gharib Nasrallah in Mandatory Palestine. His family was Orthodox Christian Palestinian from the city of Ramallah, just outside Jerusalem, where Nash's family owned 48 hotels. In the early 1950s, Nash immigrated to the United States with only $7. He briefly found work as an actor and stuntman, and was an expert horseman. In 1952, he appeared in a small role as a character named "Nash" in an episode of the Western series The Cisco Kid.

In the 1960s, Nash opened a hot dog stand called Beef's Chuck on Hollywood Boulevard. By the 1970s, Nash owned several nightclubs and restaurants in Los Angeles, such as the P.J.'s club (shortly afterward renamed Starwood) in West Hollywood, the Soul'd Out club in Hollywood, the Odyssey disco, the Paradise Ballroom, the Seven Seas, Ali Baba's, and The Kit Kat strip club. Nash's clubs attracted diverse groups, as he operated clubs marketed towards gays, heterosexuals, teenagers, African Americans, and other target audiences.

== Criminal career ==
According to police, Nash supplemented his income from owning dozens of Los Angeles nightclubs and restaurants by selling drugs to patrons. He rose to become a crime boss and drug kingpin who had affiliations with the Israeli mafia, the Armenian mafia, and Los Angeles crime family mobster Jimmy Fratianno.

Nash was notorious for his lavish lifestyle and excessive drug use. Despite his participation in illegal activity, Nash maintained a public image as a successful legitimate businessman. By the late 1970s, he had developed an addiction to freebase cocaine, rarely leaving his Studio City mansion, where he consumed drugs and hosted parties. According to John Holmes' second wife Laurie (known as Misty Dawn), in a Playboy magazine interview, "He [Eddie Nash] was an awful man... John told me he used to leave the bathrooms without toilet paper, then offer the young women cocaine if they'd lick his ass clean."

=== Wonderland murders ===
Nash was allegedly involved in the quadruple Wonderland murders in 1981; the suspected motive was as a retaliation for the robbery of Nash's home perpetrated two days earlier by three to five men. A key player in the incident, adult film performer John C. Holmes, was later acquitted of the murders. Nash and Holmes were well acquainted with each other; Nash enjoyed introducing his countless houseguests to Holmes, who was infamous for playing the X-rated movie character "Johnny Wadd."

However, by 1981, Holmes had become desperately addicted to freebasing cocaine, and as a result, his career had declined due to chronic impotence. In order to settle a substantial debt to drug kingpin Ron Launius, leader of the widely feared Wonderland Gang which dominated the Los Angeles cocaine trade, Holmes helped the group plan the invasion. Holmes went to Nash's home on the morning of the attack to leave a sliding door unlocked so the Gang could enter the home. On June 29, 1981, the Wonderland Gang entered into Nash's home via the unlocked sliding door, held Nash and his bodyguard at gunpoint, and stole Nash's drugs, jewelry and money. At one point, one of the Wonderland Gang's member's guns went off, grazing Nash's bodyguard's face. Nash was then made to beg for life on his knees, an act that he found humiliating. Nash quickly suspected John Holmes was involved in the robbery as he had been at Nash's home the morning of the robbery. The following day, a friend of Nash's confirmed his suspicions after telling him he had seen Holmes wearing some of his stolen jewelry.

On July 1, two days after Nash was robbed, Ron Launius, Billy Deverell, Joy Audrey Gold Miller, and Barbara Richardson were found bludgeoned to death at their home at 8763 Wonderland Avenue in Laurel Canyon, Los Angeles. Susan Launius, Ron's wife, was critically injured but survived. Officials from the Los Angeles Police Department (LAPD) remarked that the Wonderland Murders were particularly brutal, noting that the crime scene was bloodier than the Tate-LaBianca murders.

Nash was believed to have planned the murders that were committed by three of his henchmen. Nash planned to kill John Holmes but later decided to spare Holmes' life and use the Wonderland murders to "teach Holmes a lesson". Holmes later told his first wife, Sharon, he was forced to accompany three gunmen to the Wonderland Avenue home. He claimed he was then held at gunpoint and forced to watch the quadruple murders. While police believe Holmes likely took part in the murders, Holmes would maintain that he never killed anyone.

Nash's bodyguard, Gregory Diles, was arrested on suspicion of murder but was later released due to insufficient evidence. A police search of Nash's home days after the murders revealed a large amount of cocaine. Nash was sentenced to eight years in prison, but a judge released him after just two, purportedly due to Nash's poor health. An associate of Nash later admitted that they had bribed the judge with about $100,000.

=== Bautista murders ===
On September 6 or 7, 1984, Nash's former lover Maureen Bautista and her son Telesforo were stabbed to death by Hells Angels biker Robert Frederick Garceau. Garceau was turned in to the police after he murdered Greg Rambo, who had helped him dispose of the Bautistas' bodies. Rambo's wife, Susan, knew of the Bautista murders and talked to the police under an agreement of immunity.

During the trial, Susan Rambo testified that Harlyn Codd had told her Nash was Telesforo's father, and that Nash once had paid Garceau to fulfill a contract but that Garceau had failed to perform and, as a result, Nash was "looking for" Garceau. At trial, evidence was presented that Garceau murdered Bautista because she threatened to expose Garceau's drug operations to Nash, and Garceau killed her son because Telesforo had witnessed Bautista's murder. Garceau was convicted of all three murders and sentenced to death.

A lengthy court appeal of Garceau's death sentence was begun, but in 1993 the California Supreme Court upheld the legality of what became known as "The Nash testimony." Garceau died from cancer on San Quentin's death row on December 29, 2004.

=== Acquittal and conviction ===
Authorities accumulated enough evidence to bring Nash and Diles to trial after Scott Thorson began providing investigators with new information.

In 1990, Nash was tried in state court for having planned the Wonderland murders; the trial resulted in an 11–1 hung jury. Nash would later admit that he had bribed the lone holdout, a young woman, with $50,000. The retrial ended in an acquittal.

Throughout the 1990s, law enforcement figures continued to hound Nash, who had been referred to in various print media as "the one who got away". In 1995, in a broad series of raids targeting alleged organized crime figures, federal agents armed with search warrants raided Nash's house and confiscated what was thought to be a cache of methamphetamine. To the chagrin of law enforcement, the "meth" turned out to be a cache of mothballs, and no charges were filed against Nash.

In 2000, after a four-year joint investigation involving local and federal authorities, Nash was arrested and indicted on federal charges under the Racketeer Influenced and Corrupt Organizations Act (RICO) for running a drug trafficking and money laundering operation, conspiring to carry out the Wonderland Murders, and bribing one of the jurors of his first trial. Nash, by this point in his seventies, and suffering from emphysema and several other ailments, agreed to a plea bargain agreement in September 2001, pleading guilty to RICO charges and to money laundering. He also admitted to jury tampering (for which the statute of limitations had run out) and to having ordered his associates to retrieve stolen property from the Wonderland house, which might have resulted in violence including murder, but he denied having planned the murders that occurred. He also agreed to cooperate with law enforcement authorities. In exchange, he received a four-and-a-half year prison sentence (including time already served) and a $250,000 fine.

== Death ==
On August 9, 2014, Nash died at the age of 85.

== In popular culture ==
=== Films ===
- In the movie Boogie Nights (1997), Alfred Molina plays a character named Rahad Jackson, whose bodyguard, home, and living situation are heavily influenced by Nash's.
- In the movie Wonderland (2003), Nash is portrayed by actor Eric Bogosian.
- In the biographical film Behind the Candelabra (2013), Nicky Katt portrays Mr. Y, a pseudonymous depiction of Nash's role in the life of Scott Thorson.

=== Music ===
- The 2026 album Days by American indie rock band the Mountain Goats includes a song called "Crying on Eddie Nash's Grave".
