= Wonderland Gang =

Drug gang in Los Angeles (1970s & 1980s)

- Named after: Headquarters location on Wonderland Avenue
- Years active: Late 1970s - Early 1980s
- Territory: Laurel Canyon, Los Angeles
- Membership: 7 members
- Leader: Ron Launius
- Activities: Cocaine trade Burglary and armed robbery

The Wonderland Gang was a group of drug dealers involved in the Los Angeles cocaine trade during the late 1970s and early 1980s; their home base was located on Wonderland Avenue in the Laurel Canyon neighborhood of Los Angeles, California. On July 1, 1981, three members and one associate of the gang died in the Wonderland murders (also known as the "Four on the Floor murders" or the "Laurel Canyon murders").

== Overview ==
The Wonderland Gang mainly trafficked in the burgeoning cocaine trade of the era, but despite its role as the most influential and feared cocaine distributorship of its time in Los Angeles, some of its members were heroin addicts. Drugs were regularly dealt from the residence at 8763 Wonderland Avenue in the Laurel Canyon area of Los Angeles.

The two bedroom split-level house was leased in Joy Miller's name. Miller and her live-in boyfriend, Billy DeVerell, were the usual residents; Ron Launius and his wife, Susan, were house guests.

David Lind, ordinarily a resident of the Sacramento area, came to Los Angeles in the summer of 1981 at Launius' behest, to aid in their growing drug-distribution business. Lind and Launius had become friends while in prison and promised to deal drugs together upon their release. Lind and his girlfriend, Barbara Richardson, rode down to the Wonderland house on Lind's motorcycle and slept on the living room sofa.

Adult-entertainment legend John Holmes, famous at the time for his portrayal of the detective character Johnny Wadd in a series of pornographic films, was a frequent visitor who would purchase or scrounge cocaine from the gang.

Although the Wonderland Gang was mainly known for its drug sales, which concentrated on cocaine and the occasional heroin deal, the gang also gained revenues through burglaries and armed robberies of rival drug dealers. It was this last line of "business", particularly the armed robbery of Eddie Nash, that ultimately led to the group's sudden and violent end.

== Members and associates ==
Members of the gang included:

- Ronald Lee "Ron" Launius (May 18, 1944 – July 1, 1981) (Leader)
- William Raymond "Billy" DeVerell (February 14, 1937 – July 1, 1981)
- David Clay Lind (October 24, 1938 – November 16, 1995)
- Tracy Raymond McCourt (February 20, 1949 – October 18, 2006)
- Joy Audrey Gold Miller (May 14, 1935 – July 1, 1981) (DeVerell's girlfriend and the house leaseholder)

Their associates included:

- Susan A. Murphy Launius (born 1951) (Launius' wife)
- Barbara Lee "Butterfly" Easton Richardson (October 15, 1958 – July 1, 1981) (Lind's girlfriend)

=== Ron Launius ===
Ronald Lee Launius was a United States Air Force veteran of the Vietnam era, who had been dishonorably discharged and convicted of smuggling heroin from Vietnam back to the United States in the coffins of American service members.

Reportedly, at the time of his death, police investigators in California, largely in the Sacramento area, had 27 open homicide cases they believed were perpetrated by Launius. In May 1974, he was arrested for and charged with the 1973 murder of a reputed police drug informant who had been killed over a botched drug deal. After a key witness for the prosecution died in an unrelated police shootout, the murder charges against Launius were dropped. That year, however, Launius was convicted of smuggling heroin and cocaine across the US/Mexico border and eventually served three years of an eight-year sentence in a federal prison.

A California police officer described the blond, bearded Launius as "one of the coldest people I ever met".

Launius was known for remaining composed under pressure. Launius' brazen and fearless nature led both to his dominance in the drug trade as well as his demise, stemming from the events leading up to his death in the Wonderland Murders. Launius and Susan Murphy, were married in Carson City, Nevada, on April 16, 1971.

=== Billy DeVerell ===
William Raymond DeVerell was Launius' right-hand man and a voice of reason. David Lind characterized him as an otherwise decent individual who had been lured into the drug world because of the easy money and indicated that DeVerell experienced periods of self-loathing for his actions, during which he expressed a desire to stop dealing and using illegal drugs.

DeVerell was an overhead crane operator – and heroin user – who had been arrested 13 times in relation to his addiction, which is part of the reason why he stayed in the gang. The autopsy performed after his murder identified numerous injection scars on his forearms, in addition to hyperplasia of the lymph nodes – a common sign of narcotics abuse.

=== David Lind ===
David Clay Lind was a biker, heroin addict, and member of the Aryan Brotherhood who befriended Launius when the two men served time in prison together. In 1981, at Launius' behest, Lind traveled to Los Angeles to join the Wonderland gang and assist them in running drugs. By the time of the Wonderland murders, Lind had been incarcerated several times for armed burglary, forgery, assault, and assault with the intent to commit rape. Specifically at the time of the murder, Lind testified in court that he was at a motel in the San Fernando Valley, consuming drugs with a male prostitute. Lind's position in the drug underworld was and remains murky due to allegations by rival drug dealers that he worked as a police informant.

=== Tracy McCourt ===
Tracy Raymond McCourt was the driver of the stolen 1975 Ford Granada that carried the Wonderland Gang to Eddie Nash's home on the night of the robbery. Originally, McCourt was designated to take part in the home invasion itself, but a day or so before the event, conspirator David Lind (who derisively referred to McCourt as "Titmouse Tracy") took away McCourt's handgun, and McCourt was relegated to driving duty.

In the years following the Wonderland murders, McCourt was reported to have moved to Colorado. He spent considerable time in the Colorado prison system, but when he was free he operated a successful mobile phone franchise. In 2001, he reportedly had been wanted by the Colorado Springs Police Department for "assault with a deadly weapon and failure to comply on the original charge of distribution of a Schedule II controlled substance".

Tracy Ray died on October 18, 2006, in Colorado.

=== Joy Miller ===
Joy Audrey Gold Miller was Billy DeVerell's girlfriend and the leaseholder of the Wonderland townhouse. Miller had two adult daughters and was the ex-wife of a Beverly Hills attorney. Miller was a heroin user who had fallen in with the Wonderland Gang through her self-immersion in drug culture. By the time Holmes had become involved with the group, Miller had been arrested seven times, been treated for breast cancer, and six months before had had a double mastectomy. Holmes claimed this did nothing to reduce her opiate usage.

=== Associates ===
==== Susan Launius ====
Susan A. Murphy Launius, then 30, while not an official member of the gang, was married to gang member Ron Launius and had a drug habit. She was the sole survivor of the attack – suffering severe head injuries, amnesia, and a severed finger.

==== Barbara Richardson ====
Barbara Lee Easton married Walter Richardson in 1977 after graduating from Sacramento Cordova high school in 1976. Richardson, who was 22 at the time of her death, was associated with David Lind. Lind claimed she was his girlfriend, though he was 20 years older than her, and she was married. Both Richardson and Lind were said to be police informants in the Sacramento area not long before they traveled to southern California. Richardson's official autopsy report documented that she possessed intravenous drug injection site scars.

== Wonderland murders ==
=== Nash robbery ===
On June 29, 1981, the Wonderland Gang, comprising Ron Launius, Billy DeVerell, David Lind, Tracy McCourt, and their associate, John Holmes, conspired to launch a home invasion and robbery upon Eddie Nash, a reputedly powerful organized crime figure who usually referred to himself in the third person as "The Nash". The robbery was an inside job set up by Holmes, who was a close associate of Nash's, and whom Nash regularly referred to as "my brother". Early in the morning of the robbery, Holmes visited Nash's mansion ostensibly to party and to buy drugs, but on his way out, left the patio door to the kitchen unlatched. The objective of the robbery was to steal a hoard of cash, heroin, and cocaine that Holmes claimed was in a safe embedded in Nash's bedroom floor, as well as to retrieve some antique guns the Wonderland Gang had stolen from another businessman and then subsequently, using Holmes as an intermediary, sold to Nash in exchange for drugs.

Holmes actually went to Nash's three times that morning. The first time, he forgot to unlatch the patio door; the second time, he did so but returned to the Wonderland hideout only to find some of the gang members were extremely high on heroin. After the members recovered, Holmes was worried that the patio door may have been locked again, so he returned to Nash's a third time, purchased some crack cocaine, ensured the door was unlatched, and notified the gang that the home was ready for invasion.

Launius, DeVerell, and Lind performed the invasion and robbery, while McCourt waited outside in a stolen Ford Granada and served as lookout. To avoid leaving any identifying traces, the men had previously dipped their fingers in a product known as "Liquid Band-Aid" so as to not leave any fingerprints behind. The men entered the property through the sliding glass door Holmes had left unlocked, and confronted Nash and his bodyguard, Gregory Diles, pretending to be police officers. As they were handcuffing both men, Lind accidentally shot Diles in the back after Launius bumped into him, injuring the bodyguard. Nash asked to pray for his children but was instead forced to open his safe.

The robbery was seemingly successful, having yielded a lucrative haul for the gang; they absconded with more than $1.2 million ($4.2 million today) worth of cocaine, heroin, quaaludes, cash, the antique guns, and jewelry. However, the events of the next several days would reveal this was a Pyrrhic victory, precipitating a chain of events that led to the demise of the gang.

=== Murders ===
Following the robbery, Holmes ended up back at Nash's home. Accounts vary as to how and why Holmes arrived there; according to some sources, Holmes went there himself to try to make himself appear innocent, whereas others claim Holmes was kidnapped by Nash's henchmen when they recognized him walking around wearing some of Nash's jewelry. Scott Thorson, who was buying drugs at Nash's home, wrote in his memoir My Life with Liberace (1988) that Nash had ordered Diles to bring Holmes to Nash's house, which Diles did after finding Holmes walking around Hollywood wearing one of Nash's rings. Thorson claimed to have witnessed Nash order Diles to beat Holmes, and said Nash threatened to kill Holmes and his family, until Holmes identified the people behind the robbery.

Around 3:00 AM, on July 1, two days after the Nash robbery, it is believed Holmes, Diles, and a number of unidentified men entered the Wonderland house and bludgeoned to death Launius, DeVerell, Miller, and Richardson; the weapons were believed to be either hammers or striated metal pipes. Launius' wife, Susan, survived the attack, although she was left with permanent brain damage and lost part of one finger. Neither Lind nor McCourt was present for the attack, as Lind was consuming drugs with a prostitute in the San Fernando Valley, and McCourt was at his own home.

Although neighbors would later report having heard screams, no phone calls were placed to the police until 4:00 pm on July 1, over 12 hours later, when furniture movers working at the house next door heard Susan Launius moaning and went to investigate. When questioned, neighbors said the drug-fueled Wonderland parties often included loud, violent screaming and disruptive noise, so when they heard the murders occurring, they simply believed another party was taking place.

=== Suspects ===
John Holmes was arrested and charged with four counts of murder in March 1982, after his handprint was found in one of the bedrooms. Holmes was acquitted in June 1982, after a three-week trial. It determined that he was an unwilling participant who was forced to watch the attack. He spent 110 days in jail for contempt of court. Holmes died on March 13, 1988, from AIDS complications in Los Angeles.

In 1990, Nash was charged in California state court with having planned the murders, and Diles was charged with participating in the murders, but both men were acquitted in 1991. Diles died in 1997 from liver failure.

== Aftermath ==
As of January 2017, Susan Launius is both the sole survivor of the Wonderland murders and the only living member of the Wonderland Gang.

- Ron Launius, 37, Billy DeVerell, 44, Joy Miller, 46, and Barbara Richardson, 22, all died in the 1981 massacre.
- Susan Launius survived the attack and lives in southern California.
- David Lind died of a heroin overdose on November 16, 1995, aged 55.
- Tracy McCourt died of unspecified causes on October 18, 2006, aged 57.

The fates of others allegedly involved in the Nash robbery or Wonderland attacks are:

- John Holmes died of medical complications due to AIDS on March 13, 1988, aged 43.
- Gregory Diles died of liver failure on January 16, 1997, aged 48.
- Eddie Nash died of unspecified causes on August 9, 2014, aged 85.

Any other assailants who might have participated in the bludgeoning attack on the Wonderland Gang have neither been identified nor prosecuted; their fate and whereabouts are unknown.

== In popular culture ==
=== Film ===
- The film Boogie Nights (1997), which is loosely based on the life of John Holmes, includes a sequence inspired by the initial robbery of Nash's home.
- Wonderland (2003) is a crime-drama film about the Wonderland Murders, starring Val Kilmer (as John "The Wadd" Holmes), Kate Bosworth (as Dawn Schiller), Dylan McDermott (as David Lind), Carrie Fisher (as Sally Hansen), Josh Lucas (as Ron Launius), Christina Applegate (as Susan Launius), Lisa Kudrow (as Sharon Holmes), Janeane Garofalo (as Joy Miller), and Eric Bogosian (as Eddie Nash), and directed by James Cox.

=== Television ===
Numerous television shows have covered the Wonderland murders, such as:

- 20 Most Horrifying Hollywood Murders. E! Entertainment Television. October 21, 2006. Archived from the original on January 13, 2013. A TV movie documentary in which the Wonderland murders ranked #7
- "John Holmes and the Wonderland Murders". E! True Hollywood Story. June 18, 2000. (Season 4, Episode 23)
- "LA: Black Dahlia, John Holmes & Wonderland". Hidden City Los Angeles. Travel Channel. (Season 1, Episode 5)
- "The Wonderland Murders". Murder With Friends. IMDb. October 12, 2016. (Season 1, Episode 4)
- "Wonderland Murderland". Mysteries & Scandals. IMDb. March 30, 2018. (Season 1, Episode 7)
- "Wonderland Murders". Hard Copy. IMDb. August 13, 1998.
