= Ray Arnett =

American producer, choreographer and stage director (1917-2015)

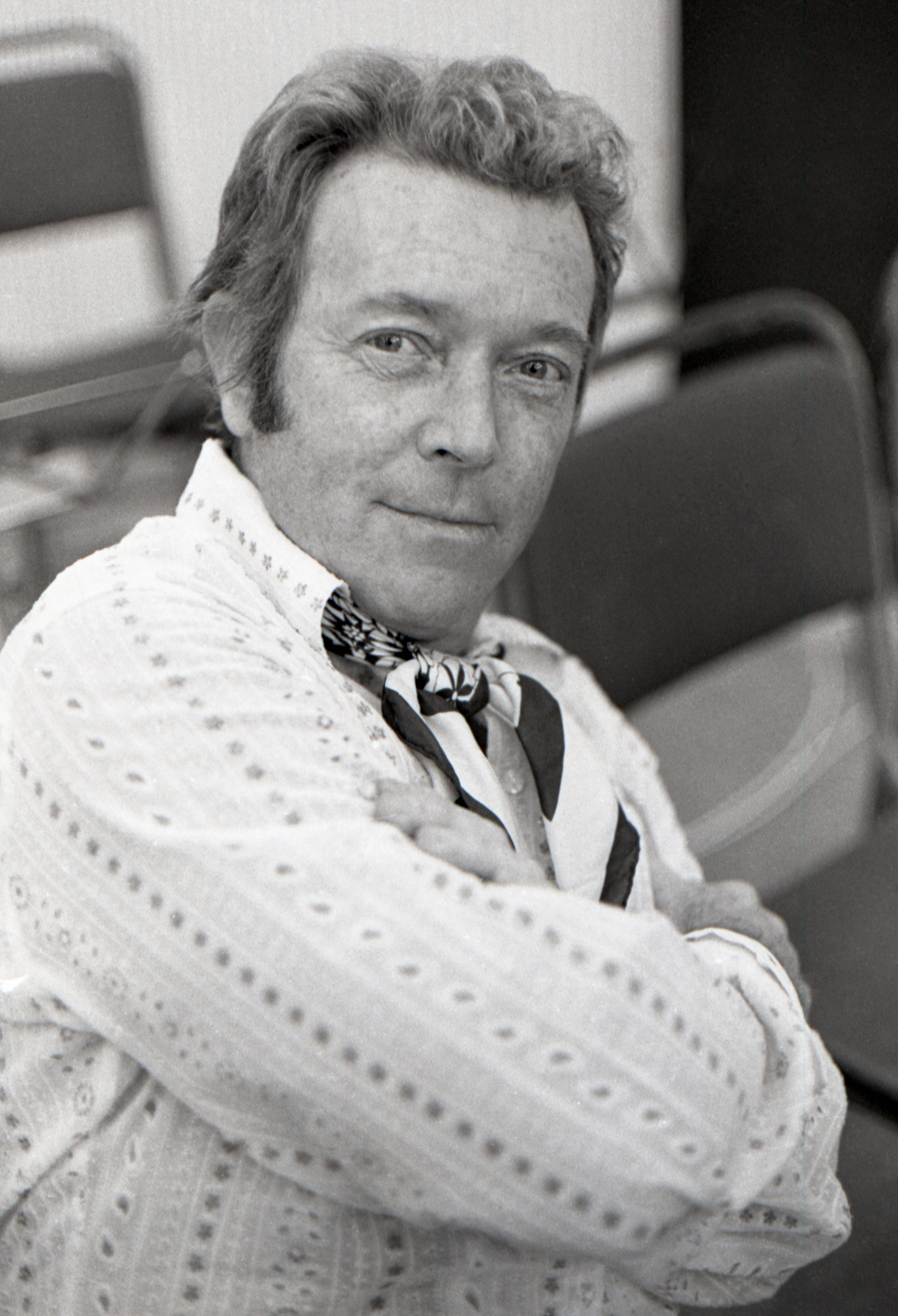
- Portrait taken by Allan Warren in 1968
- Born: September 17, 1917; United States
- Died: March 12, 2015 (aged 97); Beverly Hills, California
- Occupations: Producer, choreographer, stage director

Ray Arnett (September 17, 1917 – March 12, 2015) was an American producer, choreographer and stage director best known for his work with Liberace.

Arnett is also known for introducing Liberace to future partner Scott Thorson.

Arnett was portrayed by actor Tom Papa in the 2013 HBO film Behind the Candelabra.

He died on March 12, 2015, at the age of 97.
