= Behind the Candelabra: My Life with Liberace =

1988 memoir by Scott Thorson and Alex Thorleifson

- Author: Scott Thorson; Alex Thorleifson
- Language: English
- Genre: Memoir
- Publisher: Dutton
- Publication date: June 22, 1988
- Publication place: United States
- Media type: Print

Behind the Candelabra: My Life with Liberace is a memoir by Scott Thorson and Alex Thorleifson, published in 1988 by Dutton, and reissued in 2013. In 2009, it was reported that Thorson was working on a sequel, but as of his death in 2024 it had not materialized.

== Synopsis ==
Scott Thorson recounts his relationship with the entertainer and pianist Liberace.

== Film adaptation ==
The memoir was adapted for a television film, Behind the Candelabra, directed by Steven Soderbergh, starring Michael Douglas and Matt Damon, and premiered on HBO on May 26, 2013.

== See also ==
- "Interview with Scott Thorson (Transcript)". Larry King Live. CNN. August 12, 2002.
