= Highway (2002 film) =

- DVD cover
- Directed by: James Cox
- Written by: Scott Rosenberg
- Produced by: Guy Riedel; Scott Rosenberg
- Starring: Jared Leto; Jake Gyllenhaal; Selma Blair
- Cinematography: Mauro Fiore
- Edited by: Craig Wood
- Music by: Rich Robinson
- Distributed by: New Line Cinema
- Release date: March 26, 2002
- Running time: 97 minutes
- Country: United States
- Language: English
- Budget: $14 million

Highway is a 2002 American independent road comedy-drama film directed by James Cox and written by Scott Rosenberg. The film stars Jared Leto, Jake Gyllenhaal and Selma Blair.

== Plot ==
Set in 1994, the film opens in Las Vegas with Pilot Kelson, a drug dealer, who poses as a valet and takes a customer's Rolls-Royce to give his girlfriend a ride to work. His best friend Jack Hayes is a self-employed pool cleaner, who gets caught having sex with Jilly Miranda, the wife of Burt Miranda, an organized crime figure. While Jack escapes the initial confrontation with Miranda unharmed, Miranda sends a trio of goons (referred to throughout the remainder of the film as "Miranda's Pandas") to break Jack's feet. Jack convinces Pilot to flee and Pilot proposes they go to Seattle without telling him they're going there to see an old fling of Pilot's. They meet with drug dealer Scawldy misleading him of their destination of Detroit. Burt's goons get tipped off where the two are headed and set out to hunt down Jack.

While at a diner, Jack and Pilot intervene when they discover Cassie being assaulted in the diner's parking lot by her pimp. Cassie suggests that she does not know where to go so Jack offers her a lift.

On the way to Seattle, they meet Johnny the Fox, an aging stoner who tags along, save Desmond the Alligator Boy from a group of high school bullies, and ultimately end up in Seattle at the memorial for the recently departed Kurt Cobain. Pilot finds his old crush but is heartbroken to discover she doesn't remember him. Pilot meets up with Jack again and despite their attempts to evade Miranda's Pandas, they are finally cornered and they break both of Jack's feet. However, he has found love with Cassie, and the two of them decide to stay in Seattle while Jack heals. Pilot, meanwhile, decides to head back to Vegas, realizing he cares for Lucy, the girl he left behind.

== Cast ==
- Jared Leto as Jack Hayes
- Jake Gyllenhaal as Pilot Kelson
- Selma Blair as Cassie
- John C. McGinley as Johnny the Fox
- Jeremy Piven as Scawdly
- Frances Sternhagen as Mrs. Murray
- Kimberley Kates as Jilly Miranda
- Mark Rolston as Burt Miranda
- Matthew Davis as Booty
- M. C. Gainey as Steven
- Arden Myrin as Lucy

== Reception ==
Review aggregation website Rotten Tomatoes has not certified the film yet but the reviews have been mixed.
