= Stephen Kelley (make-up artist) =

American make-up artist

- Occupation: Make-up artist
- Years active: 1998–present

Stephen Kelley is an American make-up artist. He won three Primetime Emmy Awards and was nominated for another one in the category Outstanding Makeup for his work on the television program The Sopranos and Saturday Night Live, the television film Behind the Candelabra and the television special Saturday Night Live 50th Anniversary Special.
