= Wonderland murders =

1981 unsolved murder in Los Angeles

Coordinates: 34.1117°N 118.3861°W

- Location: 8763 Wonderland Avenue, Los Angeles, California, U.S.
- Date: July 1, 1981; Early morning (UTC−08:00 Pacific)
- Target: William "Billy" Deverell, Ron Launius, David Lind, Tracy McCourt, Joy Miller
- Attack type: Multiple homicide
- Weapon: Hammers or striated steel pipes
- Deaths: William "Billy" Deverell, Ron Launius, Joy Miller, Barbara Richardson
- Injuries: Susan Launius
- Perpetrator: Unknown
- Accused: John Holmes (acquitted); Gregory Diles (acquitted); Eddie Nash (acquitted)

The Wonderland murders, also known as the Four on the Floor Murders or the Laurel Canyon Murders, are four unsolved murders that occurred in Los Angeles on July 1, 1981. It is assumed that five people were targeted to be killed in the known drug house of the Wonderland Gang, three of whom—Ron Launius, William "Billy" Deverell and Joy Miller—and the girlfriend of an accomplice, Barbara Richardson, died from extensive blunt-force trauma injuries. Only Launius' wife, Susan, survived the attack, allegedly masterminded by organized crime figure and nightclub owner Eddie Nash. Nash, his henchman Gregory Diles and porn actor John Holmes were at various times arrested, tried and acquitted for their involvement in the murders.

== Nash robbery ==
The Wonderland Gang was centered on the occupants of a rented townhouse at 8763 Wonderland Avenue, in the Laurel Canyon area of Los Angeles, California: leader Ronald Lee "Ron" Launius; second-in-command William Raymond "Billy" Deverell; Deverell's girlfriend Joy Audrey Gold Miller, who was also the leaseholder for the townhouse; Tracy Raymond McCourt; and David Clay Lind. All five were involved in drug use and drug dealing.

On June 29, 1981, Launius, Deverell, Lind, and McCourt committed a brutal home invasion and armed robbery at the home of Eddie Nash, a nightclub owner and organized crime figure. The incident resulted in Nash's bodyguard, Gregory Dewitt Diles, being shot and injured. Nash suspected that porn actor John Holmes had been involved, as he had been at Nash's house three times on the morning of the attack (at which times Holmes left the sliding door open). Nash sent Diles to retrieve Holmes for questioning; Diles supposedly spotted Holmes walking around Hollywood wearing one of Nash's rings and brought him back. Scott Thorson, a former boyfriend of Liberace who was in Nash's house to buy drugs, claimed he witnessed Holmes being tied to a chair and repeatedly punched, and his family threatened until he revealed the assailants' identities.

== Wonderland Gang murders ==
Shortly before 3:00 a.m. on July 1, 1981, two days after the robbery, an unknown number of unidentified men entered the Wonderland Avenue townhouse and bludgeoned Launius, Deverell, Miller, and Barbara Richardson (Lind's girlfriend who had been visiting) to death. The weapons used by the killers were believed to be a combination of hammers and metal pipes.

Richardson's bloodied body was found on the living room floor beside the couch where she had been sleeping that night. Miller was found on her bed, with Deverell at the foot of the bed in an upright position leaning against the TV stand; one of the murder weapons, a claw-hammer, was found on the bed. Launius was found beaten to death on his bed with his gravely injured wife, Susan, beside him on the floor. Both bedrooms had been thoroughly searched and ransacked. Despite suffering severe brain damage in the attack, Susan ultimately survived and recovered. Still, she was left with permanent amnesia regarding the night of her attack, had to have part of her skull surgically removed, and lost part of one finger.

Neither Lind nor McCourt was present during the attack. Lind was consuming drugs with a prostitute in a motel, and McCourt was at his own home. Lind died of a heroin overdose in 1995, and McCourt died in 2006.

== Police action and trials ==
Los Angeles Police Department (LAPD) detectives Tom Lange and Robert Souza led the murder investigation and searched Nash's home a few days after the crime. There, they found more than $1 million worth of cocaine, as well as some items stolen from the Wonderland Avenue townhouse.

An initial theory of the murders centered on Holmes. After his left palm print was found at the crime scene on the Launius's headboard, he was arrested and charged with four counts of murder in March 1982. The prosecutor, Los Angeles Deputy District Attorney Ron Coen, attempted to prove that Holmes was a willing participant who betrayed the gang after failing to receive a full share of the loot from the Nash robbery. However, Holmes' court-appointed defense lawyers, Earl Hanson and Mitchell Egers, successfully presented Holmes as one of the victims, who the real killers had forced to give them entry to the house before the murders took place.

After a publicized three-week trial, Holmes was acquitted of all criminal charges on June 26, 1982. He spent 110 days in jail for contempt of court for refusing to testify or cooperate with authorities. Shortly after the murders, in her first newspaper interview in July 1981, Holmes' first wife, Sharon Gebenini Holmes, stated he had told her he had known the people in the Wonderland Avenue townhouse, and had been there shortly before the murders occurred. She did not divulge any additional information to the police. In April 1988, one month after Holmes' death, Gebenini stated in an interview with the Los Angeles Times that on the morning of the murders, Holmes had arrived at her house with blood splattered on his clothes and recounted how he led three thugs to the tightly secured drug house on Wonderland Avenue, escorted them in, and stood by as they bludgeoned the five people inside. She said Holmes never told her the names of the three other assailants.

Holmes died on March 13, 1988, from AIDS complications. One month before he died, two LAPD detectives visited Holmes at the Veterans Administration hospital where he was convalescing to question him about the murders. Nothing came of the visit; Holmes was barely awake, and his responses to their questions were incoherent.

In 1990, Nash was charged in California state court with having planned the murders, and Diles was charged as a participant. Thorson testified against them, but the trial ended with a hung jury vote of 11–1 for conviction. A second trial, in 1991, ended in acquittal for both Nash and Diles. Diles died from liver failure in 1997.

In 2000, after a four-year joint investigation involving local and federal authorities, Nash was arrested and indicted on federal charges under the Racketeer Influenced and Corrupt Organizations Act (RICO) for drug trafficking and money laundering, conspiring to carry out the Wonderland murders, and bribing the sole holdout juror of his first trial. Nash, already in his 70s and suffering from emphysema and other ailments, agreed to a plea bargain in September 2001. He admitted to having bribed the lone holdout in his first trial with $50,000 and pleaded guilty to the RICO charges and money laundering. He also admitted to having ordered his associates to retrieve stolen property from the Wonderland Avenue townhouse, which might have resulted in violence, including murder, yet he denied having planned the murders. Ultimately, Nash received a 4 1/2-year prison sentence and a $250,000 fine. Eddie Nash died in 2014.

== In popular culture ==
=== Films ===
- Boogie Nights (1997), a feature film loosely based on the life of John Holmes, includes a sequence inspired by the initial robbery of Nash's home.
- Wonderland (2003), a drama film about the Wonderland murders, was directed by James Cox and stars Val Kilmer (as John Holmes), Kate Bosworth (as Dawn Schiller), Dylan McDermott (as David Lind), Carrie Fisher (as Sally Hansen), Josh Lucas (as Ron Launius), Christina Applegate (as Susan Launius), Lisa Kudrow (as Sharon Holmes), Tim Blake Nelson (as Billy Deverell), Janeane Garofalo (as Joy Miller), and Eric Bogosian (as Eddie Nash)

=== Television ===
Numerous television shows have covered the Wonderland murders, including:

- Hard Copy: Wonderland Murders (1998)
- E! True Hollywood Story: John Holmes and the Wonderland Murders (E!, 2000) – season 4, episode 23
- 20 Most Horrifying Hollywood Murders (E!, 2006) – ranked Wonderland murders at #7
- Hidden City: Los Angeles: Black Dahlia, John Holmes & Wonderland (Travel Channel, 2011) – season 1, episode 5
- Murder With Friends: The Wonderland Murders (2016) – season 1, episode 4
- Mysteries & Scandals: Wonderland Murderland (2018) – season 1, episode 7
- The Wonderland Massacre & The Secret History of Hollywood (2024) - a documentary series for MGM+

== See also ==
- List of homicides in California
