= Bombing of Lebanon (July 1981) =

Israeli aerial bombardment of Lebanon

- Part of Palestinian insurgency in South Lebanon (the Lebanese Civil War)
Date	17 July 1981
Location	Lebanon

Belligerents
Israel	(Palestine Liberation Organization) PLO: Fatah; DFLP; ALF

Casualties and losses
1 aircraft shot down (claimed by Syria and the PLO; denied by Israel)	123–300+ killed (Palestinian and Lebanese claims)

In July 1981, Israeli warplanes began bombarding a number of Palestine Liberation Organization (PLO) targets across Lebanon, mostly in Beirut and in the south of the country. This was in response to several Palestinian rocket attacks on northern Israel during the Lebanese Civil War.

Buildings, bridges and other infrastructure across Lebanon were either destroyed or badly damaged, and according to Palestinian and Lebanese reports, the operation left from 123 to over 300 killed. Israel vowed to continue fighting the PLO until the latter ceased to launch rockets into Israeli territory, while the PLO said that the bombing would not go unpunished.

== Background ==
The air raids came in response to continuous Palestinian rocket attacks into northern Israel for a third consecutive day. Four women were injured when a Palestinian rocket hit a maternity hospital in Nahariya, as well as three other town residents. This followed the significant amount of Soviet weaponry delivered to the Palestinians, including Katyusha rocket launchers. Air strikes were reported shortly after the Lebanese radio announcement that the country's leftist forces had called for the establishment of a Soviet SA-6 anti-aircraft missile system in Beirut.

== Events ==
=== Bombings and damage ===
The bombing of Beirut on 17 July lasted between 20 and 30 minutes, and was mostly centered on predominantly Muslim districts, such as Rue Baghdadi in the Fakehani district west of the city. Israeli warplanes demolished a seven-story apartment building and four to five others were badly damaged. Israel said that the operation targeted the headquarters of PLO leader Yasser Arafat and of the Democratic Front for the Liberation of Palestine (DFLP), claiming that the Israeli military had managed to destroy the offices of some of the guerrilla groups that form the PLO, including one Fatah and two DFLP offices. The PLO stated that Arafat's headquarters were unharmed and that only one DFLP office sustained some damage.

In addition to Beirut, the port city of Sidon as well as the Sabra and Shatila refugee camps were also attacked. A number of bridges across the Litani and Zahrani rivers, including a vital bridge south of Sidon, Israeli gunboat shelling along the coast between the Saadiyat village in the south and the Zahrani oil terminal had destroyed 200 yards of the main coastal road in the area. The Trans-Arabian Pipeline refinery was also damaged, and a part of it was in flames.

Israel claimed that all of its jets returned home safely, while the PLO and Syria claimed that a plane had been shot down. A Damascus radio report said that the aircraft had been downed by Syrian ground forces in southeastern Lebanon, and that it had crashed near Marjayoun.

=== Casualties ===
Precise casualty figures were not immediately available. There were both Lebanese and Palestinian fatalities, as well as a French volunteer, Nicolas Guillaume Royer, who was killed at a DFLP office. Two Lebanese newspapers published lists of the dead and wounded. Palestinian reports claimed that at least 123 were killed and 550 were wounded, while Lebanon's police put the death toll in Beirut alone at around 90. Lebanon's UN spokesman said that 300 people or more may have been killed.

== Reactions ==
Arafat said in a statement: "The bloodshed today will not go unpunished, and it will only increase our will to keep up the struggle against the American and Zionist criminals." Arafat also told Arab states that he needed "their swords, not their blessing". Israel stressed that it had acted in self-defense, with Prime Minister Menachem Begin warning that the Israeli military would no longer refrain from attacking Palestinian guerrilla targets, even if they were stationed in civilian areas. Begin added that the PLO had "no immunity" anymore, and that if civilians were hit, it would be their fault. At Lebanon's request, the United Nations Security Council held a two-hour emergency meeting, after which it demanded Israel to cease its bombing operations. The United States announced it would delay the planned shipment of F-16 fighter jets to Israel in response to the events.

== See also ==
- 1978 South Lebanon conflict
- 1982 Lebanon War
  - Siege of Beirut
- 1972 Israeli air raid in Syria and Lebanon
