= Záluží (Beroun District) =

- Municipality
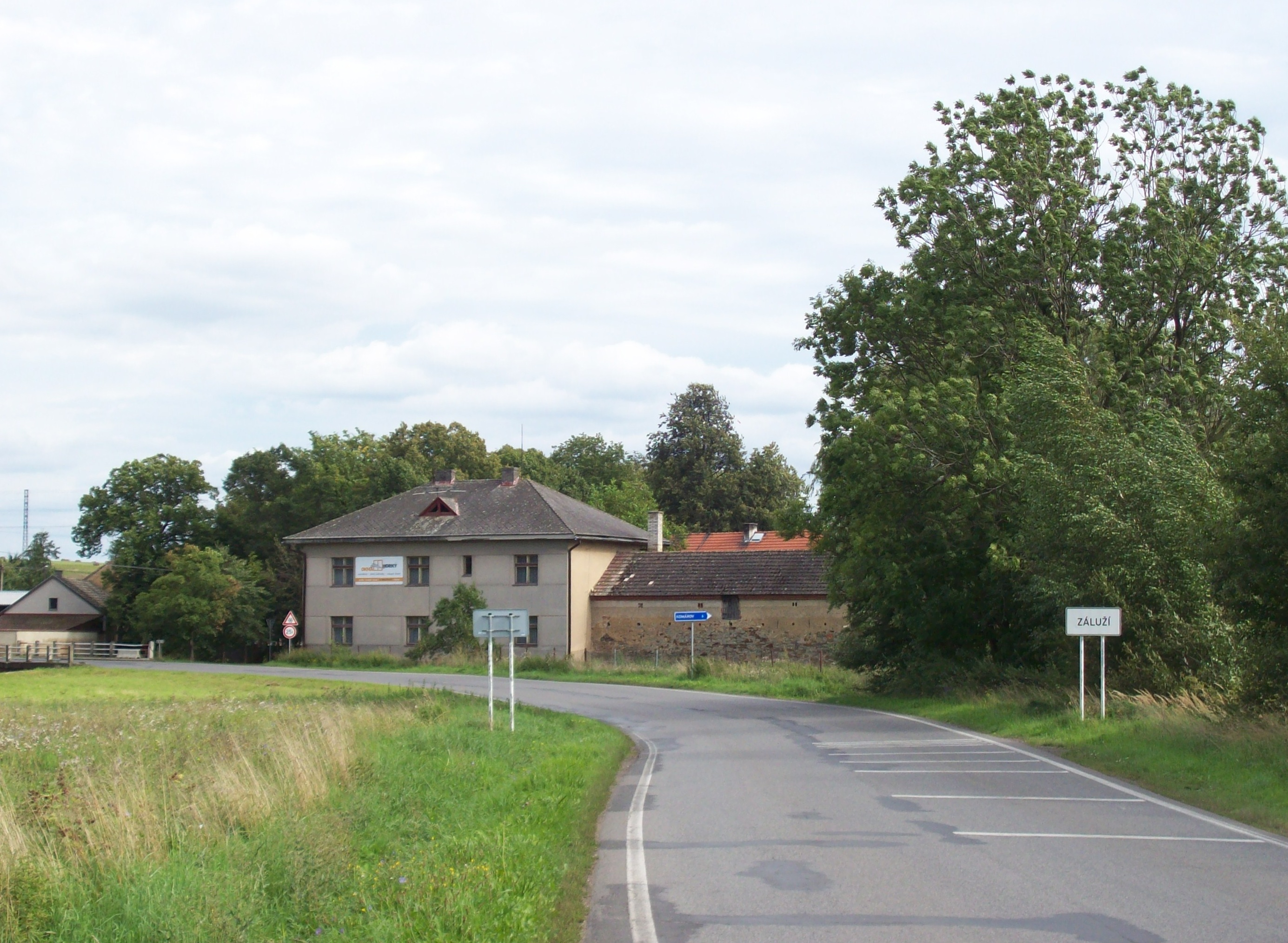
- Entrance to Záluží

- Flag Coat of arms

- Location in the Czech Republic
- Coordinates: 49°50′34″N 13°51′38″E
- Country: Czech Republic
- Region: Central Bohemian
- District: Beroun
- First mentioned: 1331

Area
  - Total: 4.56 km^{2} (1.76 sq mi)
- Elevation: 373 m (1,224 ft)

Population (2026-01-01)
  - Total: 507
  - Density: 111/km^{2} (288/sq mi)
- Time zone: UTC+1 (CET)
  - Summer (DST): UTC+2 (CEST)
- Postal code: 267 61
- Website: www.obeczaluzi.cz

Záluží is a municipality and village in Beroun District in the Central Bohemian Region of the Czech Republic. It has about 500 inhabitants.

== History ==
The first written mention of Záluží is in a charter of King John of Bohemia and House of Zajíc of Valdek from 1331.

== Demographics ==
Historical population
Year	Pop.	±%
1869	518	—
1880	501	−3.3%
1890	516	+3.0%
1900	544	+5.4%
1910	550	+1.1%
1921	526	−4.4%
1930	509	−3.2%
1950	469	−7.9%
1961	496	+5.8%
1970	468	−5.6%
1980	479	+2.4%
1991	438	−8.6%
2001	460	+5.0%
2011	481	+4.6%
2021	494	+2.7%
Source: Censuses
