= Pancarköy air disaster =

1981 military air disaster in Turkey

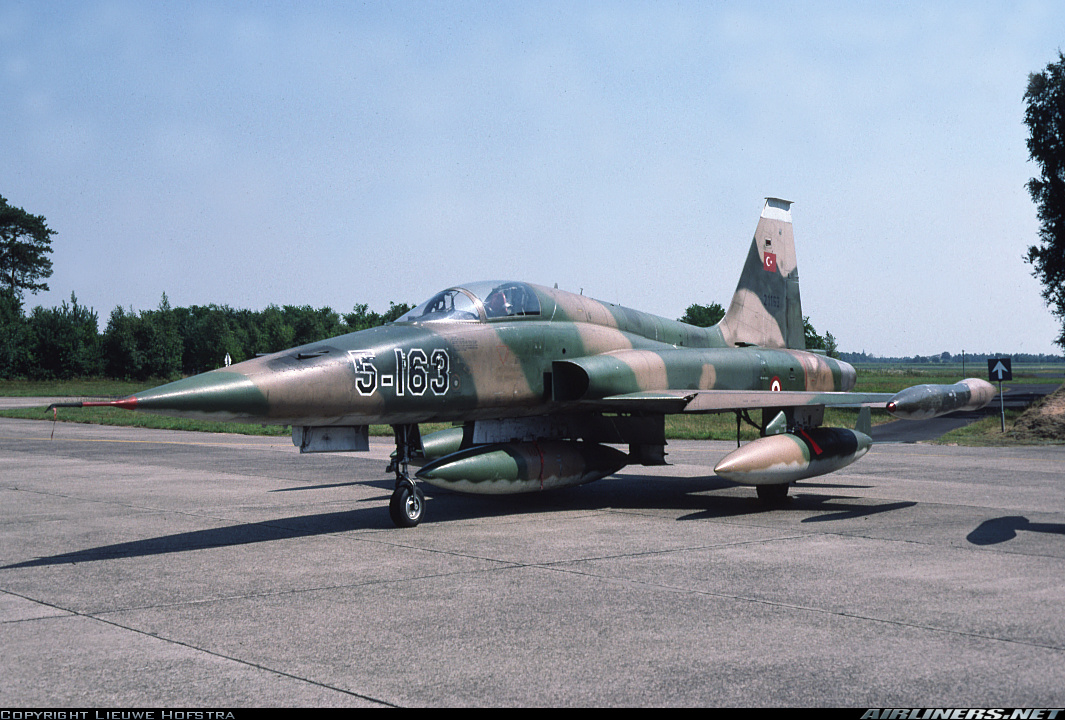
- A similar Turkish Air Force F-5A 64-13340

Accident
- Date: 22 September 1981
- Summary: Aircraft hit the hill due to pilot error and crashed into soldiers' military exercise site, Controlled Flight Into Terrain
- Site: Babaeski Kırklareli, Turkey; 41.3956°N 27.1267°E
- Total fatalities: 66
- Total injuries: 72

Aircraft
- Aircraft type: Northrop F-5
- Operator: Turkish Air Force
- Registration: 64-13340
- Flight origin: Babaeski, Kırklareli
- Destination: Babaeski, Kırklareli
- Occupants: 1
- Crew: 1
- Fatalities: 1
- Survivors: 0

Ground casualties
- Ground fatalities: 65
- Ground injuries: 72

In Babaeski, Kırklareli, on 22 September 1981, a Turkish Air Force Northrop F-5 crashed during a military exercise, killing 35 and injuring more than 72 soldiers. 31 more soldiers died later from their injuries. The crash is the worst military air disaster in Turkey's history as of September 2025.

== Event ==
On 22 September 1981 Turkish Armed Forces, were conducting a military exercise in Babaeski, Kırklareli, 2 kilometers away from the E-5 roadway.

While more than 100 soldiers were on ground, Pilot Lieutenant Mustafa Özcan was piloting a Northrop F-5. According to a surviving soldier, the jet hit a hill and crashed into the soldiers. 35 soldiers died and more than 70 were injured. 31 more passed away days later. A river near the exercise saved some soldiers from burning. Most of the soldiers' bodies were burnt badly. Eight of them could not be identified.

== Memorial ==
A memorial site was erected in early 2000. The soldiers that died have their graves there. Every year on September 22, a ceremony takes place on the memorial site.

== See also ==
- Ramstein air show disaster
- 1990 Italian Air Force MB-326 crash
