= Starwood (nightclub) =

Nightclub and music venue in California

- The Starwood entrance in early 1979
- Interactive map of Starwood
- Former names: P.J.'s (1961–1973)
- Address: 8151 Santa Monica Blvd; West Hollywood, CA 90046; United States
- Coordinates: 34.091028°N 118.366643°W
- Owner: Eddie Nash
- Capacity: 800 (500 seated); 400 standing at the Rock Room
- Type: Nightclub, music venue
- Event: Entertainment

Construction
- Opened: 1973
- Closed: June 13, 1981
- Years active: 8

The Starwood was a popular nightclub and music venue in West Hollywood, California, from early 1973 to 1981. Many punk bands and heavy metal bands, including Van Halen, started their careers playing at the club. The Starwood was located on the northwest corner of Santa Monica Blvd. and Crescent Heights Blvd.

== History ==
=== P.J.'s (1961–1973) ===
The Starwood was preceded by P.J.'s, a fashionable jazz and pop music nightclub during the 1960s, which attracted a large number of film and TV personalities, and some old school jazz musicians. Established in February 1961 by Paul Raffles, Chuck Murano, Bill Daugherty, and Elmer Valentine, it hosted such acts as the Bobby Fuller Four, the Standells, Rufus Thomas, Trini Lopez, and Kool & the Gang, all of whom recorded live albums there. Other notable performers at the venue were the Flying Burrito Brothers, and Tim Buckley. The club was managed by Valentine until he left to cofound the Whisky a Go Go in January 1964.

In late 1971, P.J.'s was bought by alleged organized crime figures Eddie Nash and Dominic Lucci, together with Hal Glickman. After receiving a light renovation, the club was reopened to the public in January 1972.

=== Starwood (1973–1981) ===
In 1973, after Nash bought out Lucci's and Glickman's ownership interests in the P.J.'s club, it became the Starwood, which was managed by Gary Fontenot until the club closed permanently on June 13, 1981, by order of the Los Angeles County authorities due to too many citations for underage drinking and noise abatement issues, among others. In May 1982, before its scheduled demolition, it caught fire, though not burning totally. The blaze occurred while unexplained fires befell other Nash-owned properties at the time. Subsequently, the structure was torn down, and a mini-mall replaced the nightclub.

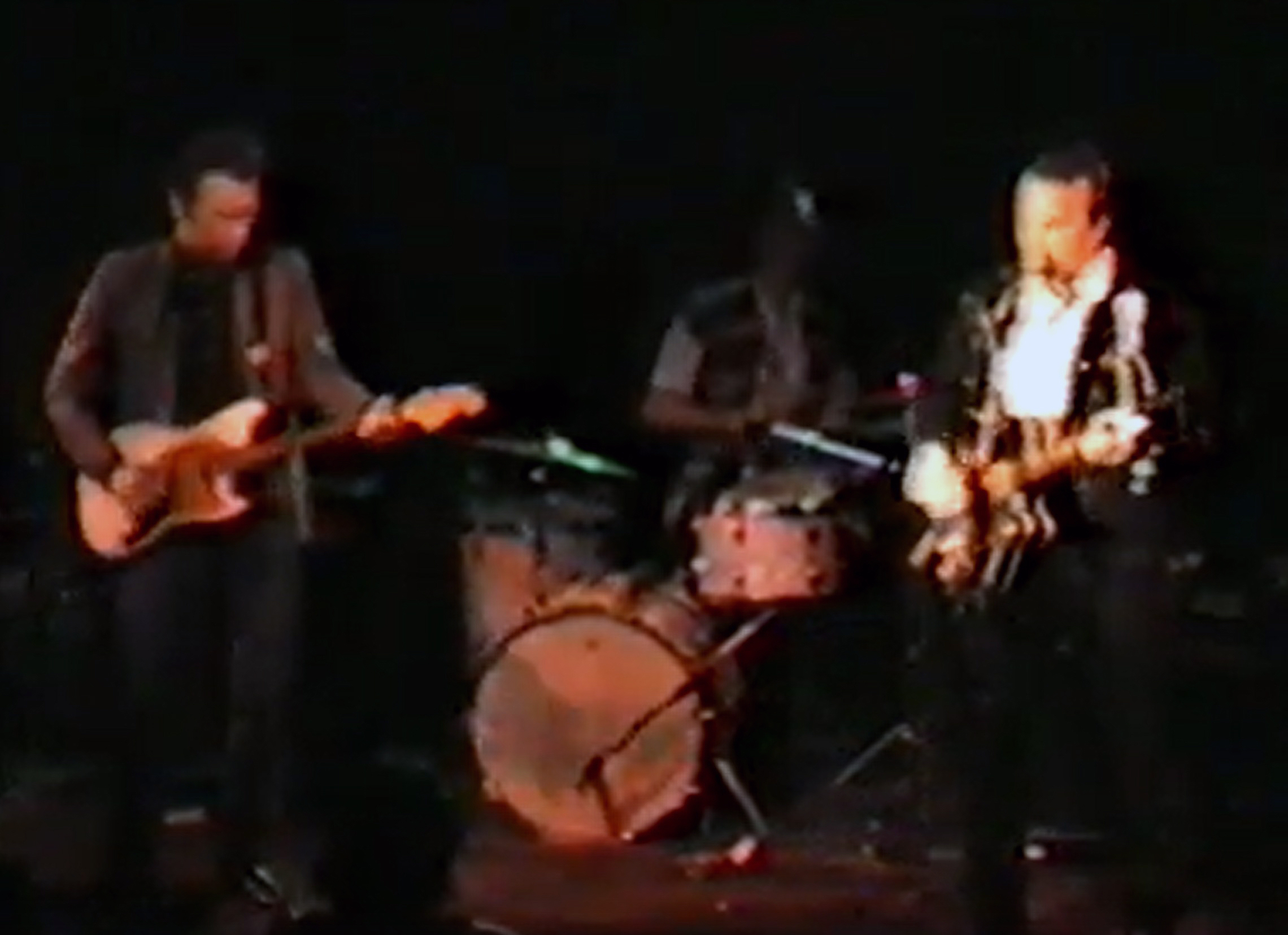
The Blasters with Phil and Dave Alvin at the Starwood, 1980

The Starwood hosted many regional bands and artists including Van Halen, X, the Germs (who played their legendary last show at the venue), the Go-Go's, Fear, Circle Jerks, the Knack, W.A.S.P. (known as Circus Circus at the time), the Motels, Quiet Riot, Dokken and the Runaways.

Ray Manzarek's short lived band Nite City appeared at the club and recorded their set for their live album Starwood Club, Los Angeles. 02/23/1977.

Mötley Crüe, one of the most successful bands to emerge from the Sunset Strip music scene, played their first concert together as a band at the Starwood on April 24, 1981, with help from the band's bass guitarist, Nikki Sixx, who was employed by the Starwood as a janitor and convinced his boss to let them play there, opening for the already established California-based band Y&T. Sixx had performed at the Starwood prior to forming Mötley Crüe with his former band, London. Also Tommy Lee had performed at the Starwood before Mötley Crüe with his band named Suite 19, where Nikki Sixx saw for the first time Tommy perform and liked his style.

Some of the acts from outside of California who played at the Starwood include Blue Öyster Cult (under the name Soft White Underbelly), Aerosmith (under the name Dr. J. Jones & the Interns), the Damned, Devo, the Jam, Cheap Trick, the Ramones, the Dead Boys, the Stranglers, AC/DC, Slade, Vince Vance & the Valiants, Rush, Rory Gallagher, UFO, the Fleshtones, and Judas Priest, who did three nights at the Starwood in 1978.

The Starwood had two rooms with a hallway between; one room was a small dance floor and the other was the concert venue. Paid admission allowed access to both rooms, although the concert side was always crowded. The venue was small, what is commonly known today as 'shoebox' size, and configured with a long stage.

== In popular culture ==
- The club is mentioned (along with Madame Wong's and the Whisky a Go Go) in the title track from Frank Zappa's 1981 album Tinsel Town Rebellion.
- The Starwood is mentioned in the Red Hot Chili Peppers songs "Deep Kick" from the 1995 album One Hot Minute and "Aquatic Mouth Dance" from Unlimited Love (2022).

== See also ==
- P.J.'s (in French)
