= Behind the Candelabra =

2013 film

- Television release poster
- Written by: Richard LaGravenese
- Directed by: Steven Soderbergh
- Starring: Michael Douglas; Matt Damon; Dan Aykroyd; Scott Bakula; Rob Lowe; Debbie Reynolds
- Music by: Marvin Hamlisch
- Country of origin: United States
- Original language: English

Production
- Executive producer: Jerry Weintraub
- Producers: Gregory Jacobs; Susan Ekins; Michael Polaire
- Cinematography: Peter Andrews
- Editor: Mary Ann Bernard
- Running time: 118 minutes
- Production companies: Jerry Weintraub Productions; HBO Films
- Budget: $23 million

Original release
- Network: HBO
- Release: May 26, 2013

Behind the Candelabra is a 2013 American biographical comedy drama television film directed by Steven Soderbergh and written by Richard LaGravenese, based on the 1988 book by Scott Thorson and Alex Thorleifson. It dramatizes the last ten years in the life of pianist Liberace and the relationship that he had with Thorson.

It premiered at the 2013 Cannes Film Festival on May 21, 2013, and competed for the Palme d'Or. It aired on HBO on May 26, 2013, and was given a cinematic release in the United Kingdom on June 7, 2013. The film received critical acclaim from television critics, including praise for the performances of Michael Douglas and Matt Damon. It marked the final onscreen acting role for Debbie Reynolds before her death in 2016.

== Plot ==
In 1977, 18-year-old Scott Thorson, who works as an animal trainer for films, meets Bob Black, a Hollywood producer, in a gay bar in Los Angeles. At Black's urging, he leaves his adopted home in search of better-paying work. Black introduces Thorson to Liberace, who takes an immediate liking to the handsome younger man. Liberace invites the two backstage and then to his luxurious home in Las Vegas.

Thorson observes that one of Liberace's beloved dogs has a temporary form of blindness, and with his veterinary assistant background, informs the famous pianist that he knows how to cure the condition. After treating the dog, Thorson becomes Liberace's "assistant" at the performer's request. Thorson also becomes employed as Liberace's stage chauffeur, driving a Rolls-Royce limousine onto the stage for Liberace's grand entrances.

Thorson moves in with Liberace and becomes his lover. At this point, Thorson says that he is bisexual because he is also attracted to women. Liberace is sympathetic, informing him that he wanted and tried to love women, but was exclusively attracted to men. A devout Catholic, he relates a story of a "divine healing" in which an angelic "messenger" dressed as a nun informed him that God still loved him.

It gradually becomes clear that Liberace is trying to mold Thorson into a younger version of himself. He asks his plastic surgeon, Dr. Jack Startz, to transform Scott's face to more closely resemble his own, and he even tries unsuccessfully to adopt him. Startz prescribes drugs for Thorson to help him lose weight, and Thorson soon turns to other drugs as he becomes angrier and more frustrated with Liberace's attempts to control him as well as Liberace's obsession with hiding their romance and homosexuality from the public.

By 1982, Thorson's increasing drug abuse and Liberace's interest in younger men, including dancer Cary James, creates a rift that ultimately destroys their relationship. Liberace begins visiting pornographic peep shows and suggests that they each see other people. Later, Thorson starts flying into jealous rages, whereupon Liberace kicks him out and ends their partnership.

Scott Thorson retains an attorney to seek his financial share by suing Liberace for over $100 million in palimony. In 1984, Thorson's palimony lawsuit starts in which he gives details about his romance for five years with the entertainer, while Liberace flatly denies any sexual relationship. Thorson settles for $75,000, three cars, and three pet dogs.

In December 1986, Thorson receives a telephone call from Liberace telling him that he is very ill with what is later revealed to be AIDS and that he would like Thorson to visit him again. Thorson agrees and drives to Liberace's retreat house in Palm Springs, where he and Liberace have one last, emotional conversation. Liberace dies a few months later in February 1987. Thorson attends Liberace's funeral, in which he imagines seeing Liberace performing one last time with his traditional flamboyance, before being lifted to Heaven with a stage harness.

== Cast ==
- Michael Douglas as Liberace
- Matt Damon as Scott Thorson
- Dan Aykroyd as Seymour Heller
- Rob Lowe as Dr. Jack Startz
- Debbie Reynolds as Frances Liberace
- Scott Bakula as Bob Black
- Boyd Holbrook as Cary James
- Tom Papa as Ray Arnett
- Nicky Katt as Mr. Y
- Cheyenne Jackson as Billy Leatherwood (based on Liberace's protégé Vince Cardell)
- Paul Reiser as Mr. Felder
- David Koechner as Adoption Attorney
- Peggy King as TV Vocalist (When Liberace Winks at Me)

== Production ==
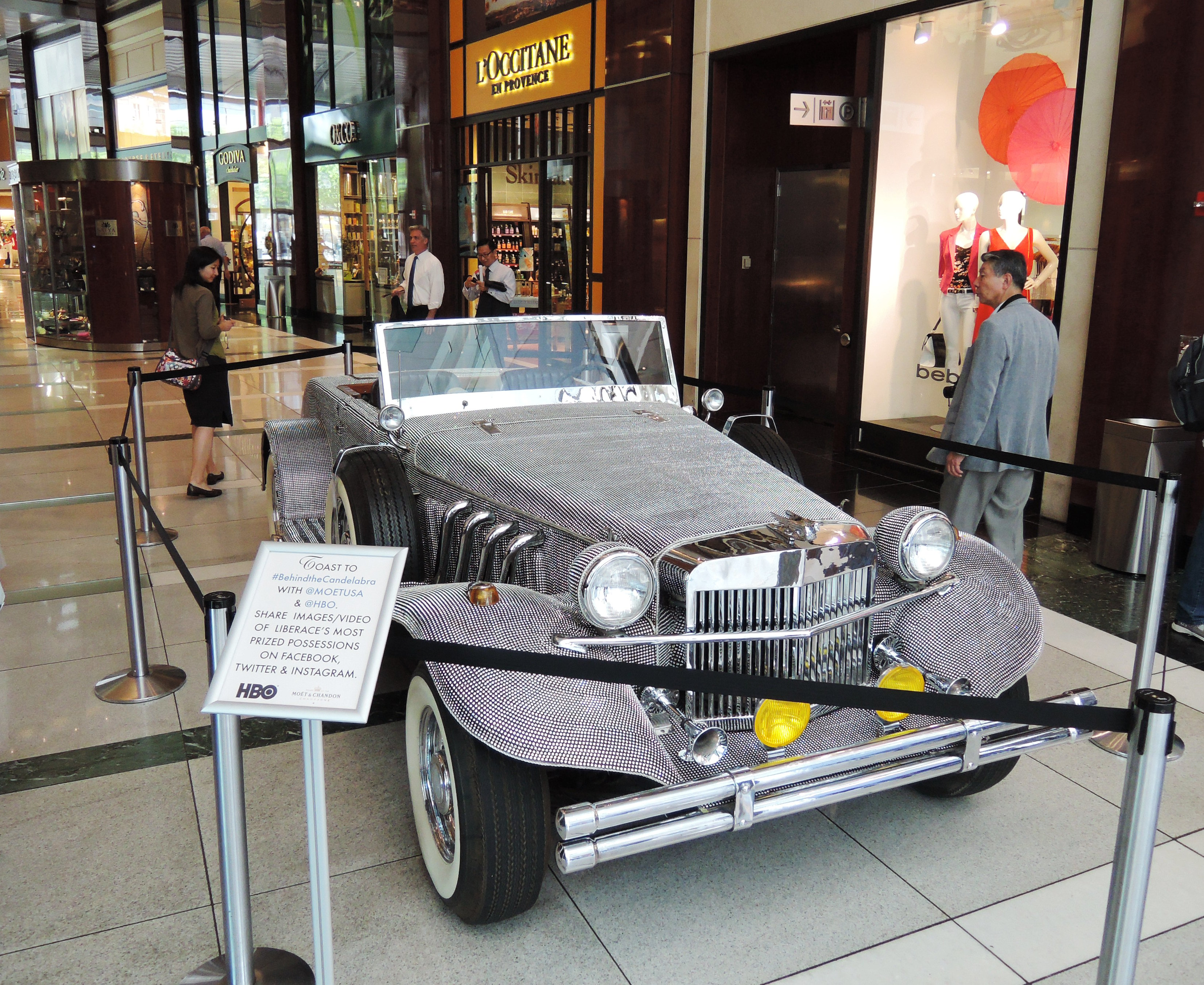
Liberace's rhinestone-studded Excalibur, which was used in the production

Development on a Liberace biopic first began in 1999 when it was reported producer Cary Woods had acquired a spec script by Jason Friedberg and Aaron Seltzer.

Director Steven Soderbergh first spoke with Michael Douglas about the idea of doing a Liberace film during the production of Traffic (2000), but had trouble figuring out an angle for it that would differentiate it from a traditional biopic. In the summer of 2008, Soderbergh contacted screenwriter Richard LaGravenese with the idea of adapting Scott Thorson's memoir Behind the Candelabra: My Life with Liberace. In September 2008, the project was officially announced with Matt Damon close to signing on to play Thorson and Douglas in talks to portray Liberace.

The following year, Douglas officially signed on to play Liberace alongside Damon. The film spent several years in development while Soderbergh had difficulty securing funding, with Hollywood studios saying it was "too gay". During this time, Douglas and Damon remained adamant that they would appear in the film despite its lengthy development. Ultimately, the film was picked up by HBO Films and shot on a budget of $23 million over thirty days in 2012.

While promoting the film, Soderbergh went on to explain that this would be his last directorial effort for the time being. It is also the last film to feature a musical score by composer Marvin Hamlisch, who died on August 6, 2012.

Scenes set in Las Vegas were filmed at Zsa Zsa Gabor's mansion in Bel Air (interior and some exterior shots) and Siegfried & Roy's mansion in Las Vegas (driveway); Liberace's West Hollywood penthouse had been converted into an office space after his death, but the building's owner convinced the current occupants to temporarily relocate during filming, and the space was returned to Liberace's original design. Performances were filmed at the Las Vegas Hilton, where Liberace once had a residency. Production designer was Howard Cummings, while set decorator was Barbara Munch Cameron.

The pianos used in the film were also once owned by Liberace; one of the pianos used in the opening scenes had been purchased by Debbie Gibson at the 1988 estate sale. Michael Douglas' head was digitally composited onto the body of Philip Fortenberry for the piano playing performances. Fortenberry, who had entertained audiences at the Liberace Museum, stated the rings needed to be glued to his fingers: "These rings kept flopping around and clicking on the keys."

== Reception ==
=== Critical response ===
The film received critical acclaim. Review aggregation website Rotten Tomatoes gives the film an approval rating of 94%, based on reviews from 106 film critics with an average score of 8.1 out of 10. The website's critical consensus reads: "Affectionate without sacrificing honesty, Behind the Candelabra couples award-worthy performances from Michael Douglas and Matt Damon with some typically sharp direction from Steven Soderbergh." Metacritic, which assigns a weighted average score out of 100 to reviews from mainstream critics, gives the film a score of 83 based on 30 reviews.

Peter Bradshaw of The Guardian gave the film four out of five stars, saying "As a black comedy, and as a portrait of celebrity loneliness, Behind the Candelabra is very stylish and effective, and Damon and Douglas give supremely entertaining performances."

=== Ratings ===
The film, shown for the first time on American television on May 26, 2013, was watched by 2.4 million US viewers. A further 1.1 million tuned in to watch the repeat immediately after, bringing viewership to 3.5 million in total. When the film debuted on HBO, it achieved the highest ratings for a television film since 2004.

=== Box office ===
The film grossed $13.3 million in the territories it was released theatrically.

== Accolades ==
Year	Award	Category	Nominee(s)	Result	Ref.
2013	Artios Awards	Outstanding Achievement in Casting – Television Movie/Mini Series	Carmen Cuba; Wittney Horton	Won	
2013	California on Location Awards	Independent Feature Film	Caleb Duffy	Won	
2013	Cannes Film Festival	Palme d'Or	Steven Soderbergh	Nominated	
2013	Cannes Film Festival	Queer Palm	Steven Soderbergh	Nominated	
2013	Cannes Film Festival	Palm Dog Award	Baby Boy	Won	
2013	Critics' Choice Television Awards	Best Movie/Miniseries		Won	
2013	Critics' Choice Television Awards	Best Actor in a Movie/Miniseries	Matt Damon	Nominated	
2013	Critics' Choice Television Awards	Best Actor in a Movie/Miniseries	Michael Douglas	Won	
2013	Dublin Film Critics' Circle Awards	Best Film		6th Place	
2013	Dublin Film Critics' Circle Awards	Best Director	Steven Soderbergh	4th Place	
2013	Dublin Film Critics' Circle Awards	Best Actor	Michael Douglas	3rd Place	
2013	Dublin Film Critics' Circle Awards	Best Screenplay	Richard LaGravenese	10th Place	
2013	Hollywood Post Alliance Awards	Outstanding Color Grading – Television	John Daro	Nominated	
2013	Primetime Emmy Awards	Outstanding Miniseries or Movie	Jerry Weintraub; Gregory Jacobs; Susan Ekins; Michael Polaire	Won	
2013	Primetime Emmy Awards	Outstanding Lead Actor in a Miniseries or Movie	Matt Damon	Nominated	
2013	Primetime Emmy Awards	Outstanding Lead Actor in a Miniseries or Movie	Michael Douglas	Won	
2013	Primetime Emmy Awards	Outstanding Supporting Actor in a Miniseries or Movie	Scott Bakula	Nominated	
2013	Primetime Emmy Awards	Outstanding Directing for a Miniseries, Movie or Dramatic Special	Steven Soderbergh	Won	
2013	Primetime Emmy Awards	Outstanding Writing for a Miniseries, Movie or Dramatic Special	Richard LaGravenese	Nominated	
2013	Primetime Creative Arts Emmy Awards	Outstanding Art Direction for a Miniseries or Movie	Howard Cummings; Patrick M. Sullivan Jr.; Barbara Munch	Won	
2013	Primetime Creative Arts Emmy Awards	Outstanding Casting for a Miniseries, Movie, or a Special	Carmen Cuba	Won	
2013	Primetime Creative Arts Emmy Awards	Outstanding Cinematography for a Miniseries or Movie	Steven Soderbergh (as Peter Andrews)	Nominated	
2013	Primetime Creative Arts Emmy Awards	Outstanding Costumes for a Miniseries, Movie or Special	Ellen Mirojnick; Robert Q. Matthews	Won	
2013	Primetime Creative Arts Emmy Awards	Outstanding Hairstyling for a Miniseries or Movie	Marie Larkin; Yvette Stone; Kerrie Smith; Kay Georgiou	Won	
2013	Primetime Creative Arts Emmy Awards	Outstanding Makeup for a Miniseries or a Movie (Non-Prosthetic)	Kate Biscoe; Deborah Rutherford; Deborah La Mia Denaver; Christine Beveridge; Todd Kleitsch	Won	
2013	Primetime Creative Arts Emmy Awards	Outstanding Prosthetic Makeup for a Series, Miniseries, Movie or a Special	Kate Biscoe; Hiroshi Yada; Jamie Kelman; Stephen Kelley; Chrissie Beveridge; Todd Kleitsch; Christien Tinsley	Won	
2013	Primetime Creative Arts Emmy Awards	Outstanding Single-Camera Picture Editing for a Miniseries or a Movie	Steven Soderbergh (as Mary Ann Bernard)	Won	
2013	Primetime Creative Arts Emmy Awards	Outstanding Sound Mixing for a Miniseries or a Movie	Dennis Towns; Larry Blake; Thomas Vicari	Won	
2013	Television Critics Association Awards	Outstanding Achievement in Movies, Miniseries and Specials		Won	
2014	American Cinema Editors Awards	Best Edited Miniseries or Motion Picture for Television	Steven Soderbergh (as Mary Ann Bernard)	Won	
2014	Art Directors Guild Awards	Excellence in Production Design Award – Television Movie or Mini-Series	Howard Cummings; Patrick M. Sullivan Jr.; Eric R. Johnson; Karen TenEyck; Thomas Machan; John Berger; Eric Sundahl; Greg Berry; Barbara Munch	Won	
2014	British Academy Film Awards	Best Actor in a Supporting Role	Matt Damon	Nominated	
2014	British Academy Film Awards	Best Adapted Screenplay	Richard LaGravenese	Nominated	
2014	British Academy Film Awards	Best Costume Design	Ellen Mirojnick	Nominated	
2014	British Academy Film Awards	Best Makeup and Hair	Kate Biscoe; Marie Larkin	Nominated	
2014	British Academy Film Awards	Best Production Design	Howard Cummings; Barbara Munch-Cameron	Nominated	
2014	Cinema Audio Society Awards	Outstanding Achievement in Sound Mixing for Television Movies and Mini-Series	Dennis Towns; Larry Blake; Thomas Vicari; Scott Curtis	Won	
2014	Costume Designers Guild Awards	Outstanding Made for Television Movie or Miniseries	Ellen Mirojnick	Won	
2014	Directors Guild of America Awards	Outstanding Directorial Achievement in Movies for Television and Miniseries	Steven Soderbergh	Won	
2014	Dorian Awards	TV Drama of the Year		Won (Note: Tied with Orange Is the New Black.)	
2014	Dorian Awards	TV Performance of the Year – Actor	Michael Douglas	Won	
2014	Dorian Awards	LGBT TV Show of the Year		Nominated	
2014	Dorian Awards	Campy TV Show of the Year		Nominated	
2014	GLAAD Media Awards	Outstanding TV Movie or Mini-Series		Won	
2014	Golden Globe Awards	Best Miniseries or Television Film		Won	
2014	Golden Globe Awards	Best Actor – Miniseries or Television Film	Matt Damon	Nominated	
2014	Golden Globe Awards	Best Actor – Miniseries or Television Film	Michael Douglas	Won	
2014	Golden Globe Awards	Best Supporting Actor – Series, Miniseries or Television Film	Rob Lowe	Nominated	
2014	Guild of Music Supervisors Awards	Best Music Supervision in Television Long Form and Movies	Evyen Klean	Won	
2014	Irish Film & Television Awards	International Actor	Michael Douglas	Nominated	
2014	Jupiter Awards	Best International Actor	Michael Douglas	Nominated	
2014	Location Managers Guild Awards	Outstanding Achievement by a Location Professional – TV Program	Caleb Duffy	Nominated	
2014	London Film Critics Circle Awards	Actor of the Year	Michael Douglas	Nominated	
2014	London Film Critics Circle Awards	Technical Achievement	Howard Cummings (production design)	Nominated	
2014	Make-Up Artists and Hair Stylists Guild Awards	Best Period and/or Character Hair Styling – Television Mini-Series or Motion Picture Made for Television	Marie Larkin; Yvette Stone	Won	
2014	Make-Up Artists and Hair Stylists Guild Awards	Best Period and/or Character Makeup – Television Mini-Series or Motion Picture Made for Television	Kate Biscoe; Deborah Rutherford	Won	
2014	People's Choice Awards	Favorite TV Movie/Miniseries		Nominated	
2014	Producers Guild of America Awards	David L. Wolper Award for Outstanding Producer of Long-Form Television	Susan Ekins; Gregory Jacobs; Michael Polaire; Jerry Weintraub	Won	
2014	Satellite Awards	Best Miniseries or Motion Picture Made for Television		Nominated	
2014	Satellite Awards	Best Actor in a Miniseries or a Motion Picture Made for Television	Matt Damon	Nominated	
2014	Satellite Awards	Best Actor in a Miniseries or a Motion Picture Made for Television	Michael Douglas	Won	
2014	Screen Actors Guild Awards	Outstanding Performance by a Male Actor in a Television Movie or Miniseries	Matt Damon	Nominated	
2014	Screen Actors Guild Awards	Outstanding Performance by a Male Actor in a Television Movie or Miniseries	Michael Douglas	Won	

== See also ==
- List of films set in Las Vegas
