= 1981 Polish hunger demonstrations =

Protests against the on-going economic crisis

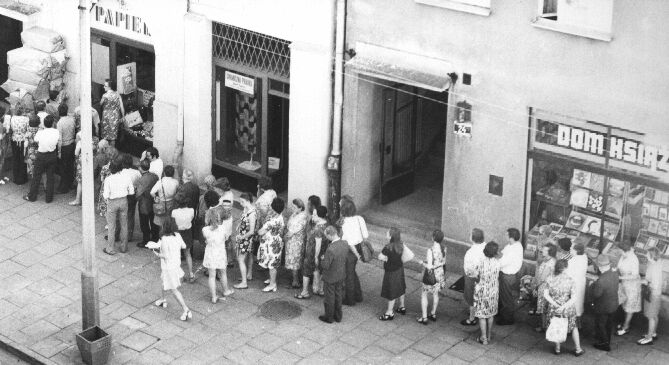
- Long queue to the paper shop to buy toilet paper
- Date: 1981
- Location: Polish People's Republic
- Type: Demonstrations
- Cause: Widespread economic crisis and food shortages

In mid-1981, amid a widespread economic crisis and food shortages in the Polish People's Republic, thousands of Poles, mainly women and their children, took part in several hunger demonstrations, organized in cities and towns across the country. The protests were peaceful, without rioting, and the biggest one took place on 30 July 1981 in Łódź. The situation in Communist Poland was serious enough that it prompted Adam Michnik to write, "Poland faces hunger uprisings".

== Background ==
The summer of 1981 was a very turbulent time in the Polish People's Republic. The creation of Solidarity, the first independent mass political movement in the Eastern Bloc, raised the hopes of millions of Poles, and in the mid-1980s, Solidarity was by far the biggest non-religious organization of the country, with around 10 million members. However, at the same time, the economic crisis was so serious and food shortages in Poland were so common, that in several cities the so-called hunger demonstrations (or hunger processions) took place. The biggest protests occurred in Łódź, the city which suffered in particular from meat shortages.

According to the Rzeczpospolita daily, the summer of 1981 was the "bottom of the crisis". Virtually all products were lacking, including meat, coffee, laundry detergents, sugar, and cigarettes. In Warsaw, buses of the public transit authority had no spare tires and the company announced that only main routes would be kept, adding that the public had to get used to a situation in which "there are shortages of meat, soap, cigarettes and of a decent transportation system". The situation was summarized by a grim Solidarity poster that appeared on Polish streets in early summer 1981. It showed a black skull with a crossed knife and fork under it. The first result of the ninth party congress: a cut in food rations, the poster said, referring to the 20 percent reduction in meat allotments.

According to the statistics, released at the end of July 1981, meat supplies had fallen 17% in the first six months of the year, and the government of Poland tried to control the situation by limiting meat allotments for the population of the country. It was announced, that starting in August 1981, some 16 million citizens would be able to purchase up to 3 kg (6.6 lb) of meats monthly, instead of 3.7 kg (8.2 lb) before (provided that there was any meat on the market). This announcement raised angry comments, Solidarity demanded control of food production, and there were rumors that the government was keeping meat away from the public. People were spending days, if not weeks, in lines to buy necessary products. In many cases, special Queue Social Committees were formed, which nominated the Head of the Queue – a person who drew up a list of those waiting, and at appointed times, checked the names. Those who did not show up lost their place in the line.

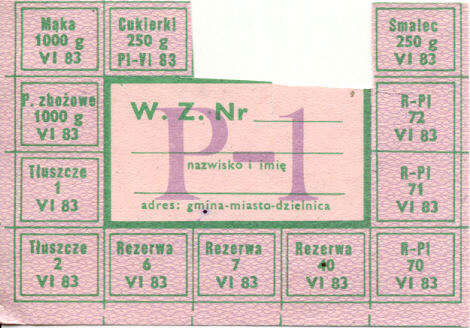
1980s Polish P-1 food ration card includes a monthly allotment of, among other items, meat, 250 g (8.8 oz) of candy, 1 kg (2.2 lb) of flour, 250 g (8.8 oz) of lard

== First demonstrations ==
The first recorded hunger demonstration took place on 25 July 1981, in the town centre Kutno, at a crucial railroad junction. Some 2,000 people participated in it, and it was the first street protest in Poland since August 1980, as Solidarity had previously been trying to limit its actions to factories. The demonstration in Kutno was organized by the local Solidarity office, Interfactory Founding Committee (Międzyzakładowy Komitet Założycielski). The demonstrators in Kutno carried banners proclaiming: We are tired of being hungry, We are tired of queueing, and We demand life on the level of a civilised country, carrying empty pots and pans.

In the following days, demonstrations were organized in numerous cities across whole countries, such as Częstochowa, Białystok, Tarnów, Tomaszów Mazowiecki, Olsztyn, Tarnowskie Góry, Konin, Kraków, Piotrków Trybunalski, Bełchatów (July 30, 3,000 participants), Pabianice, Szczecin (July 31, 5,000 participants), Kalisz, and a series of protests in Łódź, where the first demonstration took place on Monday, 27 July at 3 p.m. Banners, held by the residents of Łódź, stated among others: "Our children are hungry", "We stand in lines 24 hours a day", "We want to split bread, not Poland", "The hungry of all countries – unite!", and "We are not going to work hungry". In the following days, further demonstrations took place in Łódź – on 29 July, and on 30 July, when up to 50,000 people protested, blessed on the way by the Bishop of Łódź, Józef Rozwadowski. Most of participants were women and their children, with men walking on the sides and trying to protect the demonstrators. As Jacek Kuroń later said: "Those crowds wielding banners broke the principle of not leaving factories to take to the streets. They created an atmosphere of such tension that the government probably panicked".

== Demonstration in Łódź ==
The biggest demonstration took place in Łódź, on 30 July 1981, and was organized by a group of local Solidarity activists, such as Andrzej Slowik, Grzegorz Palka, Jerzy Kropiwnicki and Janina Kończak. Łódź was the city in which food shortages were common and chronic. In mid-1981, the only rationed foodstuffs still available there were butter and flour.

It has been estimated that between 30,000 and 50,000 women and children marched on that day along Łódź's main artery, Piotrkowska Street. A reporter of the Życie Warszawy daily described the black procession in Łódź as "Something sublime, yet at the same time depressing. The demonstration takes place in silence, with a feeling of mourning. Most participants are women of different ages, who sing hymns, such as "Boże, coś Polskę" or patriotic songs, including "Rota". The banners read: We want to eat, The hungry of all countries – unite, Our children are hungry, We have no strength to work.

James M. Markham of The New York Times wrote on 30 July 1981: "As planned, policemen halted cross traffic along the route of two and a half miles as the angry placards were borne toward City Hall. They proclaimed: Bread, Hunger, Who Wants to Starve Us? We Are Hungry, The Hungry Will Eat the Authorities and Enough of Lying Explanations. The biggest applause was for the last placard in the procession: How Do You Eat Ration Coupons? With a Knife and Fork? Knots of people broke into applause, holding their hands above their heads. A few older people cried".

Jerzy Kropiwnicki of Łódź's office of Solidarity was one of the main organizers of the protests. This is his recollection of the demonstration:

"In those years, Łódź became famous in Poland with the so-called hunger march, frequently shown on public TV during the Martial law. The communist propaganda was trying to convince the Poles that food shortages were directly connected with strikes. However, back in mid-1981, when the situation in Łódź became tragic and there was no guarantee for one to purchase a piece of cheese or a fish, we realized that we could not control the workers any longer. Therefore, instead of another strike, we organized a street protest. It all began with a demonstration of vehicles belonging to the Państwowa Komunikacja Samochodowa (Motor Transport Company) and several construction companies, which blocked the center of the city. A few days later, along Piotrkowska Street, the biggest demonstration in the history of Łódź started. Some estimates claim that there were 50,000 participants, even though we wanted women only to take part in it. The men walked on the sides, and the handicapped were in front".
