= James Cox (director) =

American film director (born 1975)

- Born: February 5, 1975 (age 51); United States
- Occupation: Film director
- Website: jamescoxbooks.com

James Cox (born February 5, 1975) is an American film director. His short film Atomic Tabasco (which he made while a student at New York University) received an honorable mention at the 1999 Sundance Film Festival and a Bronze Medal at the 1999 Student Academy Awards. Cox then directed Highway in 2002 and Wonderland in 2003.

In 2013, his film Straight A's, starring Anna Paquin, Ryan Phillippe and Luke Wilson, received a theatrical release in the Netherlands. Cox has also directed music videos for Rise Against's "Give It All" and t.A.T.u.'s "All About Us", "White Robe" and "Friend or Foe".

In 2015, it was announced that Cox would be directing Taron Egerton, starring opposite Ansel Elgort and Kevin Spacey in a remake of Billionaire Boys Club. Despite accusations of sexual assault made against Spacey, the film was released on video on demand on July 17, 2018.

== Filmography ==
| Year | Title | Director | Writer | Notes |
|---|---|---|---|---|
| 1999 | Atomic Tabasco | Yes | Yes | Short film |
| 1999 | The Rock Star | Yes | Yes | Short film |
| 2002 | Highway | Yes | No | Debut film |
| 2003 | Wonderland | Yes | Yes | |
| 2013 | Straight A's | Yes | No | |
| 2018 | Billionaire Boys Club | Yes | Yes | |
