= MTV Asia Award for Favorite Artist Mainland China =

The following is a list of MTV Asia Awards winners for Favorite Artist Mainland China.

Year	Artist
2008	Li Yuchun
2006	Zhao Wei
2005	Sun Yue
2004	Pu Shu
2003	Yu Quan
2002	Na Ying
