= MTV Europe Music Award for Best Southeast Asian Act =

Category of MTV Europe Music Awards

The following is a list of the MTV Europe Music Award winners and nominees for Best Southeast Asian Act.

== Winners and nominees ==
=== 2010s ===
Year	Artist	Nationality	Ref
2013
2013	Mỹ Tâm	Vietnam	
2013	Hafiz	Malaysia	
2013	Noah	Indonesia	
2013	Olivia Ong	Singapore	
2013	Sarah Geronimo	Philippines	
2013	Slot Machine	Thailand	
2014
2014	Sarah Geronimo	Philippines	
2014	Noah	Indonesia	
2014	Stefanie Sun	Singapore	
2014	Yuna	Malaysia	
2014	Slot Machine	Thailand	
2014	Hồ Ngọc Hà	Vietnam	
2014	Agnez Mo	Indonesia	
2014	Pre-nominations: Afgan; Joe Flizzow; Up Dharma Down; The Sam Willows; Stamp Apiwat		
2015
2015	Sơn Tùng M-TP	Vietnam	
2015	Faizal Tahir	Malaysia	
2015	James Reid	Philippines	
2015	Nadine Lustre	Philippines	
2015	Noah	Indonesia	
2015	Slot Machine	Thailand	
2015	The Sam Willows	Singapore	
2015	Pre-nominations: Afgan; Joe Flizzow; James Reid; Nadine Lustre; The Sam Willows; Stamp Apiwat		
2016
2016	Đông Nhi	Vietnam	
2016	Bunkface	Malaysia	
2016	Gentle Bones	Singapore	
2016	Raisa	Indonesia	
2016	Sarah Geronimo	Philippines	
2016	Thaitanium	Thailand	
2016	Yuna	Malaysia	
2016	Pre-nominations: Donnalyn Bartolome; The Sam Willows; Shae; Tor		
2017
2017	James Reid	Philippines	
2017	Faizal Tahir	Malaysia	
2017	Đàm Vĩnh Hưng	Vietnam	
2017	Isyana Sarasvati	Indonesia	
2017	Palitchoke Ayanaputra	Thailand	
2017	Slot Machine	Thailand	
2017	The Sam Willows	Singapore	
2017	Pre-nominations: Ayda Jebat; The Ransom Collective; Sezairi		
2018
2018	Joe Flizzow	Malaysia	
2018	Afgan	Indonesia	
2018	The Sam Willows	Singapore	
2018	Slot Machine	Thailand	
2018	Minh Hang	Vietnam	
2018	IV of Spades	Philippines	
2018	Twopee Southside	Thailand	
2018	Pre-nominations: Gamaliel Audrey Cantika; Ismail Izzani; Yung Raja		
2019
2019	Jasmine Sokko	Singapore	
2019	Jannine Weigel	Thailand	
2019	Jasmine Sokko	Singapore	
2019	Moira Dela Torre	Philippines	
2019	Rich Brian	Indonesia	
2019	Suboi	Vietnam	
2019	Yuna	Malaysia	

=== 2020s ===
Year	Artist	Nationality	Ref
2020
2020	Jack (J97)	Vietnam	
2020	Agnez Mo	Indonesia	
2020	Benjamin Kheng	Singapore	
2020	Ben&Ben	Philippines	
2020	K-Clique	Malaysia	
2020	Violette Wautier	Thailand	
2021
2021	JJ Lin	Singapore	
2021	Ink Warunton	Thailand	
2021	K-ICM	Vietnam	
2021	Lyodra Ginting	Indonesia	
2021	Naim Daniel	Malaysia	
2021	SB19	Philippines	

== See also ==
- MTV Asia Awards:
  - MTV Asia Award for Favorite Artist Indonesia
  - MTV Asia Award for Favorite Artist Malaysia
  - MTV Asia Award for Favorite Artist Philippines
  - MTV Asia Award for Favorite Artist Singapore
  - MTV Asia Award for Favorite Artist Thailand
