= MTV Asia Award for Favorite Artist Korea =

The following is a list of MTV Asia Awards winners for Favorite Artist Korea.

Year	Artist	Ref.
2008	Super Junior	
2006	Seven	
2005	Rain	
2004	BoA	
2003	JtL	
2002	Kangta	
