= MTV Asia Award for Favorite Artist Hong Kong =

The following is a list of MTV Asia Awards winners for Favorite Artist Hong Kong.

Year	Artist	Ref.
2008	Leo Ku	
2006	Twins	
2005	Joey Yung	
2004	Sammi Cheng	
2003	Sammi Cheng	
2002	Sammi Cheng	
