= MTV Asia Award for Favorite Video =

The following is a list of MTV Asia Awards winners for Favorite Video/Video Star.

| Year | Artist | Video | Ref. |
|---|---|---|---|
| 2008 | Thirty Seconds to Mars | "A Beautiful Lie" | |
| 2006 | Korn | "Twisted Transistor" | |
| 2005 | Maroon 5 | "She Will Be Loved" | |
| 2004 | Linkin Park | "Somewhere I Belong" | |
| 2003 | Linkin Park | "Pts.OF.Athrty" | |
| 2002 | Backstreet Boys | "The Call" | |
