= List of awards and nominations received by Eminem =

Eminem awards and nominations
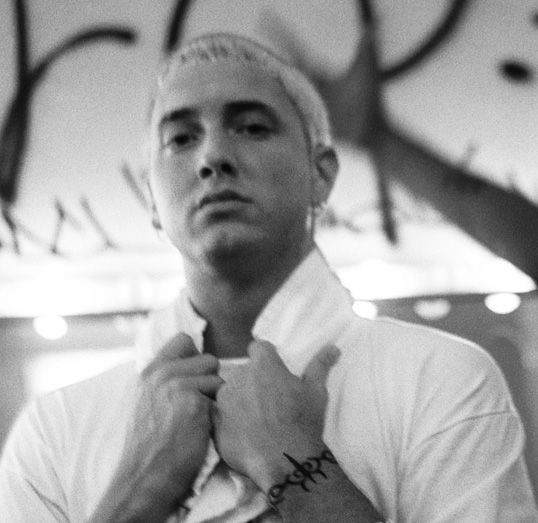
- Eminem in 1999
Awards and nominations
Award	Wins	Nominations
American Music Awards	10	27
Billboard	17	31
Brit	4	11
Golden Globe	0	1
Grammy	15	47
MTV Europe	15	33
MTV VMA	15	68
People's Choice	7	10
Teen Choice	11	27
World Music	8	9
Academy Awards	1	1
Emmy Awards	1	1
MTV Movie & TV Awards	2	2

Totals (Note: Certain award groups do not simply award one winner. They acknowledge several different recipients, have runners-up, and have third place. Since this is a specific recognition and is different from losing an award, runner-up mentions are considered wins in this award tally. For simplification and to avoid errors, each award in this list has been presumed to have had a prior nomination.)
- Wins: 151
- Nominations: 391

Eminem is an American rapper, songwriter, and record producer. He began his career in 1996 with Web Entertainment and has been one of the most popular rap acts in the world since the late 1990s. Eminem is the best-selling artist of the decade on the US Nielsen SoundScan and has sold over 220 million records worldwide, making him one of the best-selling music artists of all time.

Eminem quickly gained popularity in 1999 with his first studio album The Slim Shady LP, which won a Grammy Award for Best Rap Album. The following album, The Marshall Mathers LP, became the fastest-selling solo album in United States history.

The Marshall Mathers LP and his third studio album, The Eminem Show, won Grammy Awards, making Eminem the first artist to win Best Rap Album for three consecutive albums. He then won the award again in 2010 for his album Recovery, giving him a total of 15 Grammys in his career. In 2003, he won the Academy Award for Best Original Song and was nominated for a Golden Globe Award for Best Original Song for "Lose Yourself" from the film 8 Mile, in which he also played the lead role. "Lose Yourself" would go on to become the longest-running No. 1 hip hop single.

Eminem then went on hiatus after touring in 2005. He released his first album since 2004's Encore, titled Relapse, in May 2009. In 2010, he released his seventh album, Recovery. It became his sixth consecutive number-one album in the US and achieved international commercial success, topping the chart in several other countries. It stayed at number one on the US Billboard 200 chart for five consecutive weeks and a total of seven weeks. Recovery was also reported by Billboard to be the best-selling album of 2010, making Eminem the first artist in Nielsen SoundScan history to have two year-end best-selling albums.

Eminem was ranked 79th on the VH1 100 Greatest Artists of All Time. He was ranked 83rd on Rolling Stone magazine's list of the 100 Greatest Artists of All Time. He was also named the Best Rapper Alive by Vibe in 2008. Including his work with D12 and Bad Meets Evil, Eminem has had 13 number-one albums on the Billboard Top 200, ten solo, two with D12, and one with Bad Meets Evil. In December 2009, he was named the Artist of the Decade by Billboard. His albums, The Eminem Show, The Marshall Mathers LP, and Encore, ranked as the 3rd, 7th, and 40th best-selling albums of the 2000–09 decade by Billboard magazine. According to Billboard, Eminem has two of his albums among the top five highest selling albums of the 2000s decade. In the UK, Eminem has sold more than 13 million records. In 2010, MTV ranked Eminem as the 10th-biggest icon in pop music history. During 2010, Eminem's music generated 94 million streams, more than any other music artist.

In November at the 2013 MTV Europe Music Awards, Eminem became the first rapper to ever receive the global icon award due to his accomplishments and influences in music joining him with Queen, Whitney Houston and Bon Jovi.

As of early 2014, Eminem has sold more than 44 million track downloads and 44.91 million albums in the United States alone and became the second-best male selling artist in US history behind Garth Brooks.

For the decade of 2010 through 2019 Eminem was Spotify's fifth-most-streamed artist (most-streamed male artist).

In 2022, Eminem was inducted into the Rock and Roll Hall of Fame.

== Awards and nominations ==
Award	Year (Note: Indicates the year of ceremony. Each year is linked to the article about the awards held that year, wherever possible.)	Recipient(s) and nominee(s)	Category	Result	Ref.
Academy Award	2003	"Lose Yourself" (from 8 Mile)	Best Original Song	Won	
American Music Awards	2001	Eminem	Artist of the Year	Nominated	
American Music Awards	2001	Eminem	Favorite Pop/Rock Male Artist	Nominated	
American Music Awards	2001	Eminem	Favorite Rap/Hip-Hop Male Artist	Nominated	
American Music Awards	2003	Eminem	Fan Choice	Nominated	
American Music Awards	2003	Eminem	Favorite Hip-Hop/R&B Male Artist	Won	
American Music Awards	2003	Eminem	Favorite Pop/Rock Male Artist	Won	
American Music Awards	2003	The Eminem Show	Favorite Hip-Hop/R&B Album	Won	
American Music Awards	2003	The Eminem Show	Favorite Pop/Rock Album	Won	
American Music Awards	2003	Eminem	Favorite Rap/Hip-Hop Male Artist	Nominated	
American Music Awards	2003	8 Mile	Favorite Rap/Hip-Hop Album	Nominated	
American Music Awards	2005	Encore	Favorite Rap/Hip-Hop Album	Nominated	
American Music Awards	2005	Eminem	Favorite Rap/Hip-Hop Male Artist	Won	
American Music Awards	2006	Eminem	Favorite Rap/Hip-Hop Male Artist	Won	
American Music Awards	2006	Curtain Call: The Hits	Favorite Rap/Hip-Hop Album	Nominated	
American Music Awards	2009	Relapse	Favorite Rap/Hip-Hop Album	Nominated	
American Music Awards	2009	Eminem	Artist of the Year	Nominated	
American Music Awards	2009	Eminem	Favorite Pop/Rock Male Artist	Nominated	
American Music Awards	2009	Eminem	Favorite Rap/Hip-Hop Male Artist	Nominated	
American Music Awards	2010	Eminem	Favorite Rap/Hip-Hop Male Artist	Won	
American Music Awards	2010	Eminem	Artist of the Year	Nominated	
American Music Awards	2010	Eminem	Favorite Pop/Rock Male Artist	Nominated	
American Music Awards	2010	Recovery	Favorite Pop/Rock Album	Nominated	
American Music Awards	2010	Recovery	Favorite Rap/Hip-Hop Album	Won	
American Music Awards	2014	The Marshall Mathers LP 2	Favorite Rap/Hip-Hop Album	Nominated	
American Music Awards	2014	Eminem	Favorite Rap/Hip-Hop Artist	Nominated	
American Music Awards	2025	The Death of Slim Shady (Coup De Grâce)	Favorite Rap/Hip-Hop Album	Won	
American Music Awards	2025	Eminem	Favorite Rap/Hip-Hop Artist	Won	
ARIA Music Awards	2014	Eminem	Best International Artist	Nominated	
ARIA Music Awards	2018	Eminem	Best International Artist	Nominated	
ARIA Music Awards	2020	Eminem	Best International Artist	Nominated	
Barbados Music Awards	2011	"Love the Way You Lie" (featuring Rihanna)	Best Collaboration	Won	
BET Awards	2001	"Stan" (featuring Dido)	Video of the Year	Nominated	
BET Awards	2003	"Lose Yourself"	Video of the Year	Nominated	
BET Awards	2003	Eminem	Best Male Hip-Hop Artist	Nominated	
BET Awards	2010	"Forever" (with Drake, Kanye West and Lil Wayne)	Best Collaboration	Nominated	
BET Awards	2012	Bad Meets Evil	Best Group	Nominated	
BET Hip Hop Awards	2009	"We Made You"	Best Hip Hop Video	Nominated	
BET Hip Hop Awards	2009	Relapse	CD of the Year	Nominated	
BET Hip Hop Awards	2009	Eminem	Lyricist of the Year	Nominated	
BET Hip Hop Awards	2010	Eminem	Lyricist of the Year	Won	
BET Hip Hop Awards	2010	Eminem	MVP of the Year	Nominated	
BET Hip Hop Awards	2010	"Forever" (with Drake, Lil Wayne and Kanye West)	Reese's Perfect Combo Award	Nominated	
BET Hip Hop Awards	2010	"Not Afraid"	Verizon People's Champ Award	Nominated	
BET Hip Hop Awards	2010	Recovery	CD of the Year	Nominated	
BET Hip Hop Awards	2011	"Love The Way You Lie" (featuring Rihanna)	Best Hip-Hop Video	Nominated	
BET Hip Hop Awards	2014	Eminem	Lyricist of the Year	Nominated	
BET Hip Hop Awards	2014	"The Monster" (featuring Rihanna)	Best Collabo, Duo or Group	Nominated	
BET Hip Hop Awards	2014	The Marshall Mathers LP 2	Album of the Year	Nominated	
Billboard Music Awards	2000	"The Real Slim Shady"	Maximum Vision Video	Won	
Billboard Music Awards	2000	"The Real Slim Shady"	Best Rap/Hip-Hop Clip of the Year	Won	
Billboard Music Awards	2002	The Eminem Show	Album of the Year	Won	
Billboard Music Awards	2002	The Eminem Show	R&B/Hip-Hop Album of the Year	Won	
Billboard Music Awards	2002	The Eminem Show	Top 200 Billboard Album	Won	
Billboard Music Awards	2009	Eminem	Artist of the Decade	Won	
Billboard Music Awards	2010	Eminem	Male Artist of the Year	Won	
Billboard Music Awards	2011	Eminem	Top Artist	Won	
Billboard Music Awards	2011	Eminem	Top Billboard 200 Artist	Nominated	
Billboard Music Awards	2011	Eminem	Top Digital Media Artist	Nominated	
Billboard Music Awards	2011	Eminem	Top Digital Songs Artist	Nominated	
Billboard Music Awards	2011	Eminem	Top Male Artist	Won	
Billboard Music Awards	2011	Eminem	Top Rap Artist	Won	
Billboard Music Awards	2011	Eminem	Top Social Artist	Nominated	
Billboard Music Awards	2011	Eminem	Top Streaming Artist	Won	
Billboard Music Awards	2011	Recovery	Top Billboard 200 Album	Won	
Billboard Music Awards	2011	Recovery	Top Rap Album	Won	
Billboard Music Awards	2011	"Not Afraid"	Top Streaming Song (Video)	Nominated	
Billboard Music Awards	2011	"Love the Way You Lie" (featuring Rihanna)	Top Digital Song	Nominated	
Billboard Music Awards	2011	"Love the Way You Lie" (featuring Rihanna)	Top Hot 100 Song	Nominated	
Billboard Music Awards	2011	"Love the Way You Lie" (featuring Rihanna)	Top Radio Song	Nominated	
Billboard Music Awards	2011	"Love the Way You Lie" (featuring Rihanna)	Top Rap Song	Won	
Billboard Music Awards	2011	"Love the Way You Lie" (featuring Rihanna)	Top Streaming Song (Audio)	Nominated	
Billboard Music Awards	2011	"Love the Way You Lie" (featuring Rihanna)	Top Streaming Song (Video)	Nominated	
Billboard Music Awards	2011	Bad Meets Evil	Top Social Artist	Won	
Billboard Music Awards	2011	Bad Meets Evil	Top Billboard 200 Artist	Nominated	
Billboard Music Awards	2014	Eminem	Top Billboard 200 Artist	Nominated	
Billboard Music Awards	2014	Eminem	Top Male Artist	Nominated	
Billboard Music Awards	2014	Eminem	Top Rap Artist	Won	
Billboard Music Awards	2014	The Marshall Mathers LP 2	Top Billboard 200 Album	Nominated	
Billboard Music Awards	2014	The Marshall Mathers LP 2	Top Rap Album	Won	
Black Reel Awards	2003	8 Mile	Best Film Soundtrack	Nominated	
Black Reel Awards	2004	Tupac: Resurrection	Best Song	Nominated	
Blockbuster Entertainment Awards	2000	Eminem	Favorite New Male Artist	Won	
Blockbuster Entertainment Awards	2001	Eminem	Favorite Male Artist	Won	
Blockbuster Entertainment Awards	2001	Eminem	Favorite Rap Artist	Won	
Blockbuster Entertainment Awards	2001	The Marshall Mathers LP	Favorite CD	Nominated	
BMI Film/TV Awards	2003	"Lose Yourself"	Best Music	Won	
BMI Film/TV Awards	2003	"Lose Yourself"	Most Performed Song From A Film	Won	
BMI Pop Awards	2011	"Love the Way You Lie" (featuring Rihanna)	Award-Winning Songs	Won	
BMI Pop Awards	2015	"The Monster" (featuring Rihanna)	Award-Winning Songs	Won	
BMI R&B/Hip-Hop Awards	2014	"The Monster" (featuring Rihanna)	Most Performed Songs	Won	
BMI Urban Awards	2011	"Love the Way You Lie" (featuring Rihanna)	Award-Winning Songs	Won	
BMI Urban Awards	2011	"Not Afraid"	Award-Winning Songs	Won	
Brit Awards	2000	Eminem	International Breakthrough Act	Nominated	
Brit Awards	2000	Eminem	International Male Solo Artist	Nominated	
Brit Awards	2001	Eminem	International Male Solo Artist	Won	
Brit Awards	2003	Eminem	International Male Solo Artist	Won	
Brit Awards	2003	The Eminem Show	International Album	Won	
Brit Awards	2005	Eminem	International Male Solo Artist	Won	
Brit Awards	2010	Eminem	International Male Solo Artist	Nominated	
Brit Awards	2011	Eminem	International Male Solo Artist	Nominated	
Brit Awards	2011	Recovery	International Album	Nominated	
Brit Awards	2014	Eminem	International Male Solo Artist	Nominated	
Brit Awards	2019	Eminem	International Male Solo Artist	Nominated	
Chicago Film Critics Association Awards	2003	8 Mile	Most Promising Performer	Nominated	
Detroit Music Awards	2001	"The Real Slim Shady"	Outstanding National Single	Won	
Detroit Music Awards	2001	The Marshall Mathers LP	Outstanding National Album	Won	
Detroit Music Awards	2003	The Eminem Show	Outstanding National Album	Nominated	
Detroit Music Awards	2003	8 Mile	Outstanding National Album	Nominated	
Detroit Music Awards	2003	"Lose Yourself"	Outstanding National Single	Won	
Detroit Music Awards	2003	"Without Me"	Outstanding National Single	Nominated	
Detroit Music Awards	2005	Encore	Outstanding National Major Label Recording	Won	
Detroit Music Awards	2006	Curtain Call: The Hits	Outstanding Anthology/Compilation/Reissue	Won	
Detroit Music Awards	2011	Recovery	Outstanding National Major Label Recording	Won	
Detroit Music Awards	2011	"Not Afraid"	Outstanding National Single	Won	
Detroit Music Awards	2011	"Love the Way You Lie" (featuring Rihanna)	Outstanding National Single	Nominated	
Detroit Music Awards	2011	"Love the Way You Lie" (featuring Rihanna)	Outstanding Video / Major Budget (Over $10,000)	Nominated	
Detroit Music Awards	2011	"Not Afraid"	Outstanding Video / Major Budget (Over $10,000)	Won	
Detroit Music Awards	2014	"Berzerk"	Outstanding Video / Major Budget (Over $10,000)	Won	
Detroit Music Awards	2014	"Rap God"	Outstanding Video / Major Budget (Over $10,000)	Nominated	
Detroit Music Awards	2014	"Rap God"	Outstanding National Single	Nominated	
Detroit Music Awards	2014	The Marshall Mathers LP 2	Outstanding National Major Label Recording	Won	
Detroit Music Awards	2017	"Campaign Speech"	Outstanding National Single	Nominated	
Detroit Music Awards	2018	"Walk on Water"	Outstanding National Single	Nominated	
Detroit Music Awards	2018	"Walk on Water"	Outstanding Video / Major Budget (Over $10,000)	Nominated	
Detroit Music Awards	2018	Revival	Outstanding National Major Label Recording	Nominated	
Detroit Music Awards	2019	Kamikaze	Outstanding National Major Label Recording	Nominated	
Detroit Music Awards	2019	"Fall"	Outstanding Video / Major Budget (Over $10,000)	Nominated	
Detroit Music Awards	2021	Music to Be Murdered By	Outstanding National Major Label Recording	Won	
ECHO Awards	2001	Marshall Mathers LP	Best Hip-Hop/Urban Artist (International)	Won	
ECHO Awards	2002	Devil's Night (D12)	Best Hip-Hop/Urban Artist (International)	Won	
ECHO Awards	2003	The Eminem Show	Best Hip-Hop/Urban Artist (International)	Won	
ECHO Awards	2005	Encore	Best Hip-Hop/Urban Artist (International)	Won	
ECHO Awards	2007	Curtain Call: The Hits	Best Hip-Hop/Urban Artist (International)	Won	
ECHO Awards	2010	Relapse	Best Hip-Hop/Urban Artist (International)	Nominated	
ECHO Awards	2011	Recovery	Best Hip-Hop/Urban Artist (International)	Won	
ECHO Awards	2014	The Marshall Mathers LP 2	Best Hip-Hop/Urban Artist (International)	Won	
ECHO Awards	2018	Revival	Best International Male Artist	Nominated	
GAFFA Awards (Denmark)	1999	Eminem	Best Foreign New Act	Nominated	
GAFFA Awards (Denmark)	2002	Eminem	Best Foreign Male Act	Nominated	
GAFFA Awards (Denmark)	2019	Eminem	Best Foreign Artist	Nominated	
GAFFA Awards (Denmark)	2019	"River"	Best Foreign Song	Nominated	
GAFFA Awards (Denmark)	2019	Kamikaze	Best Foreign Album	Nominated	
GAFFA Awards (Sweden)	2010	"Love the Way You Lie" (featuring Rihanna)	Best Foreign Song	Won	
GAFFA Awards (Sweden)	2019	"River"	Best Foreign Song	Nominated	
Grammy Awards	2000	"My Name Is"	Best Rap Solo Performance	Won	
Grammy Awards	2000	"Guilty Conscience" (featuring Dr. Dre)	Best Rap Performance by a Duo or Group	Nominated	
Grammy Awards	2000	The Slim Shady LP	Best Rap Album	Won	
Grammy Awards	2001	"The Real Slim Shady"	Best Rap Solo Performance	Won	
Grammy Awards	2001	"Forgot About Dre" (with Dr. Dre)	Best Rap Performance by a Duo or Group	Won	
Grammy Awards	2001	The Marshall Mathers LP	Album of the Year	Nominated	
Grammy Awards	2001	The Marshall Mathers LP	Best Rap Album	Won	
Grammy Awards	2003	"Without Me"	Record of the Year	Nominated	
Grammy Awards	2003	"Without Me"	Best Male Rap Solo Performance	Nominated	
Grammy Awards	2003	"Without Me"	Best Music Video	Won	
Grammy Awards	2003	The Eminem Show	Album of the Year	Nominated	
Grammy Awards	2003	The Eminem Show	Best Rap Album	Won	
Grammy Awards	2004	"Lose Yourself"	Record of the Year	Nominated	
Grammy Awards	2004	"Lose Yourself"	Song of the Year	Nominated	
Grammy Awards	2004	"Lose Yourself"	Best Male Rap Solo Performance	Won	
Grammy Awards	2004	"Lose Yourself"	Best Rap Song	Won	
Grammy Awards	2004	"Lose Yourself"	Best Song Written for a Motion Picture, Television or Other Visual Media	Nominated	
Grammy Awards	2005	"Just Lose It"	Best Rap Solo Performance	Nominated	
Grammy Awards	2006	"Mockingbird"	Best Rap Solo Performance	Nominated	
Grammy Awards	2006	"Encore" (featuring Dr. Dre and 50 Cent)	Best Rap Performance by a Duo or Group	Nominated	
Grammy Awards	2006	Encore	Best Rap Album	Nominated	
Grammy Awards	2007	"Smack That" (with Akon)	Best Rap/Sung Collaboration	Nominated	
Grammy Awards	2007	"Shake That" (featuring Nate Dogg)	Best Rap/Sung Collaboration	Nominated	
Grammy Awards	2010	"Beautiful"	Best Rap Solo Performance	Nominated	
Grammy Awards	2010	"Crack a Bottle" (featuring Dr. Dre and 50 Cent)	Best Rap Performance by a Duo or Group	Won	
Grammy Awards	2010	Relapse	Best Rap Album	Won	
Grammy Awards	2011	Recovery	Best Rap Album	Won	
Grammy Awards	2011	Recovery	Album of the Year	Nominated	
Grammy Awards	2011	"Love the Way You Lie" (featuring Rihanna)	Record of the Year	Nominated	
Grammy Awards	2011	"Love the Way You Lie" (featuring Rihanna)	Song of the Year	Nominated	
Grammy Awards	2011	"Love the Way You Lie" (featuring Rihanna)	Best Rap/Sung Collaboration	Nominated	
Grammy Awards	2011	"Love the Way You Lie" (featuring Rihanna)	Best Rap Song	Nominated	
Grammy Awards	2011	"Love the Way You Lie" (featuring Rihanna)	Best Music Video	Nominated	
Grammy Awards	2011	"Airplanes, Part II" (with B.o.B and Hayley Williams)	Best Pop Collaboration with Vocals	Nominated	
Grammy Awards	2011	"Not Afraid"	Best Rap Solo Performance	Won	
Grammy Awards	2011	"Not Afraid"	Best Rap Song	Nominated	
Grammy Awards	2012	"I Need a Doctor" (with Dr. Dre and Skylar Grey)	Best Rap Song	Nominated	
Grammy Awards	2012	"I Need a Doctor" (with Dr. Dre and Skylar Grey)	Best Rap/Sung Collaboration	Nominated	
Grammy Awards	2012	Loud (as featured artist)	Album of the Year	Nominated	
Grammy Awards	2014	"Berzerk"	Best Rap Performance	Nominated	
Grammy Awards	2015	"Rap God"	Best Rap Performance	Nominated	
Grammy Awards	2015	"The Monster" (featuring Rihanna)	Best Rap/Sung Collaboration	Won	
Grammy Awards	2015	The Marshall Mathers LP 2	Best Rap Album	Won	
Grammy Awards	2019	"Lucky You" (featuring Joyner Lucas)	Best Rap Song	Nominated	
Grammy Awards	2025	"Houdini"	Best Rap Performance	Nominated	
Grammy Awards	2025	"Houdini"	Best Music Video	Nominated	
Grammy Awards	2025	The Death of Slim Shady (Coup De Grâce)	Best Rap Album	Nominated	
Golden Globe Awards	2003	"Lose Yourself"	Best Original Song	Nominated	
IFPI Hong Kong Top Sales Music Award	2006	Curtain Call: The Hits	Ten Best Sales Releases, Foreign	Won	
iHeartRadio Music Awards	2014	"The Monster" (featuring Rihanna)	Song Of The Year	Nominated	
iHeartRadio Music Awards	2014	"The Monster" (featuring Rihanna)	Best Collaboration	Nominated	
Italian Music Awards	2001	Eminem	Best International Male Artist	Nominated	
Italian Music Awards	2002	Eminem	Best International Male Artist	Nominated	
Italian Music Awards	2003	Eminem	Best International Male Artist	Nominated	
Japan Radio Popular Disc Awards	2001	Eminem	Best Male Vocalist	Won	
Juno Awards	2001	The Marshall Mathers LP	Best-Selling Album (foreign or domestic)	Won	
Juno Awards	2003	The Eminem Show	International Album of the Year	Won	
Juno Awards	2005	Encore	International Album of the Year	Nominated	
Juno Awards	2011	Recovery	International Album of the Year	Nominated	
Juno Awards	2014	The Marshall Mathers LP 2	International Album of the Year	Nominated	
Mnet Asian Music Awards	2002	Eminem	Best International Artist	Won	
MOBO Awards	2000	Eminem	Best Hip Hop Act	Won	
MOBO Awards	2010	Eminem	Best International Act	Won	
MTV Africa Music Awards	2010	Eminem	Best International Artist	Won	
MTV Asia Awards	2002	Eminem	Favorite Male Artist	Nominated	
MTV Asia Awards	2003	Eminem	Favorite Male Artist	Nominated	
MTV Asia Awards	2003	"Without Me"	Favorite Video	Nominated	
MTV Asia Awards	2004	Eminem	Favorite Male Artist	Nominated	
MTV Asia Awards	2006	Eminem	Favorite Male Artist	Nominated	
MTV Europe Music Awards	1999	Eminem	Best New Act	Nominated	
MTV Europe Music Awards	1999	Eminem	Best Hip-Hop Act	Won	
MTV Europe Music Awards	2000	Eminem	Best Hip-Hop Act	Won	
MTV Europe Music Awards	2000	Eminem	Best Male Act	Nominated	
MTV Europe Music Awards	2000	The Marshall Mathers LP	Best Album	Won	
MTV Europe Music Awards	2001	"Stan"	Best Song	Nominated	
MTV Europe Music Awards	2001	Eminem	Best Hip-Hop Act	Won	
MTV Europe Music Awards	2002	Eminem	Best Hip-Hop Act	Won	
MTV Europe Music Awards	2002	Eminem	Best Male Act	Won	
MTV Europe Music Awards	2002	The Eminem Show	Best Album	Won	
MTV Europe Music Awards	2002	"Without Me"	Best Video	Nominated	
MTV Europe Music Awards	2003	Eminem	Best Hip-Hop Act	Won	
MTV Europe Music Awards	2005	Eminem	Best Male	Nominated	
MTV Europe Music Awards	2009	Eminem	Best Urban Act	Nominated	
MTV Europe Music Awards	2009	Eminem	Best Male Act	Won	
MTV Europe Music Awards	2009	"We Made You"	Best Video	Nominated	
MTV Europe Music Awards	2010	Eminem	Best Hip-Hop Act	Won	
MTV Europe Music Awards	2011	Eminem	Best Hip-Hop Act	Won	
MTV Europe Music Awards	2011	Eminem	Best Male Act	Nominated	
MTV Europe Music Awards	2013	Eminem	Best Male	Nominated	
MTV Europe Music Awards	2013	Eminem	Global Icon Award	Won	
MTV Europe Music Awards	2013	Eminem	Best Hip-Hop Act	Won	
MTV Europe Music Awards	2014	Eminem	Best Hip-Hop Act	Nominated	
MTV Europe Music Awards	2014	Eminem	Best US Act	Nominated	
MTV Europe Music Awards	2014	Eminem	Best Male	Nominated	
MTV Europe Music Awards	2014	"The Monster" (featuring Rihanna)	Best Song	Nominated	
MTV Europe Music Awards	2017	Eminem	Best Live	Nominated	
MTV Europe Music Awards	2017	Eminem	Best Hip-Hop	Won	
MTV Europe Music Awards	2018	Eminem	Best Hip-Hop	Nominated	
MTV Europe Music Awards	2020	Eminem	Best Hip-Hop	Nominated	
MTV Europe Music Awards	2024	Eminem	Best Hip-Hop	Won	
MTV Europe Music Awards	2024	Best Video	"Houdini"	Nominated	
Italian MTV Awards	2014	Eminem	Super Man	Nominated	
Italian MTV Awards	2014	Eminem	Artist Saga	Nominated	
MTV Movie Awards	2003	"Jimmy "B-Rabbit" Smith Jr."	Best Male Performance	Won	
MTV Movie Awards	2003	"Jimmy "B-Rabbit" Smith Jr."	Best Breakthrough Male	Won	
MTV Video Music Awards	1999	"My Name Is"	Best Male Video	Nominated	
MTV Video Music Awards	1999	"My Name Is"	Best New Artist in a Video	Won	
MTV Video Music Awards	1999	"My Name Is"	Best Direction in a Video	Nominated	
MTV Video Music Awards	1999	"Guilty Conscience"	Breakthrough Video	Nominated	
MTV Video Music Awards	2000	"The Real Slim Shady"	Video of the Year	Won	
MTV Video Music Awards	2000	"The Real Slim Shady"	Best Male Video	Won	
MTV Video Music Awards	2000	"The Real Slim Shady"	Best Rap Video	Nominated	
MTV Video Music Awards	2000	"The Real Slim Shady"	Viewer's Choice	Nominated	
MTV Video Music Awards	2000	"The Real Slim Shady"	Best Direction in a Video	Nominated	
MTV Video Music Awards	2000	"The Real Slim Shady"	Best Editing in a Video	Nominated	
MTV Video Music Awards	2000	"Forgot About Dre" (with Dr. Dre)	Best Rap Video	Won	
MTV Video Music Awards	2001	"Stan" (featuring Dido)	Video of the Year	Nominated	
MTV Video Music Awards	2001	"Stan" (featuring Dido)	Best Male Video	Nominated	
MTV Video Music Awards	2001	"Stan" (featuring Dido)	Best Rap Video	Nominated	
MTV Video Music Awards	2001	"Stan" (featuring Dido)	Best Direction in a Video	Nominated	
MTV Video Music Awards	2001	"Stan" (featuring Dido)	Best Cinematography in a Video	Nominated	
MTV Video Music Awards	2002	"Without Me"	Video of the Year	Won	
MTV Video Music Awards	2002	"Without Me"	Best Male Video	Won	
MTV Video Music Awards	2002	"Without Me"	Best Rap Video	Won	
MTV Video Music Awards	2002	"Without Me"	Best Direction in a Video	Won	
MTV Video Music Awards	2002	"Without Me"	Best Editing in a Video	Nominated	
MTV Video Music Awards	2002	"Without Me"	Viewer's Choice	Nominated	
MTV Video Music Awards	2003	"Lose Yourself"	Video of the Year	Nominated	
MTV Video Music Awards	2003	"Lose Yourself"	Best Male Video	Nominated	
MTV Video Music Awards	2003	"Lose Yourself"	Best Rap Video	Nominated	
MTV Video Music Awards	2003	"Lose Yourself"	Best Video from a Film	Won	
MTV Video Music Awards	2003	"Lose Yourself"	Viewer's Choice	Nominated	
MTV Video Music Awards	2004	"My Band"	Video of the Year	Nominated	
MTV Video Music Awards	2004	"My Band"	Best Group Video	Nominated	
MTV Video Music Awards	2004	"My Band"	Best Rap Video	Nominated	
MTV Video Music Awards	2005	"Just Lose It"	Best Rap Video	Nominated	
MTV Video Music Awards	2005	"Mosh"	Breakthrough Video	Nominated	
MTV Video Music Awards	2009	"We Made You"	Video of the Year	Nominated	
MTV Video Music Awards	2009	"We Made You"	Best Hip-Hop Video	Won	
MTV Video Music Awards	2009	"We Made You"	Best Male Video	Nominated	
MTV Video Music Awards	2009	"We Made You"	Best Special Effects	Nominated	
MTV Video Music Awards	2010	"Not Afraid"	Video of the Year	Nominated	
MTV Video Music Awards	2010	"Not Afraid"	Best Hip-Hop Video	Won	
MTV Video Music Awards	2010	"Not Afraid"	Best Male Video	Won	
MTV Video Music Awards	2010	"Not Afraid"	Best Art Direction	Nominated	
MTV Video Music Awards	2010	"Not Afraid"	Best Cinematography	Nominated	
MTV Video Music Awards	2010	"Not Afraid"	Best Direction	Nominated	
MTV Video Music Awards	2010	"Not Afraid"	Best Editing	Nominated	
MTV Video Music Awards	2010	"Not Afraid"	Best Special Effects	Nominated	
MTV Video Music Awards	2011	"Love the Way You Lie" (featuring Rihanna)	Best Male Video	Nominated	
MTV Video Music Awards	2011	"Love the Way You Lie" (featuring Rihanna)	Best Cinematography	Nominated	
MTV Video Music Awards	2011	"Love the Way You Lie" (featuring Rihanna)	Best Direction	Nominated	
MTV Video Music Awards	2011	"Love the Way You Lie" (featuring Rihanna)	Best Video with a Message	Nominated	
MTV Video Music Awards	2014	"The Monster" (featuring Rihanna)	Best Male Video	Nominated	
MTV Video Music Awards	2014	"The Monster" (featuring Rihanna)	Best Collaboration	Nominated	
MTV Video Music Awards	2014	"The Monster" (featuring Rihanna)	Best Direction	Nominated	
MTV Video Music Awards	2014	"Berzerk"	Best Hip-Hop Video	Nominated	
MTV Video Music Awards	2014	"Rap God"	Best Art Direction	Nominated	
MTV Video Music Awards	2014	"Rap God"	Best Editing	Won	
MTV Video Music Awards	2014	"Rap God"	Best Visual Effects	Nominated	
MTV Video Music Awards	2018	"Walk on Water" (featuring Beyoncé)	Best Visual Effects	Nominated	
MTV Video Music Awards	2018	"River" (featuring Ed Sheeran)	Best Cinematography	Nominated	
MTV Video Music Awards	2020	"Godzilla" (featuring Juice WRLD)	Video of the Year	Nominated	
MTV Video Music Awards	2020	"Godzilla" (featuring Juice WRLD)	Best Hip-Hop	Nominated	
MTV Video Music Awards	2022	"From the D 2 the LBC"	Best Hip-Hop	Nominated	
MTV Video Music Awards	2024	"Houdini"	Video of the Year	Nominated	
MTV Video Music Awards	2024	"Houdini"	Best Hip-Hop	Won	
MTV Video Music Awards	2024	"Houdini"	Best Direction	Nominated	
MTV Video Music Awards	2024	"Houdini"	Best Editing	Nominated	
MTV Video Music Awards	2024	"Houdini"	Best Visual Effects	Won	
MTV Video Music Awards	2024	"Houdini"	Song of Summer	Nominated	
MTV Video Music Awards	2024	Eminem	Artist of the Year	Nominated	
MTV Video Music Awards	2024	"The Real Slim Shady" and "The Way I Am " (2000)	VMAs Most Iconic Performance	Nominated	
Much Music Video Awards	2003	"Lose Yourself"	People's Choice: Favorite international artist	Won	
Much Music Video Awards	2003	"Without Me"	Best international video - artist	Nominated	
Much Music Video Awards	2003	"Cleanin' Out My Closet"	Best international video - artist	Nominated	
Much Music Video Awards	2011	"Love the Way You Lie" (featuring Rihanna)	Most Watched Video of the Year	Nominated	
Much Music Video Awards	2011	"Love the Way You Lie" (featuring Rihanna)	International Video of the Year - Artist	Nominated	
Much Music Video Awards	2011	"Love the Way You Lie" (featuring Rihanna)	UR Fave International Artist	Nominated	
Much Music Video Awards	2012	"Lighters" (featuring Bruno Mars)	International Video of the Year - Group	Nominated	
NAACP Image Awards	2011	"Love the Way You Lie" (featuring Rihanna)	Best Collaboration	Nominated	
NRJ Music Awards	2005	Eminem	International Male Artist of The Year	Nominated	
NRJ Music Awards	2011	"Love the Way You Lie" (featuring Rihanna)	Best International Song	Nominated	
NRJ Music Awards	2011	"Love the Way You Lie" (featuring Rihanna)	Video of the Year	Nominated	
NRJ Music Awards	2011	Eminem and Rihanna	Best International Duo	Nominated	
Online Film Critics Society Awards	2003	8 Mile	Best Breakthrough Performance	Nominated	
People's Choice Awards	2002	Eminem	Favorite Male Musical Performer	Nominated	
People's Choice Awards	2003	Eminem	Favorite Male Musical Performer	Won	
People's Choice Awards	2007	"Shake That" (featuring Nate Dogg)	Favorite Hip-Hop Song	Nominated	
People's Choice Awards	2010	Eminem	Favorite Male Artist	Nominated	
People's Choice Awards	2010	Eminem	Favorite Hip-Hop Artist	Won	
People's Choice Awards	2011	Eminem	Favorite Hip-Hop Artist	Won	
People's Choice Awards	2011	Eminem	Favorite Male Artist	Won	
People's Choice Awards	2011	"Love the Way You Lie" (featuring Rihanna)	Favorite Song	Won	
People's Choice Awards	2011	"Love the Way You Lie" (featuring Rihanna)	Favorite Music Video	Won	
People's Choice Awards	2012	Eminem	Favorite Hip-Hop Artist	Won	
Pop Awards	2018	Eminem	Artist Of The Year Award	Nominated	
Pop Awards	2018	Revival	Album Of The Year Award	Nominated	
Primetime Emmy Awards	2022	The Pepsi Super Bowl LVI Halftime Show Starring Dr. Dre, Snoop Dogg, Mary J. Blige, Eminem, Kendrick Lamar and 50 Cent	Outstanding Variety Special (Live)	Won	
Spike Video Game Awards	2005	50 Cent: Bulletproof	Best Supporting Male Performance	Nominated	
Spike Video Game Awards	2010	"Won't Back Down"	Best Song In A Game	Nominated	
Spike Video Game Awards	2013	"Survival"	Best Song In A Game	Nominated	
Soul Train Music Awards	2010	"Love the Way You Lie" (featuring Rihanna)	Best Hip-Hop Song of the Year	Won	
Satellite Awards	2003	"Lose Yourself"	Best Original Song	Nominated	
Swiss Music Awards	2014	The Marshall Mathers LP 2	Best Album Urban International	Won	
Swiss Music Awards	2019	Eminem	Best International Solo Act	Won	
Teen Choice Awards	1999	"My Name Is"	Choice Rap Track	Won	
Teen Choice Awards	1999	"My Name Is"	Choice Music Video	Nominated	
Teen Choice Awards	1999	Eminem	Choice Breakout Artist	Nominated	
Teen Choice Awards	2000	"Forgot About Dre" (with Dr. Dre)	Choice Music - R&B/Hip-Hop Track	Nominated	
Teen Choice Awards	2000	"The Real Slim Shady"	Choice Music Video	Nominated	
Teen Choice Awards	2000	"The Real Slim Shady"	Choice Summer Song	Nominated	
Teen Choice Awards	2001	Eminem	Choice Music: Male Artist	Nominated	
Teen Choice Awards	2001	Eminem	Choice Music: R&B/Hip-Hop Artist	Nominated	
Teen Choice Awards	2001	The Marshall Mathers LP	Choice Music: Album	Nominated	
Teen Choice Awards	2003	Eminem	Choice Movie: Actor Drama/Action Adventure	Won	
Teen Choice Awards	2003	Eminem	Choice Crossover Artist	Nominated	
Teen Choice Awards	2003	Eminem	Choice Movie: Breakout Star - Male	Won	
Teen Choice Awards	2003	Eminem	Choice Music: Male Artist	Won	
Teen Choice Awards	2003	Eminem	Choice Music: Rap Artist	Won	
Teen Choice Awards	2003	Eminem and Brittany Murphy	Choice Movie Liplock	Nominated	
Teen Choice Awards	2003	The Eminem Show	Choice Music: Album	Nominated	
Teen Choice Awards	2005	Eminem	Choice Music: Rap Artist	Won	
Teen Choice Awards	2005	Eminem	Choice Music: Male Artist	Nominated	
Teen Choice Awards	2005	"Mockingbird"	Choice Music: Rap Track	Won	
Teen Choice Awards	2009	Relapse	Choice Music Album: Male	Nominated	
Teen Choice Awards	2010	Eminem	Choice Music: Best Rap Artist	Won	
Teen Choice Awards	2010	Eminem	Choice Summer Music Star - Male	Nominated	
Teen Choice Awards	2010	Relapse	Choice Music: Best Rap Album	Won	
Teen Choice Awards	2010	"Love the Way You Lie" (featuring Rihanna)	Choice Music: Rap/Hip-Hop Track	Won	
Teen Choice Awards	2011	Eminem	Choice Music: R&B/Hip-Hop Artist	Won	
Teen Choice Awards	2011	"I Need a Doctor" (with Dr. Dre and Skylar Grey)	Choice Music: R&B/Hip-Hop Track	Nominated	
Teen Choice Awards	2014	Eminem	Choice Music: R&B/Hip-Hop Artist	Nominated	
The Boombox Fan Choice Awards	2014	"Berzerk"	Hip-Hop Video of the Year	Nominated	
UK Music Video Awards	2011	"Love the Way You Lie" (featuring Rihanna)	Best Urban Video – International	Nominated	
Vibe Magazine Special Awards	2008	Eminem	Best Rapper Alive	Won	
World Music Awards	2001	Eminem	World's Best-Selling Rap/Hip-Hop Artist	Won	
World Music Awards	2003	Eminem	World's Best-Selling Pop/Rock Artist	Won	
World Music Awards	2003	Eminem	World's Best-Selling American Male Artist	Won	
World Music Awards	2005	Eminem	World's Best-Selling Pop/Rock Artist	Won	
World Music Awards	2005	Eminem	World's Best-Selling Rap/Hip-Hop Artist	Won	
World Music Awards	2010	Eminem	World's Best-Selling Rap/Hip-Hop Selling Artist	Nominated	
World Music Awards	2014	Eminem	World's Best-Selling Artist	Won	
World Music Awards	2014	Eminem	World's Best-Selling Rap/Hip-Hop Artist	Won	
World Music Awards	2014	Eminem	World's Best-Selling American Artist	Won	
World Soundtrack Awards	2003	"Lose Yourself"	Best Original Song Written for a Film	Nominated	
YouTube Music Awards	2013	Eminem	Artist of the Year	Won	
