= MTV Asia Award for Favorite Artist Taiwan =

The following is a list of MTV Asia Awards winners for Favorite Artist Taiwan.

Year	Artist	Ref.
2008	Show Lo	
2006	Wang Leehom	
2005	Jay Chou	
2004	A-Mei	
2003	Jay Chou	
2002	A-Mei	
