= MTV Asia Award for Favorite Artist Indonesia =

The following is a list of MTV Asia Awards winners for Favorite Artist Indonesia.

Year	Artist	Ref.
2008	Yovie & Nuno	
2006	Peterpan	
2005	Peterpan	
2004	Audy	
2003	Cokelat	
2002	Padi	
