= MTV Asia Award for Favorite Artist Malaysia =

The following is a list of MTV Asia Awards winners for Favourite Artist Malaysia.

Year	Artist	Ref.
2008	Nicholas Teo	
2006	Mawi	
2005	Siti Nurhaliza	
2004	Siti Nurhaliza	
2003	Siti Nurhaliza	
2002	Siti Nurhaliza	
