= MTV Asia Award for Favorite Artist India =

The following is a list of MTV Asia Awards winners for Favorite Artist India.

Year	Artist	Ref.
2006	Jal	
2005	Strings	
2004	Abhijeet	
2003	A. R. Rahman	
2002	Shaan	
