= MTV Asia Award for Favorite Artist Singapore =

The following is a list of MTV Asia Awards winners for Favorite Artist Singapore.

Year	Artist	Ref.
2008	Stefanie Sun	
2006	Taufik Batisah	
2005	Stefanie Sun	
2004	Stefanie Sun	
2003	Stefanie Sun	
2002	Stefanie Sun	
