= MTV Asia Award for Favorite Breakthrough Artist =

The following is a list of MTV Asia Awards winners for Favorite Breakthrough Artist.

Year	Artist	Ref.
2008	Leona Lewis	
2006	Fall Out Boy	
2005	Ashlee Simpson	
2004	T.A.T.u.	
2003	Avril Lavigne	
2002	Linkin Park	
