= MTV Asia Award for Favorite Artist Philippines =

The following is a list of MTV Asia Awards winners for Favorite Artist Philippines.

Year	Artist	Ref.
2008	Chicosci	
2006	Rivermaya	
2005	Rivermaya	
2004	Parokya ni Edgar	
2003	Regine Velasquez	
2002	Regine Velasquez	
