= MTV Asia Award for Favorite Artist Thailand =

The following is a list of MTV Asia Awards winners for Favorite Artist Thailand.

Year	Artist	Ref.
2008	Saksit Vejsupaporn	
2006	Tata Young	
2005	Silly Fools	
2004	Thongchai McIntyre	
2003	D2B	
2002	Pru	
