= MTV Asia Award for Favorite Female Artist =

The following is a list of MTV Asia Awards winners for Favorite Female Artist

Year	Artist
2006	Kelly Clarkson
2005	Avril Lavigne
2004	Christina Aguilera
2003	Avril Lavigne
2002	Britney Spears
