= MTV Asia Award for Favorite Pop Act =

The following is a list of MTV Asia Awards winners for Favorite Pop Act.

Year	Artist	Ref.
2006	Backstreet Boys	
2005	Simple Plan	
2004	Blue	
2003	Blue	
2002	Westlife	
