= MTV Asia Award for Favorite Male Artist =

The following is a list of MTV Asia Awards winners for Favorite Male Artist.

Year	Artist	Ref.
2006	Ricky Martin	
2005	Usher	
2004	Gareth Gates	
2003	Robbie Williams	
2002	Ricky Martin	
