= List of awards and nominations received by t.A.T.u. =

This is a list of awards, recognitions and achievements won by the group t.A.T.u.

== Awards and nominations ==
Award	Year	Nominee(s)	Category	Result	Ref.
BMI London Awards	2004	"All the Things She Said"	Award-Winning Song	Won	
BMI London Awards	2004	"All the Things She Said"	College Radio Song of the Year	Won	
Bed of the Year Award	2001	Themselves	Sex Dissidents	Won	
Dvizhenie Awards	2003	Themselves	Best Group	Won	
Echo Music Prize	2004	Themselves	Best International Newcomer	Nominated	
Echo Music Prize	2004	"All the Things She Said"	Single of the Year	Nominated	
Eska Music Awards	2003	Themselves	Event of the Year	Won	
Eurovision Song Contest	2003	"Ne ver', ne boysia"	Best Song	3rd place	
GQ Awards	2006	Themselves	Women of the Year	Won	
Golden Gramophone Awards	2002	"Not Gonna Get Us"	Golden Gramophone Award	Won	
Hit FM Awards	2001	"All the Things She Said"	100% Hit	Won	
Hit FM Awards	2002	"Not Gonna Get Us"	100% Hit	Won	
Hit FM Awards	2003	"Ne ver', ne boysia"	100% Hit	Won	
Hungarian Music Awards	2004	200 km/h in the Wrong Lane	Best Foreign Pop Album	Nominated	
IFPI Hong Kong Top Sales Music Awards	2003	200 km/h in the Wrong Lane	Top 10 Best Selling Foreign Albums	Won	
IFPI Platinum Europe Awards	2002	200 km/h in the Wrong Lane	Album Title	Won	
International Dance Music Awards	2004	Themselves	Best New Dance Group	Nominated	
Jabra Music Awards	2007	Themselves	Best Band in the World	Nominated	
Japan Gold Disc Awards	2004	Themselves	International New Artist of the Year	Won	
Japan Gold Disc Awards	2004	200 km/h in the Wrong Lane	International Album of the Year	Won	
Los Premios MTV Latinoamérica	2003	Themselves	Best New Artist — International	Nominated	
Love Radio Awards	2009	Themselves	Group of the Year	Nominated	
Lunas del Auditorio	2007	Themselves	Best Foreign Pop Artist	Nominated	
MTV Asia Awards	2004	Themselves	Favorite Breakthrough Artist	Won	
MTV Asia Awards	2004	Themselves	Favorite Pop Act	Nominated	
MTV Europe Music Awards	2001	Themselves	Best Russian Act	Nominated	
MTV Europe Music Awards	2002	Themselves	Best Russian Act	Nominated	
MTV Europe Music Awards	2003	Themselves	Best Russian Act	Nominated	
MTV Europe Music Awards	2006	Themselves	Best Russian Act	Nominated	
MTV Italian Music Awards	2006	Themselves	Best Group	Won	
MTV Russia Music Awards	2006	Themselves	Artist of the Year	Nominated	
MTV Russia Music Awards	2006	Themselves	Group of the Year	Nominated	
MTV Russia Music Awards	2006	Themselves	Pop Act of the Year	Nominated	
MTV Russia Music Awards	2006	"All About Us"	Song of the Year	Nominated	
MTV Russia Music Awards	2006	"All About Us"	Video of the Year	Won	
MTV Russia Music Awards	2008	Themselves	MTV Legend	Won	
MTV Video Music Awards	2001	"All the Things She Said"	Viewer's Choice - Russia	Won	
MTV Video Music Brazil	2003	"All the Things She Said"	Best International Video	Nominated	
Muz-TV Awards	2003	Themselves	Best Dance Act	Nominated	
Muz-TV Awards	2003	Themselves	Best Pop Group	Nominated	
Muz-TV Awards	2003	200 km/h in the Wrong Lane	Album of the Year	Nominated	
Muz-TV Awards	2003	"A Simple Motion"	Video of the Year	Won	
Muz-TV Awards	2006	Themselves	Best Pop Group	Won	
Muz-TV Awards	2006	Lyudi Invalidy	Album of the Year	Nominated	
Muz-TV Awards	2006	"All About Us"	Song of the Year	Won	
Muz-TV Awards	2006	"All About Us"	Video of the Year	Won	
NRJ Radio Awards	2003	Themselves	Best International New Artist	Won	
NRJ Radio Awards	2006	Themselves	Best International Group	Won	
NRJ Radio Awards	2006	Themselves	Best International Pop	Won	
Ovaciya Awards	2002	"Not Gonna Get Us"	Best Song	Won	
Polish Internet Music Awards	2003	Themselves	Best International Band	Won	
Polish Internet Music Awards	2003	200 km/h in the Wrong Lane	Best International Album	Won	
Popov Radio Awards	2007	Themselves	Best Radio Contribution	Won	
Popov Radio Awards	2007	Themselves	Special Award	Won	
Viva Comet Awards	2003	Themselves	Best International Newcomer	Won	
Viva Comet Awards	2008	Themselves	Special Award	Won	
World Music Awards	2003	Themselves	World's Best Selling Pop Group Artist	Won	
World Music Awards	2003	Themselves	World's Best Selling Dance Group	Won	
World Music Awards	2003	Themselves	World's Best Selling Duo	Won	
ZD Awards	2006	Themselves	Outstanding Contribution to Music	Won	
ZD Awards	2006	Themselves	Best Pop Group	Nominated	
ZD Awards	2006	Themselves	Best Dance Act	Nominated	
ZD Awards	2006	t.A.T.u.'s Return	Music Moment of the Year	Nominated	
ZD Awards	2006	Lyudi Invalidy	Album of the Year	Nominated	
ZD Awards	2006	"All About Us"	Video of the Year	Nominated	
ZD Awards	2007	Themselves	Best Group	Nominated	
Žebřík Music Awards	2002	Themselves	Best International Průser	Nominated	
Žebřík Music Awards	2005	Themselves	Best International Průser	Nominated	
