= Audy Item =

Indonesian singer (born 1981)

- Born: Paula Allodya Item; 23 April 1981 (age 44); Jakarta, Indonesia
- Genres: Pop; R&B; pop rock
- Occupation: Singer
- Years active: 2000–present
- Labels: Sony BMG Indonesia, Columbia Records, Epic Records
- Spouse: Iko Uwais

Paula Allodya Item, also known as Audy Item, (born 23 April 1981) is an Indonesian singer.

== Personal life ==
Item is the youngest of three children born to jazz musician Jopie Item and Evie Aquanthie Aziz. Her oldest brother, Stevie Item, is a guitarist in Andra and the Backbone and Deadsquad. She is married to Iko Uwais, and they have two daughters.

== Career ==
=== 2002–2004: 18 and 20-02 ===
Audy signed a recording contract with Sony BMG Music Indonesia and releasing debut studio album 18 which took from her age. Her debut single "Janji Diatas Ingkar (Mendua)" was released in 2002 and became a success in Indonesian music charts. Other singles were produced, such as "Bila Saja", "Menangis Semalam" and "Arti Hadirmu". The album has seen success and became best-selling in the market, including some singles, and making her winning many awards at other annual awards, Most Favorite Female at the 2003 MTV Indonesia Awards, four awards at the Anugerah Musik Indonesia, including Best Pop Album, etc.

Her second studio album 20-02 was released in 2004 and got back successful with single "Lagu Sendu" and "Dibalas Dengan Dusta" which manage earning for Favorite Artist Indonesia at the 2004 MTV Asia Awards in Singapore. Audy had listed by MURI for most signature in album during two hours. In 2005, Audy returning released repackaged version and adding new single, "Temui Aku", "Pertama Kali", and other.

=== 2006–2010: 23-03 and Selalu Terdepan ===
After her 20-02, Audy returning released third studio album 23-03 and produced first single "Untuk Sahabat" with Indonesian singer and actress Nindy, which was used in a commercial for Olay. She had collaboration with Canadian pop duo Same Same "Without You" for her Indonesian version. Previously, never collaboration with used version in other countries, like Thailand, Malaysia, Philippines and China.

After four years vacuum, Audy released fourth studio album Selalu Terdepan, which became her last album in music career. First single "Lama Lama Aku Bosan" is her comeback in music industry. Her album also released in Malaysia after two years ago.

== Discography ==
=== Studio albums ===
- 18 (2002)
- 20-02 (2004)
- 20-02 Repackage (2005)
- 23-03 (2006)
- Selalu Terdepan (2010)

== Awards and nominations ==
List of award nominations and awards won by Audy Item
Year	Award	Category	Recipients	Result
2003	MTV Indonesia Awards	Most Favorite Female	"Menangis Semalam"	Won
2003	Anugerah Musik Indonesia	Best Pop Female Solo Artist	"Menangis Semalam"	Won
2003	Anugerah Musik Indonesia	Best of the Best Production Work	"Menangis Semalam"	Won
2003	Anugerah Musik Indonesia	Best Rock Female Solo Artist	"Bila Saja"	Won
2003	Anugerah Musik Indonesia	Best Pop Album	18	Won
2003	Clear Top 10 Awards	Fabulous Album	18	Won
2003	Clear Top 10 Awards	Funkiest Female	Audy	Won
2004	MTV Asia Awards	Favorite Artist Indonesia	Audy	Won
2004	MURI	Most Signatures in Postcard/Cover Album in 2 Hours	Audy	Won
2013	Anugerah Musik Indonesia	Best Pop Female Solo Artist	"Pendamping Hidupku"	Nominated
