= Pug Jelly =

Pop punk band

- Origin: Singapore
- Genre: Pop punk
- Years active: 1999–2005
- Label: Universal
- Past members: Sam Cooper; Matt Cooper; Masashi Kimura; Lewis Farman; Adam Nelson; Chris Verhoeven

Pug Jelly was a pop punk band based in Singapore.

== History ==
Pug Jelly was made up of Australians Sam Cooper (lead vocals, bass) and Matt Cooper (drums), together with Japanese Masashi Kimura (backing vocals, guitar). Other members have included Lewis Farman (vocals, guitar), Adam Nelson (rhythm guitar) and Chris Verhoeven (rhythm guitar). The Cooper brothers and Kimura met while attending high school in Singapore.

Pug Jelly released their only album Motivation for Getting Up in the Morning under Universal Records. They opened for Avril Lavigne, Simple Plan, Sum 41 and Fall Out Boy. They were nominated for the MTV Asia Awards 2005. The first single off their album, "Come Home Soon", went to No.1 on radio charts in Singapore.

== Hiatus ==
After the tour, the band went on hiatus; but re-established itself for a short period under the name "Saw Loser". They performed in an Asian tour in 2007, which began in Indonesia and included Japan and Singapore.

== Dirt Radicals ==
The Coopers and Kimura formed Dirt Radicals in December 2009 after a four-year hiatus from their previous band. On 3 August 2010, the band released their debut album ... I've Got a Rad Feelin' About This! which was produced by Singapore-based producer Leonard Soosay. The first single, "Pack Your Bags", received hi-rotation on radio stations Power 98FM and 91.3FM as well as airplay on MTV Asia. 987FM featured the band on their Saturday evening segment 'Home' and played various tracks off the album. The Dirt Radicals spent the majority of 2010 and 2011 touring Southeast Asia, taking part in rock festivals such as Spring Scream (Taiwan), 1000 Bands United (Indonesia), Punkafoolic (Japan), Java Rockin' Land (Indonesia), and Baybeats (Singapore).
