= Saksit Vejsupaporn =

Thai pop singer and pianist

Tor Saksit Vejsupaporn ศักดิ์สิทธิ์ เวชสุภาพร
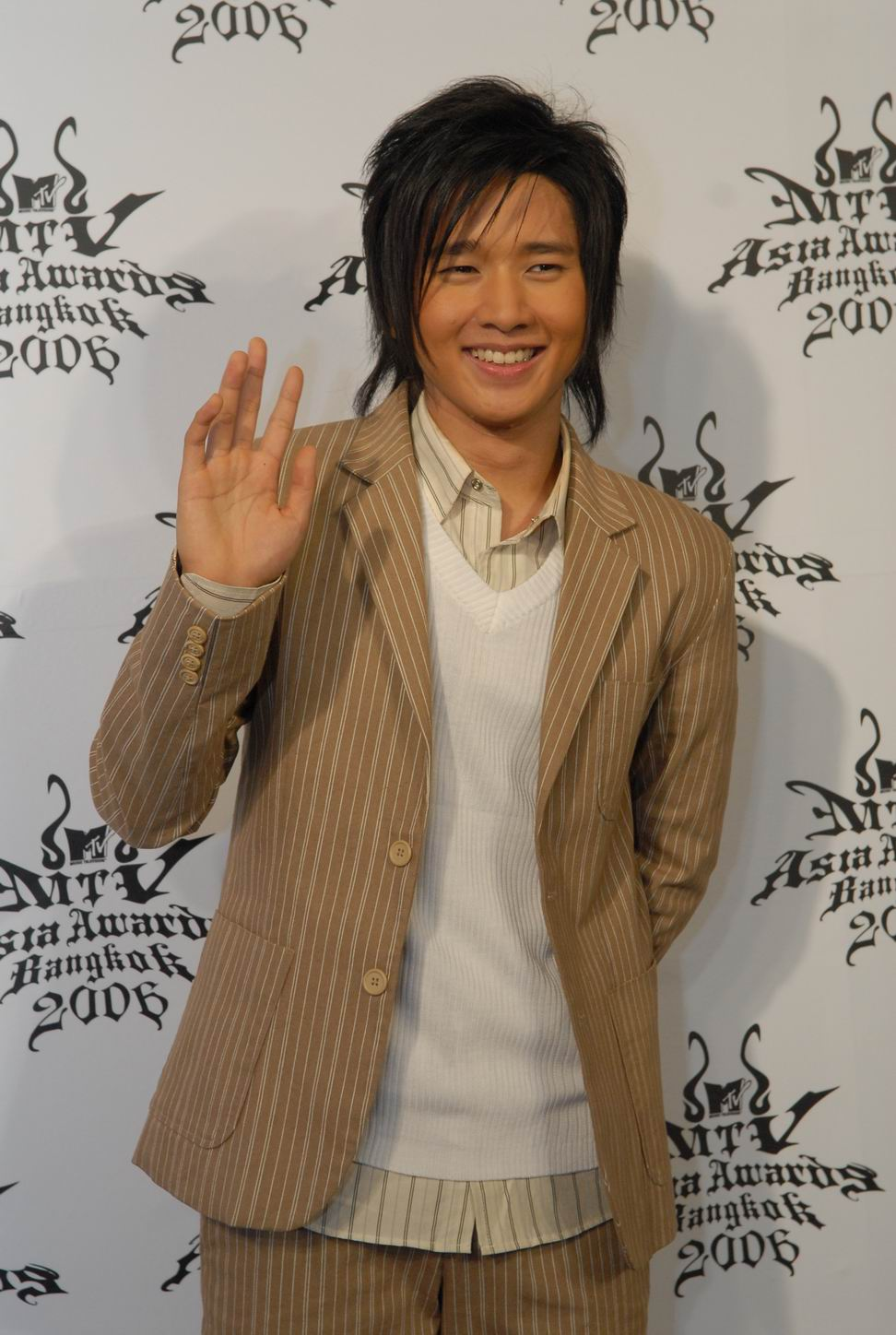
- At MTV Asia Awards 2006

Background information
- Also known as: ToR+; Tor; โต๋
- Born: Saksit Vejsupaporn; 20 January 1984 (age 42); Bangkok, Thailand
- Genres: Pop; R&B
- Occupations: Singer; pianist
- Instrument: Piano
- Years active: 2003–present
- Labels: Bakery Music; Sony BMG
- Spouse: Pitchayatan Chanput (m. 2022)
- Website: Official website

Saksit Vejsupaporn (Thai: ศักดิ์สิทธิ์ เวชสุภาพร, RTGS: Saksit Wetsuphaphon, pronounced [sàksìt wêtsùʔpʰaːpʰɔːn]; born 20 January 1984), popularly known by the nickname Tor (stylized ToR+; โต๋, RTGS: To, [tǒː]), is a Thai pop singer and pianist.

== Biography ==
Saksit was born on 20 January 1984. His father, Nakorn Vejsupaporn, was lead and guitarist for the Thai band Grand Ex', which was active during the 1970s and 1980s. Saksit began playing the piano at the age of three, and played for church from the age of nine. (He is a Protestant.) His early accomplishments include winning the Trinity College Awards Thailand in 1999. He attended primary school at Bangkok Adventist Church School and secondary school at Ekamai International School, and graduated BBA with honours from Assumption University.

Saksit began working with Boyd Kosiyabong, playing piano accompaniment in Boyd's Million Ways to Love Part 1 concert in 2003, and releasing a piano instrumental album of Boyd's compositions under the Bakery Music label in the same year. In 2004, Saksit and four other members of the group B5 (which debuted at the 2003 concert) released their Event album, which featured Saksit singing "Khon Mai Phiset" (คนไม่พิเศษ, literally non-special person) and playing piano for all songs. He released another instrumental piano album titled Piano & I the same year.

Saksit released his first solo vocal album, Living in C Major, in February 2007. The song "Rak Ter" (รักเธอ, also Ruk Tur, lit. love you) became an instant hit, placing at number one on Seed 97.5 FM's charts for five weeks. He also released Piano & I Part II, an instrumental album, that November.

Saksit won numerous national awards in 2007 and 2008, including the Favourite Artist of Thailand title at the 2008 MTV Asia Awards held in Genting, Malaysia, in August 2008. This was followed the same month by the release of "Munk?" (มั้ง?, lit. maybe), a single from the upcoming ToR+ Munk? album, which rose to number one on Seed FM and EFM within two weeks.

Since 2007, Saksit has been a presenter for Brand's chicken soup (a product family of Cerebos Thailand), and appears on a number of advertisement campaigns for the product. He usually asked about absolute pitch when he appears on TV shows. Saksit also competed in The Mask Singer 2 and he reached to semi-final. He captured so many asian fans' heart with this three languages competition.

== Personal life ==
He has been with Channel 3 news anchor Pitchayatan Chanput for nearly a decade. After dating for almost 10 years, they became engaged in January 2021 and married in a private ceremony in May 2022.

== Discography ==
- ToR+ Vejsupaporn Plays Boyd Kosiyabong Songbook (5 July 2003, instrumental)
- B5: Event (30 March 2004, with B5)
- Piano & I (28 October 2004, instrumental)
- Living in C Major (February 2007)
- Piano & I Part II (November 2007, instrumental)
- ToR+ Munk? (21 October 2008)
- Piano & I Asian Edition (2008, instrumental)
- Piano & I Part III (19 February 2010)
- Where Is Love? (27 April 2011)
- Add 9 (2014)
- No Te Vas by Dvicio (feat. Tor+ Saksit) (6/8/2017)
