= Cokelat =

Indonesian rock band

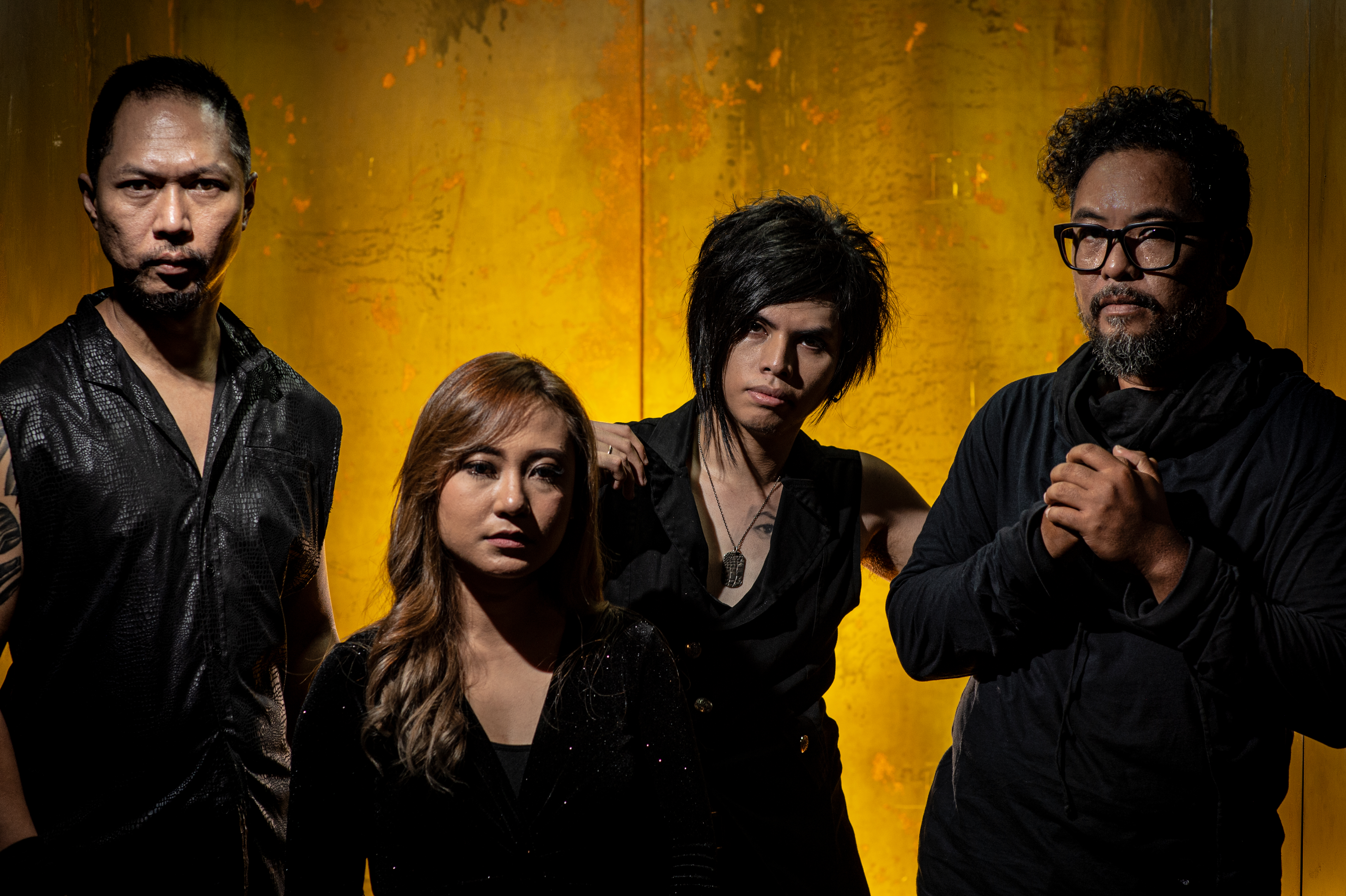
- Cokelat in 2020

Background information
- Origin: Bandung, West Java, Indonesia
- Genres: Alternative rock; hard rock; emo; pop-punk; pop rock
- Years active: 1996–present
- Labels: Sony Music Indonesia (2000–2013); POS Entertainment (2013–2015); VMC Music (2016–2017); Halo Entertainment Indonesia (2017–2019); Pro-M (2019–2021)
- Members: Edwin Marshal Syarif; Ernest Fardiyan Syarif; Ronny Nugroho; Axel Andaviar; Kikan
- Past members: Ervin; Aiu Ratna; Sarah

Cokelat (English: Chocolate) are an Indonesian rock band, formed in Bandung, West Java, in 1996. They have released seven albums.

== Career ==
The band was formed at the Sekolah Tinggi Seni Rupa & Desain Indonesia in Bandung in 1996. The band's name, Cokelat, order meant to they are liked by many people like chocolate. Their music originally was influenced by Frente, Alanis Morissette and The Cranberries.

In February 2000, they released the album Untuk Bintang with "Pergi" as the main track.

In 2001, the band released Rasa Baru with "Karma" as the first track.

In 2002, they released a repackaged version of Rasa Baru; the singles were "Bendera" and "Luka Lama".

In 2003, the band released the album Segitiga on an airplane in flight.

In 2004, they released the album Dari Hati with "Saat Jarak Memisahkan" as the main track.

In 2009, they released the single "Lima Menit untuk Lima Tahun" in order to socialize the 2009 Indonesian legislative election.

In March 2010, Kikan resigned, and in June 2010 the drummer Ervin resigned or was fired. Sarah replaced Kikan as the vocalist and the drummer position is filled by additional player.

In 2020, Cokelat announced Aiu Ratna (ex garasi band) is filling the lead singer duty.

== See also ==
- List of alternative-rock artists
- List of Indonesian musicians and musical groups
- List of Sony BMG artists
- Music of Indonesia
