= Sun Yue (singer) =

Chinese singer

- 孙悦
- Born: 19 June 1972 (age 52); Harbin, Heilongjiang, China
- Occupations: Singer; actress
- Years active: 1994–present
- Spouse: Wu Feizhou (m. 2006)
- Children: 1
- Relatives: Sun Hongbo
- Musical career
- Genres: Mandopop
- Instrument: Vocals

Chinese name
- Traditional Chinese: 孫悅
- Simplified Chinese: 孙悦
Transcriptions
Standard Mandarin
- Hanyu Pinyin: Sūn Yuè

Sun Yue (Chinese: 孙悦; born 19 June 1972) is a Chinese singer. She first became known for her 1994 hit single Zhu Ni Ping'an (祝你平安; "Wishing You Well").

== Personal life ==
Sun has an elder brother named Sun Hongbo (孙洪波). In 2005, she married Wu Feizhou (吴飞舟) and they had a son the following year.

== Discography ==
Albums:

- 1995 Xīnqíng bùcuò
- 1996 Huǒbàn
- 1997 Wèile zhè yītiān xīngē +jīngxuǎn
- 1998 Hǎorén hǎo mèng
- 1998 Huānlè zhōngguó nián
- 1999 Kuàilè zhǐnán
- 2000 Dàjiā yì qǐlái xīngē +jīngxuǎn
- 2000 Zěnmó HAPPY
- 2002 Bǎihé huā
- 2004 Tā hé tāmen
- 2006 Xìngfú shālòu
- 2010 12th Album, 3 vols.
- 2022 Sunny time
