= MTV Asia Awards =

Former music award ceremony

- Presented by: MTV Asia
- First award: 2002
- Final award: 2008
- Website: http://www.mtvasiaawards.com

The MTV Asia Awards was the Asian equivalent of the European MTV EMA. Held from 2002 to 2008, the show gave recognition and awards to Asian and international artists in achievement, cinema, fashion, humanitarian, and music. Just like the EMAs, most of the awards were voted by viewers from the Asian region.

The trophy design was a gold toblerone-like bar. The twin prism shape represents the letter M and double A, the acronyms for MTV Asia Awards.

The show was absent in 2007 and was discontinued after 2008.

== Ceremonies ==
Year	Date	Theme	Host city	Venue	Hosts
2008	August 2, 2008	M Is back!	Genting Highlands, Malaysia	Arena of Stars	Jared Leto, Karen Mok
2006	May 6, 2006	Codehunters	Bangkok, Thailand	Royal Paragon Hall	Wang Leehom, Kelly Rowland
2005	February 3, 2005	MTV Asia Aid	Bangkok, Thailand	Impact Arena	Alicia Keys
2004	February 14, 2004	Valentine's Day	Singapore	Singapore Indoor Stadium	Vanness Wu, Michelle Branch
2003	January 24, 2003	MTV Cube	Singapore	Singapore Indoor Stadium	Shaggy, Coco Lee
2002	February 2, 2002	Aliens	Singapore	Singapore Indoor Stadium	Mandy Moore, Ronan Keating

== Categories ==
=== Viewers' choice awards ===
==== Regional awards ====
- Favorite Artist Mainland China
- Favorite Artist Hong Kong
- Favorite Artist India
- Favorite Artist Indonesia
- Favorite Artist Korea
- Favorite Artist Malaysia
- Favorite Artist Philippines
- Favorite Artist Singapore
- Favorite Artist Taiwan
- Favorite Artist Thailand

==== International awards ====
- Favorite Breakthrough Artist
- Favorite Female Artist
- Favorite Male Artist
- Favorite Pop Act
- Favorite Rock Act
- Favorite Video

=== Special awards ===
Year	Award	Recipient
2008	The Inspiration Award	Karen Mok
2008	edc Style Award	Panic! at the Disco
2008	The Knockout Award	The Click Five
2006	The Style Award	Jolin Tsai
2006	Outstanding Achievement in Popular Music	Destiny's Child
2006	The Inspiration Award	Thongchai McIntyre
2006	Breakthrough Collaboration Japan	Teriyaki Boyz
2005	Asian Film Award	Kung Fu Hustle
2005	Voice Of Asia	Siti Nurhaliza
2005	Inspiration Award	2004 Tsunami victims
2004	Asian Film Award	Michelle Yeoh
2004	Lifetime Achievement Award	Mariah Carey
2004	The Inspiration Award	Anita Mui
2004	Favorite Breakthrough Artist	T.A.T.u.
2004	Most Influential Artist Award	BoA
2003	Asian Film Award	Devdas
2003	The Style Award	Avril Lavigne
2003	The Inspiration Award	F4
2002	Favorite Film	Crouching Tiger, Hidden Dragon
2002	Favorite Fashion Designer	Donatella Versace
2002	The Inspiration Award	Jackie Chan
2002	Favorite Indian Film Song	"Jaane Kyon"
2002	Most Influential Artist Award	Ayumi Hamasaki
