= MTV Asia Awards 2008 =

- Date: August 2, 2008
- Location: Arena of Stars, Genting Highlands, Malaysia
- Hosted by: Jared Leto, Karen Mok

The MTV Asia Awards 2008 returned on August 2, 2008, after a one-year hiatus. The event was held at the 6,000-seat Arena of Stars in Genting Highlands, Malaysia. This was the first time the award show was held in Malaysia. This was the sixth and final MTV Asia Awards.

Nominees were announced on June 14, 2008, via the channel. At the same day the MTV Asia Awards official website was also reopened. Voting commences from June 14 until July 25, 2008. Unlike previous award shows, international categories were not chosen by viewers (except for the Favorite International Artist in Asia award) and included for the first time Best Hook Up, Bring Da House Down, and the Innovation Award.

Viewers were able to vote from the official site or by text messaging service. The event was hosted by Jared Leto and Karen Mok as co-host.

Nominees in each category are listed alphabetically, winners are bolded.

== Performers ==
- Jabbawockeez
- The Pussycat Dolls
- OneRepublic
- Electrico & Stefanie Sun
- The Script
- Leona Lewis
- Super Junior
- The Click Five
- Panic! at the Disco

Also a special performance from Project E.A.R., a rap group consisting of at least one personnel from Hip Hop group Ahli Fiqir (Singapore), Pop Shuvit (Malaysia), Saint Loco (Indonesia), Slapshock (Philippines), Silksounds and Thaitanium from Thailand.

== Presenters ==
- Dave Farrell
- Jaclyn Victor
- Joe Flizzow
- Leo Ku
- Miguel Chavez
- Moots!
- The Pussycat Dolls
- Show Lo
- Stefanie Sun
- The Script

== International awards ==
=== Favorite International Artist in Asia ===
- Avril Lavigne
- Fergie
- Justin Timberlake
- **Linkin Park**

=== Bring Da House Down ===
- Black Eyed Peas
- Christina Aguilera
- **Muse**
- Linkin Park

=== The Innovation Award ===
- Goldfrapp
- Gwen Stefani
- Kanye West
- **Radiohead**

=== Best Hook Up ===
- **OneRepublic feat. Timbaland – "Apologize"**
- Rihanna feat. Jay Z – "Umbrella"
- Avril Lavigne feat. Lil Mama – "Girlfriend"
- Beyoncé & Shakira – "Beautiful Liar"

=== Breakthrough Artist ===
- OneRepublic
- **Leona Lewis**
- Daughtry
- Mika

=== Video Star ===
- **Thirty Seconds to Mars – "A Beautiful Lie"**
- Justice – "D.A.N.C.E."
- Fergie – "Clumsy"
- Panic! at the Disco – "Nine in the Afternoon"

== Regional awards ==
=== Favorite Artist Mainland China ===
- The Flowers
- **Li Yuchun**
- Wang Feng
- Yang Kun

=== Favorite Artist Hong Kong ===
- Andy Lau
- Eason Chan
- Joey Yung
- **Leo Ku**

=== Favorite Artist Indonesia ===
- Andra and The BackBone
- **Yovie & Nuno**
- Mulan Jameela
- Nidji

=== Favorite Artist Korea ===
- Big Bang
- TVXQ
- Girls' Generation
- Wonder Girls
- **Super Junior**

=== Favorite Artist Malaysia ===
- Faizal Tahir
- Pop Shuvit
- **Nicholas Teo**
- Siti Nurhaliza

=== Favorite Artist Philippines ===
- Urbandub
- Sandwich
- Sponge Cola
- **Chicosci**

=== Favorite Artist Singapore ===
- Electrico
- JJ Lin
- Tanya Chua
- **Stefanie Sun**

=== Favorite Artist Taiwan ===
- Mayday
- Jolin Tsai
- S.H.E
- **Show Lo**

=== Favorite Artist Thailand ===
- Bodyslam
- K-Otic
- **Saksit Vejsupaporn**
- Groove Riders

== Special awards ==
=== The Style Award ===
- Panic! at the Disco

=== The Knockout Award ===
- The Click Five

=== The Inspiration Award ===
- Karen Mok
