= MTV Asia Awards 2005 =

MTV Asia Aid 2005
- Date: February 3, 2005
- Location: Impact Arena, Bangkok, Thailand
- Hosted by: Alicia Keys

The MTV Asia Awards 2005 (rebranded as MTV Asia Aid 2005) took place in Bangkok, Thailand on February 3, 2005. The event was held at the Impact Arena and was hosted by Alicia Keys. The ceremony was renamed as MTV Asia Aid 2005 in commemoration of the 2004 tsunami that took place several weeks before, UNICEF was the primary recipient of funds raised by the event. Good Charlotte, Kelly Clarkson, Hoobastank, Simple Plan, and Alicia Keys are among those who perform.

Nominees in each category are listed alphabetically, winners are bolded.

== International awards ==
=== Favorite Pop Act ===
- Blue
- Keane
- No Doubt
- Outkast
- **Simple Plan**

=== Favorite Rock Act ===
- Green Day
- **Hoobastank**
- Jet
- Sum 41
- The Rasmus

=== Favorite Video ===
- Franz Ferdinand — "Take Me Out"
- Jet — "Are You Gonna Be My Girl"
- Keane — "Everybody's Changing"
- Kylie Minogue — "Red Blooded Woman"
- **Maroon 5 — "She Will Be Loved"**

=== Favorite Female Artist ===
- Alicia Keys
- **Avril Lavigne**
- Britney Spears
- Kylie Minogue
- Norah Jones

=== Favorite Male Artist ===
- Enrique Iglesias
- Josh Groban
- Nelly
- Robbie Williams
- **Usher**

=== Favorite Breakthrough Artist ===
- **Ashlee Simpson**
- Jet
- Joss Stone
- Keane
- The Rasmus

== Regional awards ==
=== Favorite Artist Mainland China ===
- Huaer Band
- Jin Haixin
- Sha Bao;iang
- Sun Nan
- **Sun Yue**

=== Favorite Artist Hong Kong ===
- Andy Lau
- Jacky Cheung
- **Joey Yung**
- Leo Ku
- Twins

=== Favorite Artist India ===
- Bombay Vikings
- Jagjit Singh
- Harry Anand
- Shaan
- **Strings**

=== Favorite Artist Indonesia ===
- Agnes Monica
- Ari Lasso
- Glenn Fredly
- **Peterpan**
- Ten 2 Five

=== Favorite Artist Korea ===
- Lee Soo-young
- **Rain**
- Seven
- Shinhwa
- Shin Seung-hun

=== Favorite Artist Malaysia ===
- Misha Omar
- Ruffedge
- **Siti Nurhaliza**
- Spider
- Too Phat

=== Favorite Artist Philippines ===
- Bamboo
- Dice and K9
- Parokya ni Edgar
- Radioactive Sago Project
- **Rivermaya**

=== Favorite Artist Singapore ===
- A-do
- Electrico
- Huang Yida
- Pug Jelly
- **Stefanie Sun**

=== Favorite Artist Taiwan ===
- F.I.R.
- **Jay Chou**
- Jolin Tsai
- Mayday
- S.H.E

=== Favorite Artist Thailand ===
- A Cappella 7
- Joey Boy
- Lanna Commins
- Modern Dog
- **Silly Fools**

== Special awards ==
=== The Asian Film Award ===
- Kung Fu Hustle

=== Voice of Asia ===
- Siti Nurhaliza

=== Inspiration Award ===
- 2004 Tsunami victims

== Gallery ==
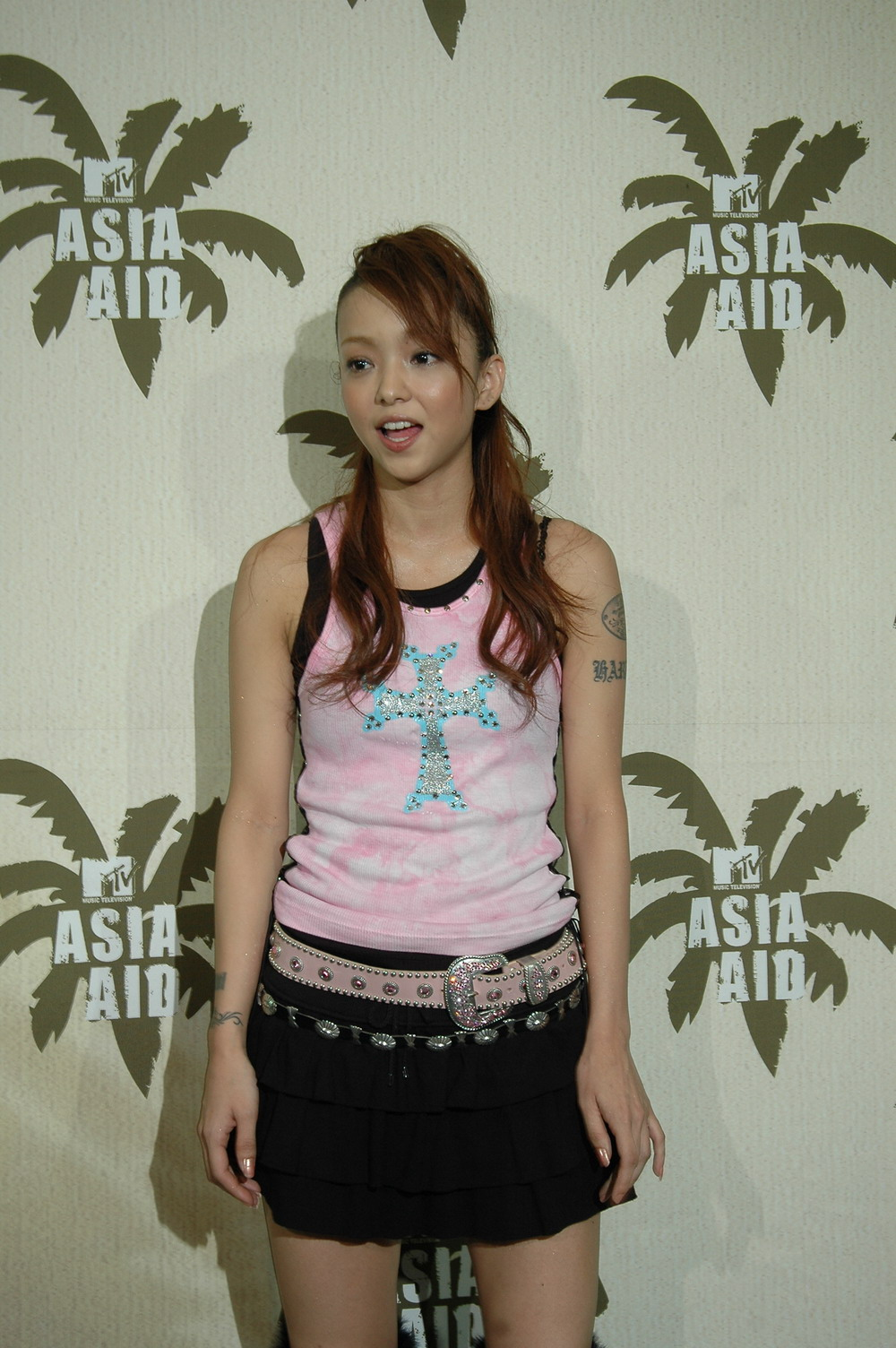
Namie Amuro

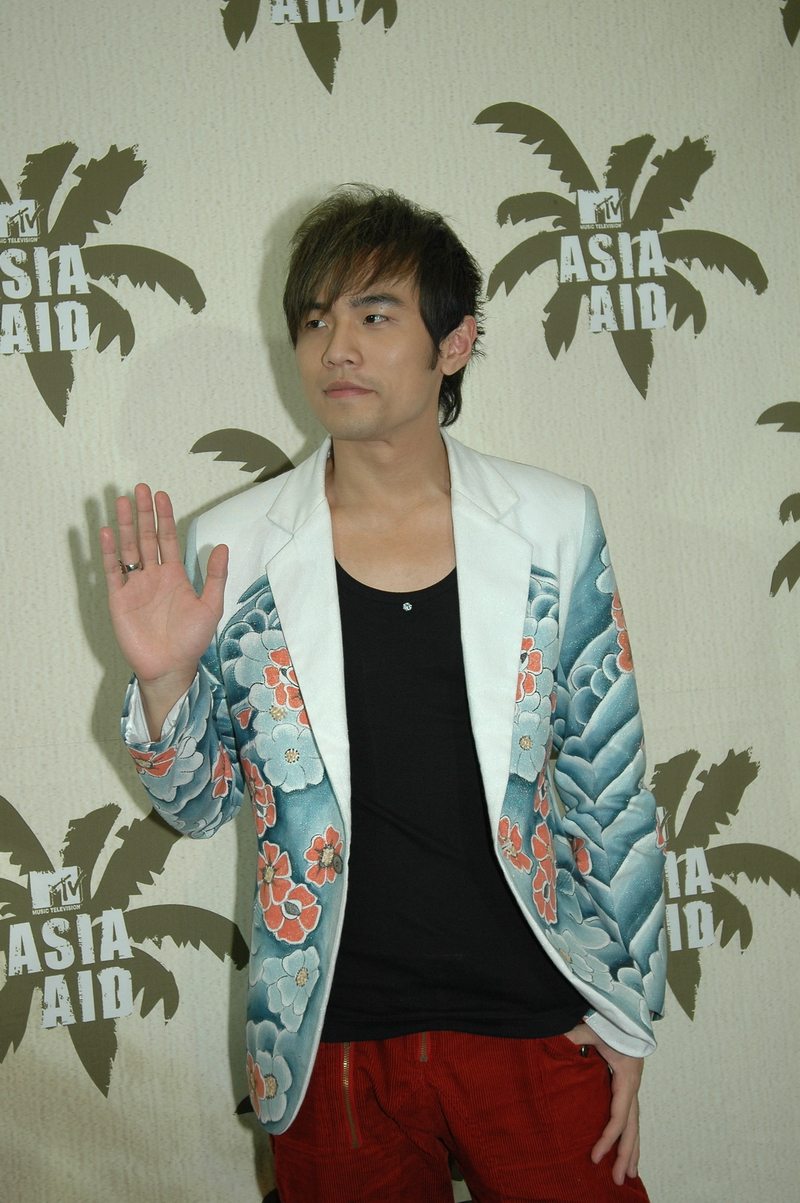
Jay Chou

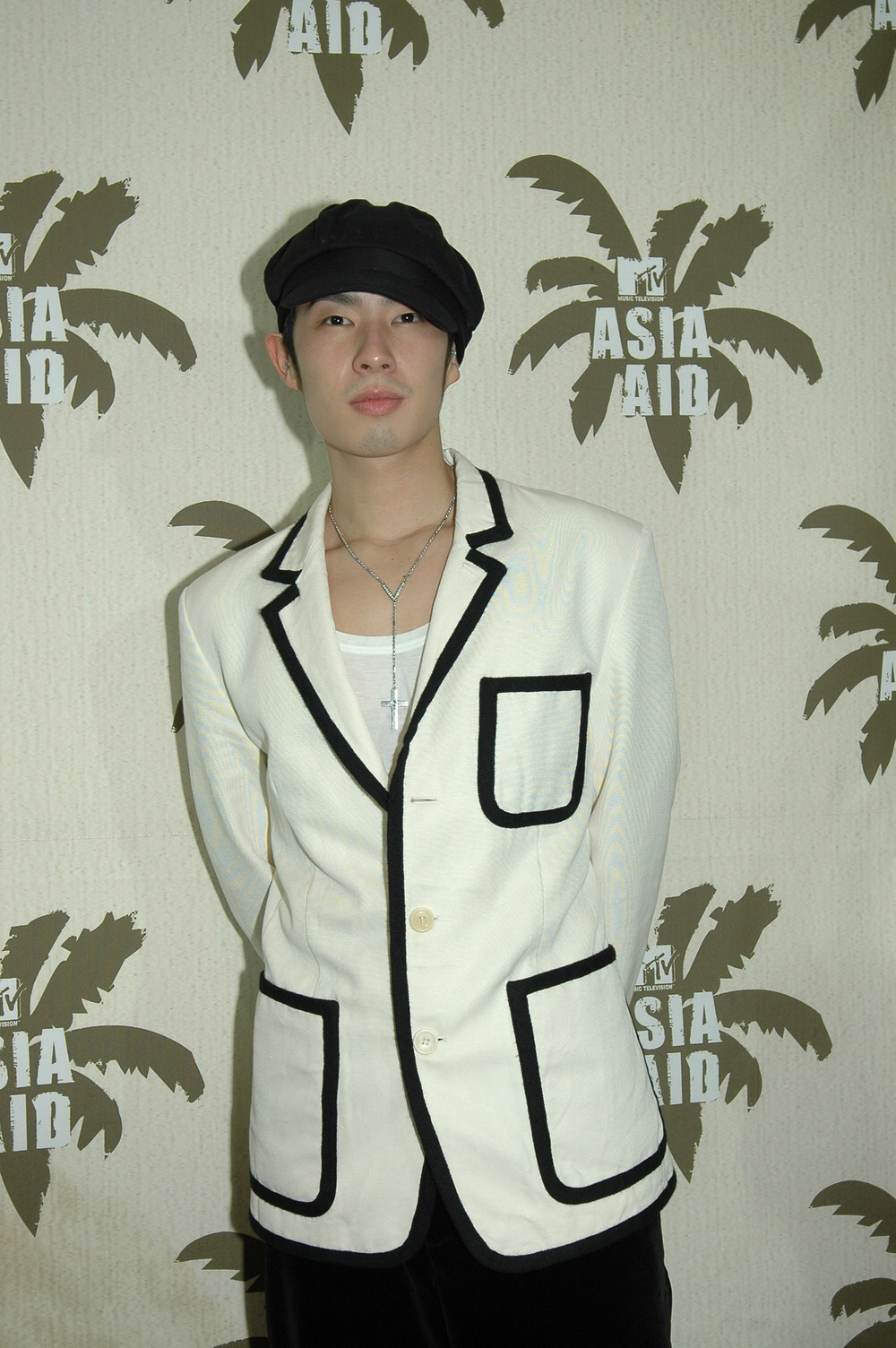
Vanness Wu

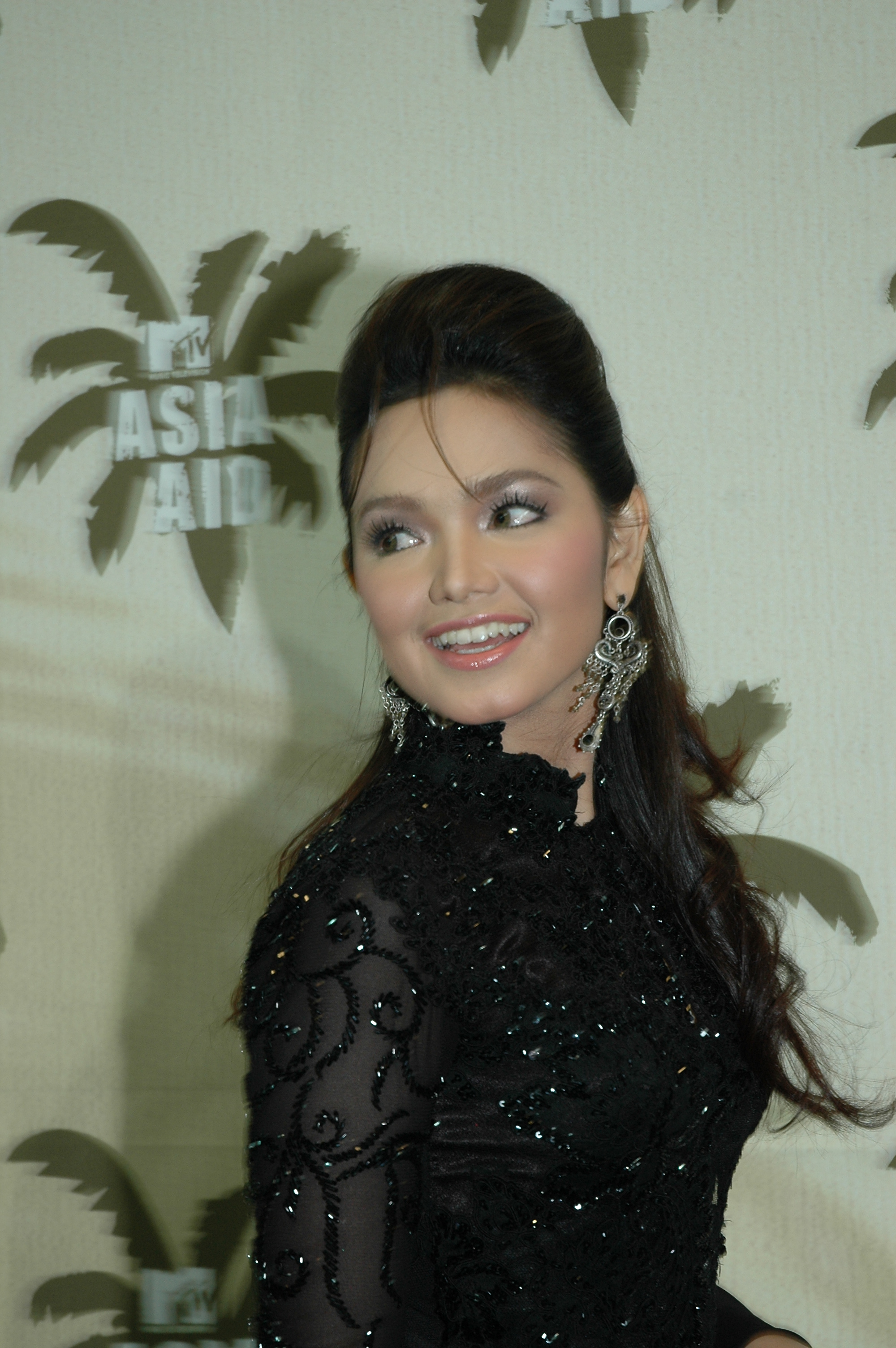
Siti Nurhaliza

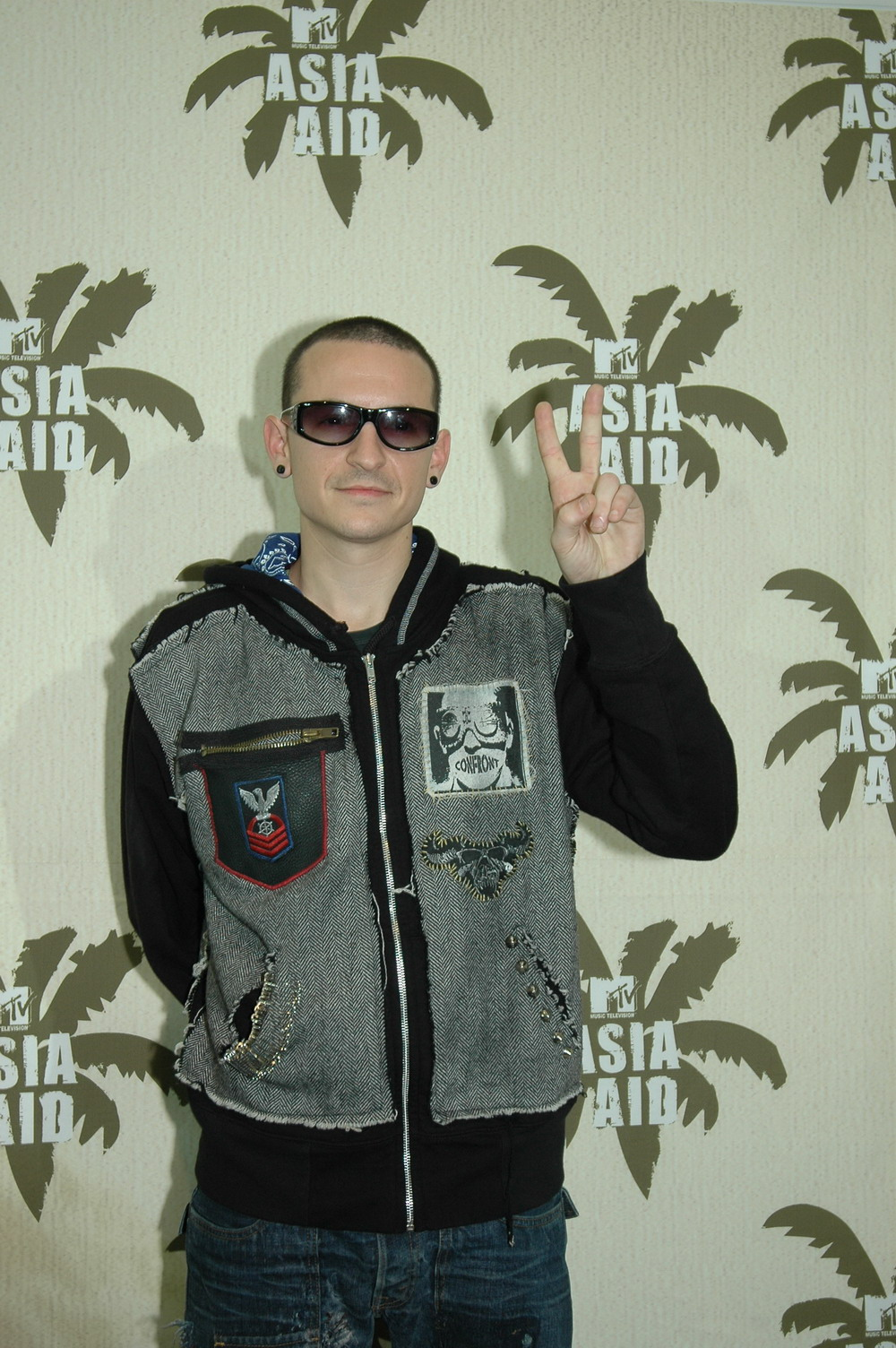
Chester Bennington
