= MTV Asia Awards 2003 =

- Date: January 24, 2003
- Location: Singapore Indoor Stadium, Singapore
- Hosted by: Shaggy and Coco Lee

The MTV Asia Awards 2003 was held on January 24, 2003, at the Singapore Indoor Stadium in Singapore. The event was the second edition of the MTV Asia Awards, and was hosted by Shaggy and Coco Lee. Performers included Avril Lavigne, Missy Elliott, Robbie Williams, Blue and Stefanie Sun. Mastercard, Nokia, Toyota along with Panasonic co-sponsored for the 2nd MTV Asia Awards.

Nominees in each category are listed alphabetically, winners are bolded.

== International awards ==
=== Favorite Pop Act ===
- A1
- **Blue**
- Destiny's Child
- No Doubt
- Westlife

=== Favorite Rock Act ===
- Coldplay
- Creed
- **Linkin Park**
- Oasis
- Red Hot Chili Peppers

=== Favorite Video ===
- Britney Spears — "I Love Rock 'n' Roll"
- Coldplay — "In My Place"
- Eminem — "Without Me"
- Kylie Minogue — "Can't Get You Out of My Head"
- **Linkin Park — "Pts.OF.Athrty"**

=== Favorite Female Artist ===
- **Avril Lavigne**
- Kylie Minogue
- Jennifer Lopez
- Pink
- Shakira

=== Favorite Male Artist ===
- Eminem
- Enrique Iglesias
- Moby
- **Robbie Williams**
- Ronan Keating

=== Favorite Breakthrough Artist ===
- **Avril Lavigne**
- Blue
- Michelle Branch
- Norah Jones
- Shakira

== Regional awards ==
=== Favorite Artist Mainland China ===
- Man Wenjun
- Man Jiang
- Sun Yue
- Lao Lang
- **Yu Quan**

=== Favorite Artist Hong Kong ===
- Eason Chan
- Kelly Chen
- **Sammi Cheng**
- Twins
- Miriam Yeung

=== Favorite Artist India ===
- **A. R. Rahman**
- Adnan Sami
- Alisha Chinai
- Bombay Vikings
- Instant Karma

=== Favorite Artist Indonesia ===
- **Cokelat**
- Dewa
- Iwan Fals
- Slank
- Sheila on 7

=== Favorite Artist Korea ===
- BoA
- G.o.d
- **JtL**
- Kangta
- Shinhwa

=== Favorite Artist Malaysia ===
- Ella
- Exists
- Liza Hanim
- OAG
- **Siti Nurhaliza**

=== Favorite Artist Philippines ===
- Aiza Seguerra
- Ogie Alcasid
- Parokya ni Edgar
- **Regine Velasquez**
- Slapshock

=== Favorite Artist Singapore ===
- A-do
- Ho Yeow Sun
- Kit Chan
- **Stefanie Sun**
- Urban Xchange

=== Favorite Artist Taiwan ===
- A-mei
- Elva Hsiao
- **Jay Chou**
- S.H.E
- David Tao

=== Favorite Artist Thailand ===
- **D2B**
- Palmy
- Peter Corp Dyrendal
- Silly Fools
- Soul After Six

== Special awards ==
=== Asian Film Award ===
- Devdas

=== The Style Award ===
- Avril Lavigne

Bipasha Basu

=== The Inspiration Award ===
- F4
