= MTV Asia Awards 2004 =

Music awards ceremony in Singapore

- Date: February 14, 2004
- Location: Singapore Indoor Stadium, Singapore
- Hosted by: Vanness Wu and Michelle Branch

The MTV Asia Awards 2004 in Singapore was hosted by Vanness Wu and Michelle Branch. It was held on February 14, 2004 at the Singapore Indoor Stadium.

Nominees in each category are listed alphabetically, winners are bolded.

== International awards ==
=== Favorite Pop Act ===
- Black Eyed Peas
- **Blue**
- Matchbox Twenty
- Simple Plan
- T.A.T.u.

=== Favorite Rock Act ===
- Audioslave
- Evanescence
- **Linkin Park**
- Metallica
- Radiohead

=== Favorite Video ===
- Christina Aguilera — "Beautiful"
- Coldplay — "The Scientist"
- Justin Timberlake — "Cry Me a River"
- **Linkin Park — "Somewhere I Belong"**
- Radiohead — "There There"

=== Favorite Female Artist ===
- Beyoncé
- **Christina Aguilera**
- Dido
- Jennifer Lopez
- Michelle Branch

=== Favorite Male Artist ===
- Eminem
- **Gareth Gates**
- Justin Timberlake
- Ricky Martin
- Robbie Williams

=== Favorite Breakthrough Artist ===
- 50 Cent
- Evanescence
- Sean Paul
- Stacie Orrico
- **T.A.T.u.**

== Regional awards ==
=== Favorite Artist Mainland China ===
- Han Hong
- Li Quan
- **Pu Shu**
- Si Qin Ge Ri Le
- Sun Nan

=== Favorite Artist Hong Kong ===
- Andy Lau
- Eason Chan
- Hacken Lee
- Joey Yung
- **Sammi Cheng**

=== Favorite Artist India ===
- **Abhijeet**
- Falguni Pathak
- Rekha Bhardwaj
- Shweta Shetty
- Vaishali Samant

=== Favorite Artist Indonesia ===
- Ari Lasso
- **Audy**
- Cokelat
- Iwan Fals
- Mocca

=== Favorite Artist Korea ===
- **BoA**
- Fly to the Sky
- Lee Hyori
- Wheesung
- Seven

=== Favorite Artist Malaysia ===
- Jamal Abdillah
- Misha Omar
- Siti Sarah
- **Siti Nurhaliza**
- Too Phat

=== Favorite Artist Philippines ===
- Barbie's Cradle
- Ogie Alcasid
- **Parokya ni Edgar**
- Regine Velasquez
- Rivermaya

=== Favorite Artist Singapore ===
- A-do
- Ayden
- **Stefanie Sun**
- Ho Yeow Sun
- Tanya Chua

=== Favorite Artist Taiwan ===
- **A-mei**
- David Tao
- Jay Chou
- Jolin Tsai
- S.H.E

=== Favorite Artist Thailand ===
- Armchair
- Blackhead
- Boyd Kosiyabong
- Parn Thanaporn
- **Thongchai McIntyre**

== Special awards ==
=== Asian Film Award ===
- Michelle Yeoh

=== Most Influential Artist Award ===
- BoA

=== The Inspiration Award ===
- Anita Mui

=== Lifetime Achievement Award ===
- Mariah Carey (presented by boy band Blue)
