= MTV Asia Awards 2006 =

- Date: May 6, 2006
- Location: Royal Paragon Hall, Bangkok, Thailand
- Hosted by: Wang Leehom, Kelly Rowland

The MTV Asia Awards 2006 was held at the Siam Paragon in Bangkok, Thailand. The show aired live on Saturday, May 6 across Asian MTV channels. Like previous award shows, the show is best known for live performances featuring collaborations of Eastern and Western act. The show was hosted by Wang Leehom together with Kelly Rowland replacing Kelly Clarkson.

Nominees in each category are listed alphabetically, winners are bolded.

== Performers ==
- Korn
- Wang Leehom
- Kelly Rowland
- Thaitanium & Simon Webbe
- Lee Ryan & Tata Young
- Jolin Tsai
- Daniel Powter
- Teriyaki Boyz
- Hoobastank
- Rivermaya
- Kangta & Vanness

== Presenters ==
- Zhao Wei
- Maggie Q
- Same Same
- Taufik Batisah
- Too Phat
- Lukkade Metinee
- Sean Noh
- The Veronicas
- Ahli Fiqir
- Peter Corp
- Marsha Vadhanapanich
- Jal
- Chang Chen

== International awards ==
=== Favorite Pop Act ===
- Black Eyed Peas
- Gorillaz
- Simple Plan
- **Backstreet Boys**
- Westlife

=== Favorite Rock Act ===
- Coldplay
- Franz Ferdinand
- **Green Day**
- My Chemical Romance
- Oasis

=== Favorite Video ===
- Franz Ferdinand — "Do You Want To"
- Green Day — "Wake Me Up When September Ends"
- Kanye West — "Gold Digger"
- **Korn — "Twisted Transistor"**
- My Chemical Romance — "Helena"

=== Favorite Female Artist ===
- Ashlee Simpson
- **Kelly Clarkson**
- Lindsay Lohan
- Madonna
- Mariah Carey

=== Favorite Male Artist ===
- Eminem
- James Blunt
- Kanye West
- **Ricky Martin**
- Robbie Williams

=== Favorite Breakthrough Artist ===
- Fort Minor
- James Blunt
- **Simon Webbe**
- The Pussycat Dolls
- My Chemical Romance

== Regional awards ==
=== Favorite Artist Mainland China ===
- The Flower
- Sun Nan
- **Zhao Wei**
- Xu Wei
- Zhou Xun

=== Favorite Artist Hong Kong ===
- Andy Lau
- Eason Chan
- Joey Yung
- Leo Ku
- **Twins**

=== Favorite Artist India ===
- Abhijeet Sawant
- Asha Bhosle
- **Jal**
- Rabbi Shergill
- Sonu Nigam

=== Favorite Artist Indonesia ===
- Maliq & D'Essentials
- **Peterpan**
- Project Pop
- Radja
- Rossa

=== Favorite Artist Korea ===
- Buzz
- **Seven**
- SG Wannabe
- Tei
- Wheesung

=== Favorite Artist Malaysia ===
- Ahli Fiqir
- Fish Leong
- **Mawi**
- Ruffedge
- Too Phat

=== Favorite Artist Philippines ===
- Bamboo
- Hale
- Kitchie Nadal
- Orange and Lemons
- **Rivermaya**

=== Favorite Artist Singapore ===
- A-do
- Huang Yida
- JJ Lin
- **Taufik Batisah**
- Stefanie Sun

=== Favorite Artist Taiwan ===
- 5566
- Jay Chou
- Jolin Tsai
- S.H.E
- **Wang Leehom**

=== Favorite Artist Thailand ===
- 4gotten
- Bodyslam
- Lydia
- **Tata Young**
- Thaitanium

== Special awards ==
=== The Style Award ===
- Jolin Tsai

=== Outstanding Achievement in Popular Music ===
- Destiny's Child

=== The Inspiration Award ===
- Thongchai McIntyre

=== Breakthrough Collaboration Japan Award ===
- Teriyaki Boyz

== Award theme ==
The award had a futuristic Asian looks. Soldiers with (fake) laser guns would escort presenters onto the stage. After each commercial break there were animation skits set in a future Asia.

== Gallery ==
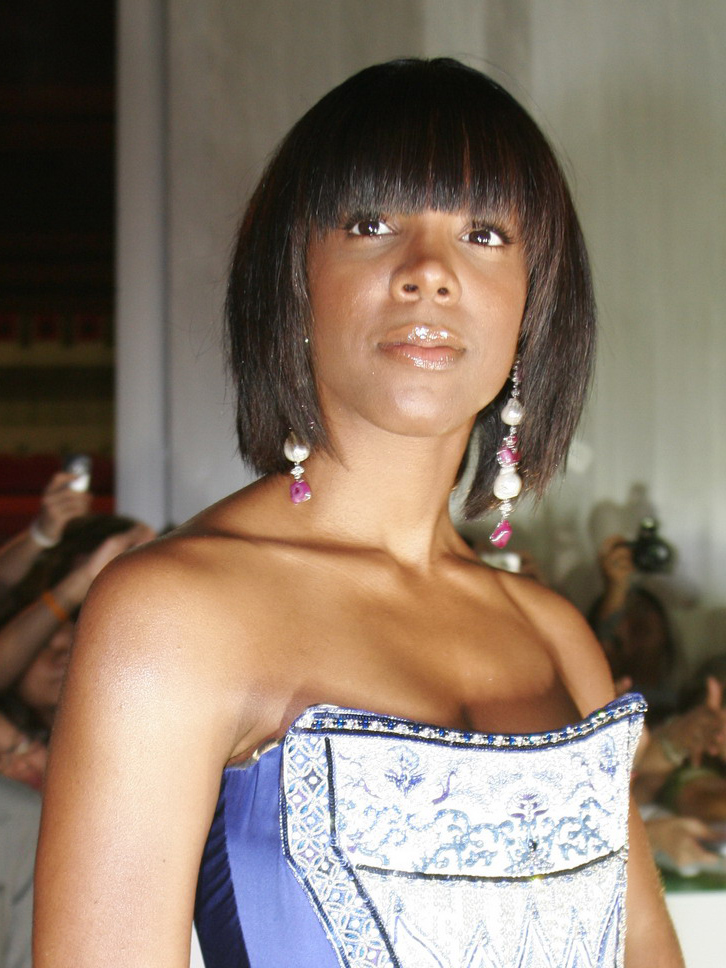
Kelly Rowland, host

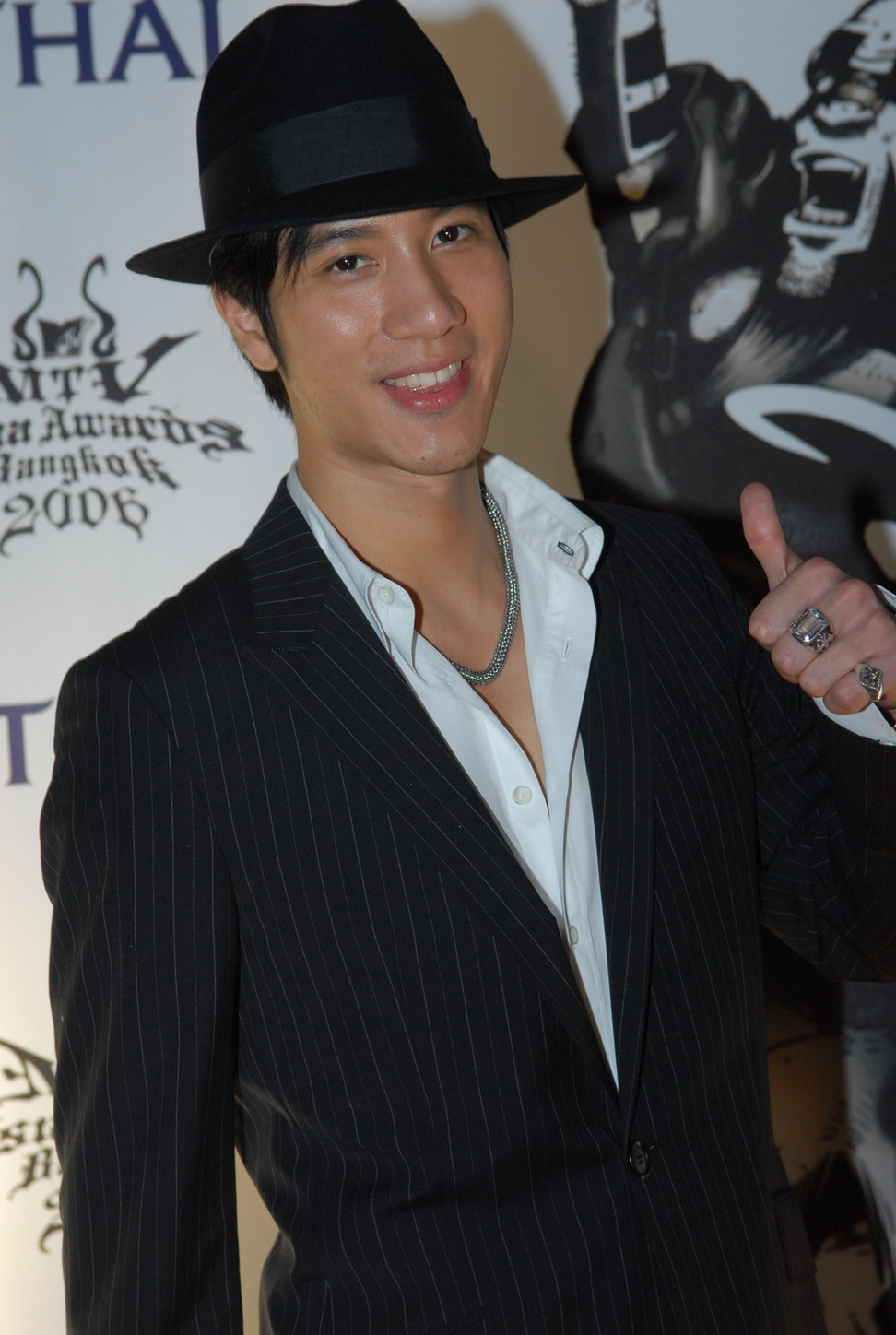
Wang Leehom, host

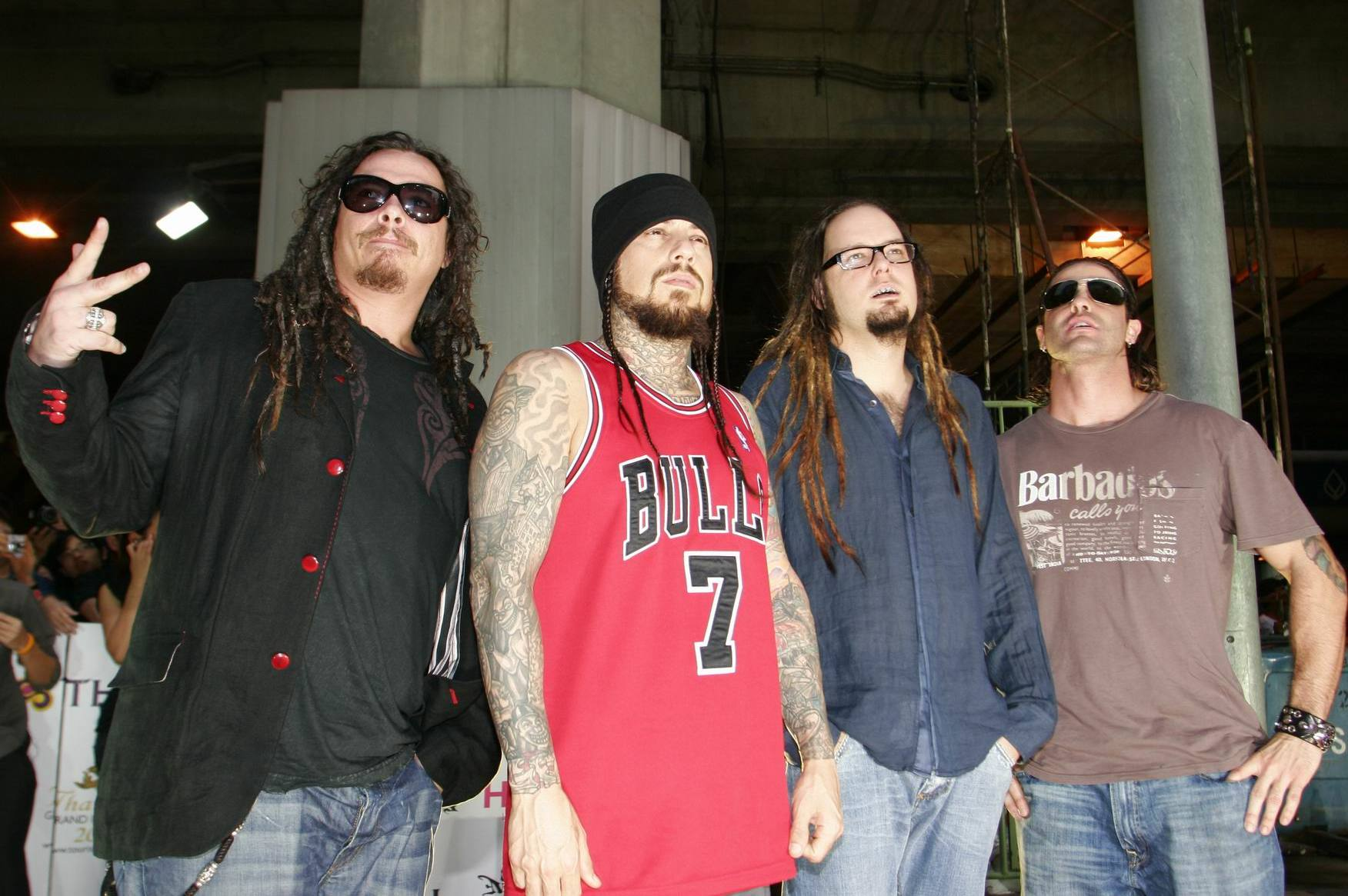
Korn

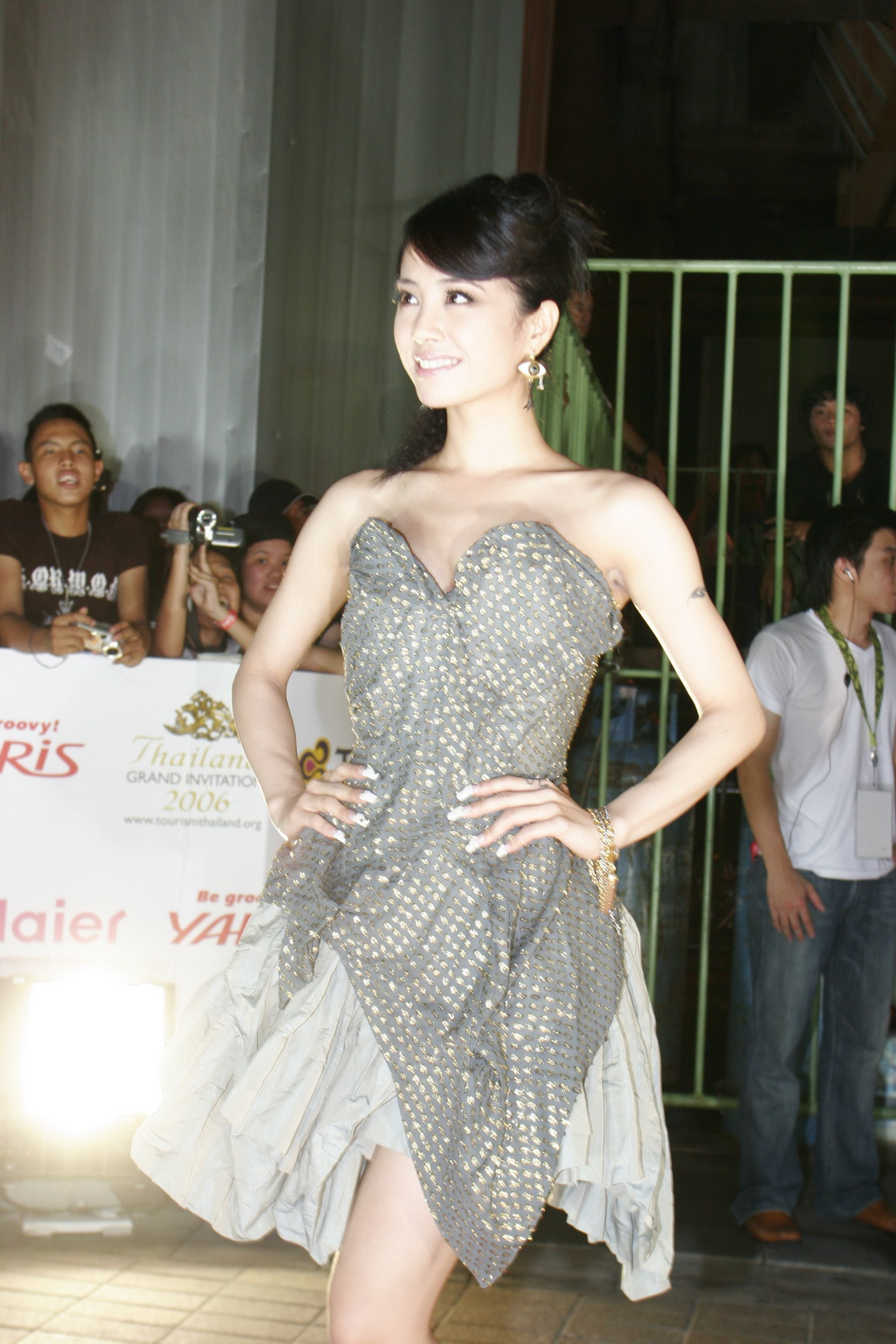
Jolin Tsai

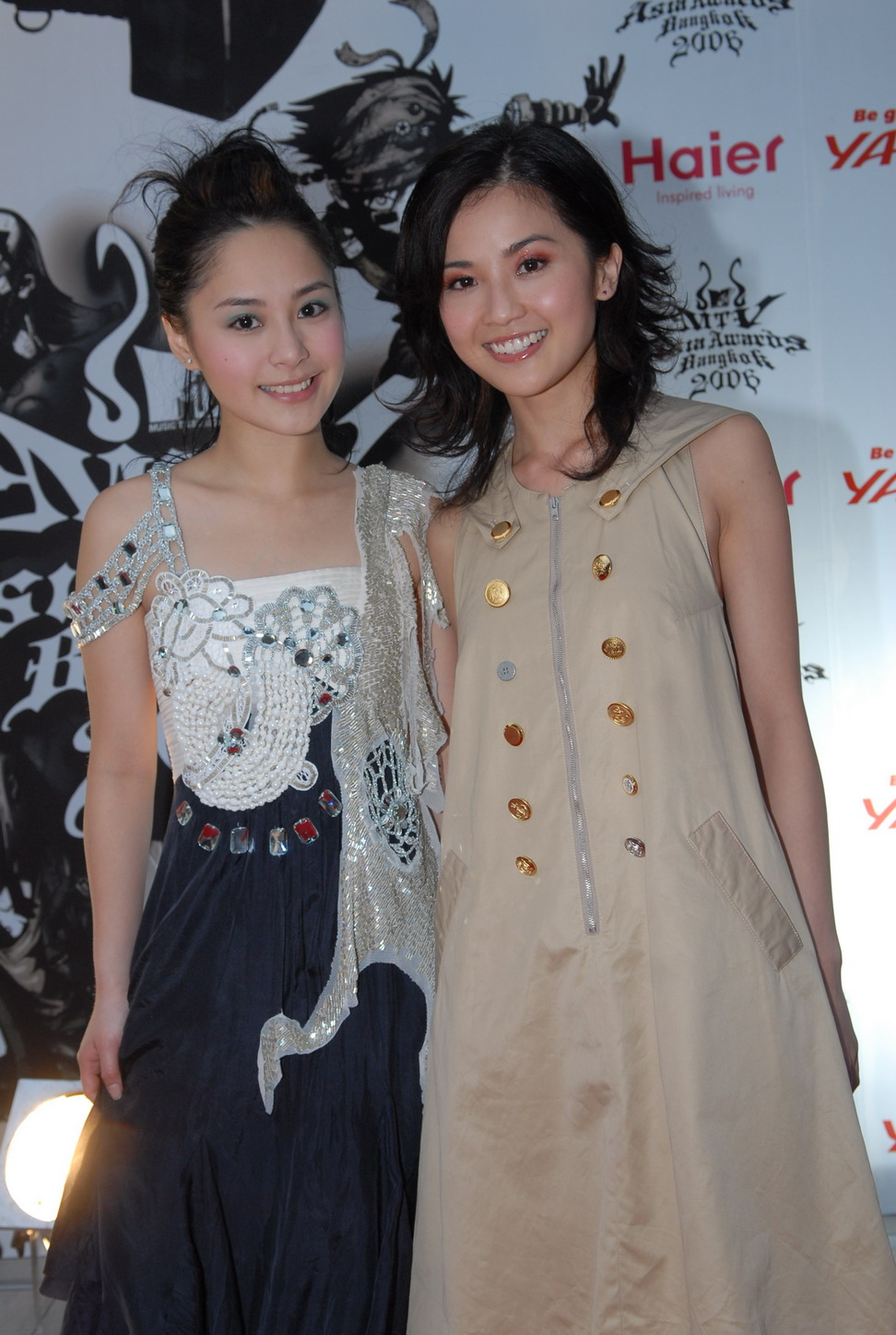
Twins

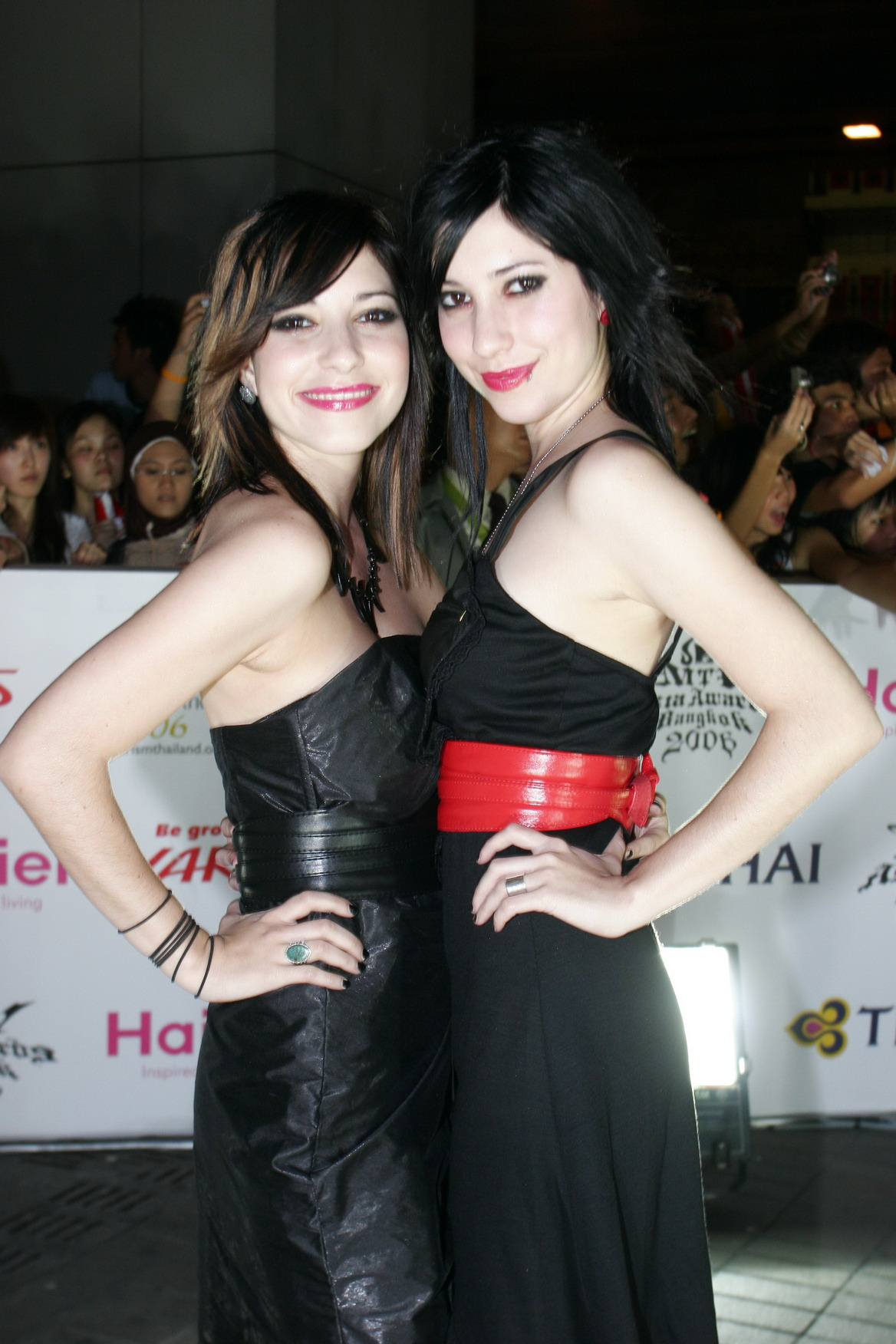
The Veronicas

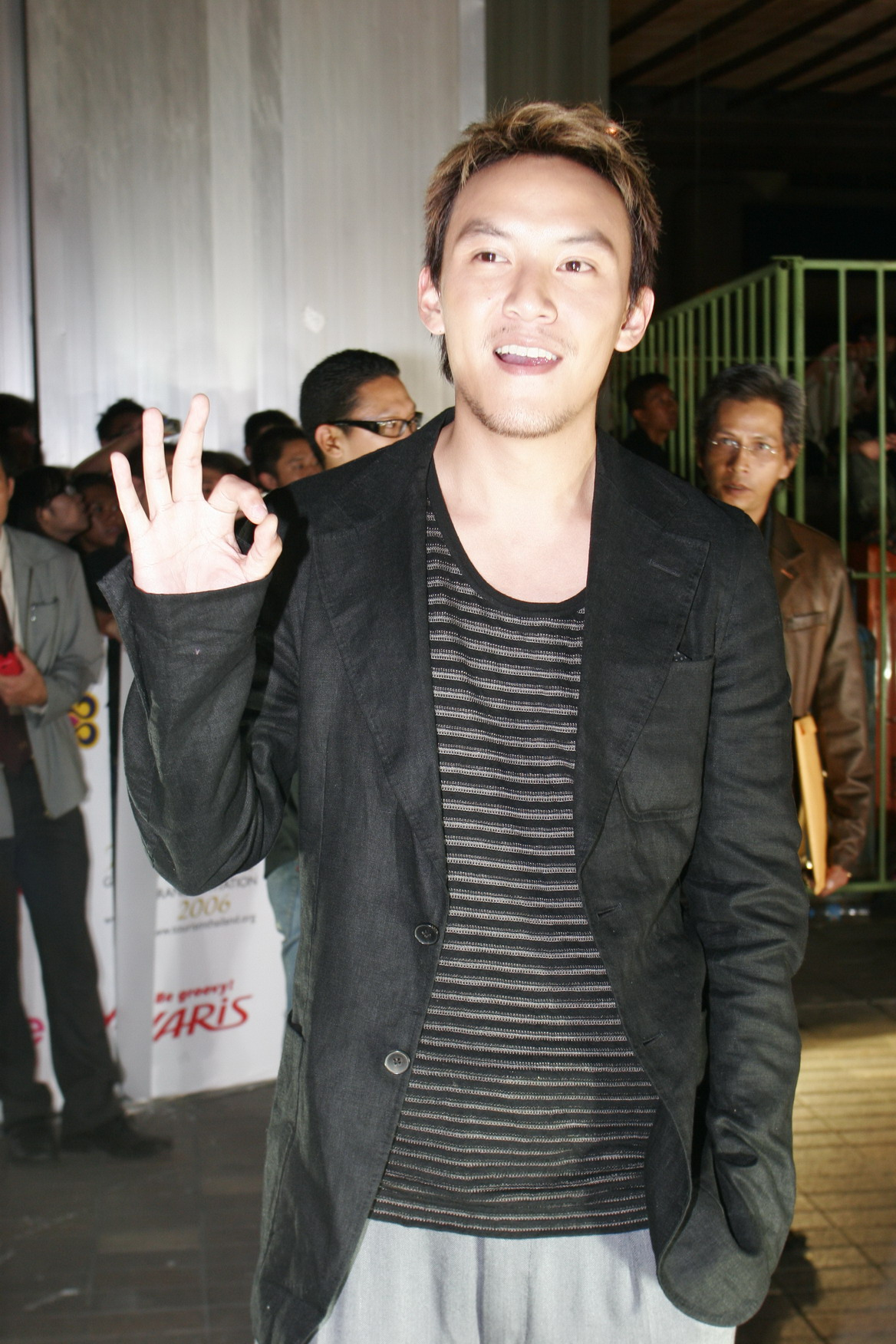
Chang Chen

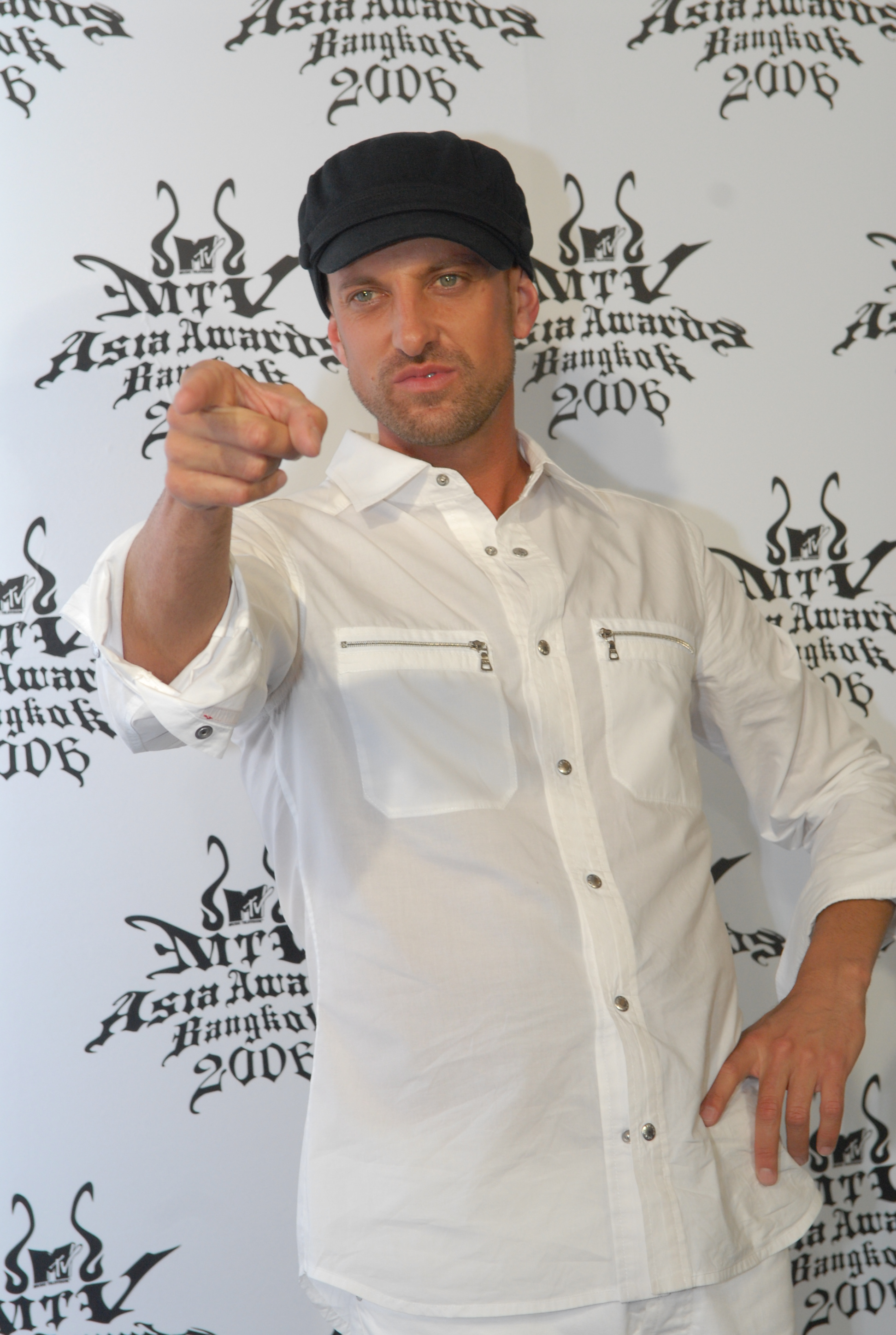
Daniel Powter

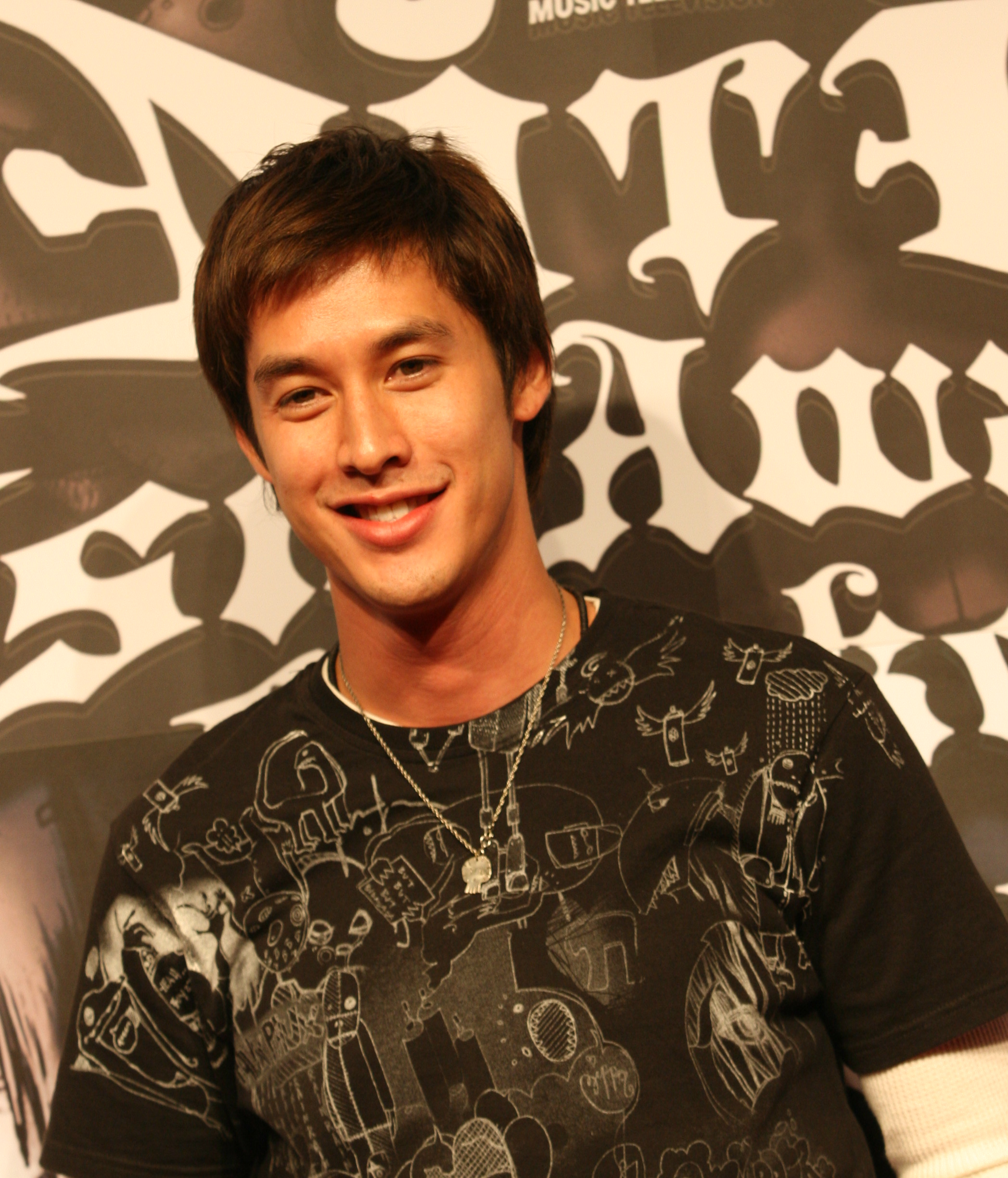
Utt Panichkul

== See also ==
- MTV
- MTV Asia Awards
- MTV Asia
