= MTV Asia Awards 2002 =

- Date: February 2, 2002
- Location: Singapore Indoor Stadium, Singapore
- Hosted by: Mandy Moore and Ronan Keating

The MTV Asia Awards 2002 in Singapore hosted by Mandy Moore and Ronan Keating. It was held on February 2, 2002. This was the first edition of the MTV Asia Awards.

Nominees in each category are listed alphabetically, winners are bolded.

== International awards ==
=== Favorite Pop Act ===
- Backstreet Boys
- Destiny's Child
- M2M
- *NSYNC
- **Westlife**

=== Favorite Rock Act ===
- **Bon Jovi**
- Coldplay
- Limp Bizkit
- Linkin Park
- U2

=== Favorite Video ===
- **Backstreet Boys — "The Call"**
- Christina Aguilera, Lil' Kim, Mýa & Pink — "Lady Marmalade"
- Fatboy Slim — "Weapon of Choice"
- Gorillaz — "19-2000"
- *NSYNC — "Pop"

=== Favorite Female Artist ===
- **Britney Spears**
- Christina Aguilera
- Jennifer Lopez
- Madonna
- Mariah Carey

=== Favorite Male Artist ===
- Eminem
- **Ricky Martin**
- Robbie Williams
- Ronan Keating
- Shaggy

=== Favorite Breakthrough Artist ===
- Alicia Keys
- Coldplay
- Gorillaz
- **Linkin Park**
- Nelly Furtado

=== Favorite Movie ===
- Charlie's Angels
- **Crouching Tiger, Hidden Dragon**
- Pearl Harbor
- Rush Hour 2
- Shrek
- The Mummy Returns

=== Favorite Fashion Designer ===
- **Donatella Versace**
- John Galliano
- Marc Jacobs
- Miu Miu
- Stella McCartney
- Tom Ford

== Regional awards ==
=== Favorite Artist Mainland China ===
- Han Hong
- **Na Ying**
- Sun Nan
- Ye Pei
- Yu Quan

=== Favorite Artist Hong Kong ===
- Andy Lau
- Jacky Cheung
- Kelly Chen
- Nicholas Tse
- **Sammi Cheng**

=== Favorite Artists India ===
- Falguni Pathak
- Lucky Ali
- Mehnaz Hoosein
- Sagarika
- **Shaan**

=== Favorite Artist Indonesia ===
- Dewa
- Jamrud
- Krisdayanti
- **Padi**
- Sheila on 7

=== Favorite Artist Korea ===
- **Kangta**
- Fin.K.L
- g.o.d
- Shinhwa
- Yoo Seung-jun

=== Favorite Artist Malaysia ===
- S. M. Salim
- M. Nasir
- Too Phat
- **Siti Nurhaliza**
- Ziana Zain

=== Favorite Artist Philippines ===
- Freestyle
- Gary Valenciano
- Lea Salonga
- Martin Nievera
- **Regine Velasquez**

=== Favorite Artist Singapore ===
- Dreamz FM
- Kit Chan
- **Stefanie Sun**
- Stella Ng
- Tanya Chua

=== Favorite Artist Thailand ===
- Dome
- Marsha
- **Pru**
- Tata Young
- Thongchai McIntyre

=== Favorite Artist Taiwan ===
- **A-mei**
- Elva Hsiao
- Jay Chou
- Mayday
- Wu Bai

== Special awards ==
=== The Inspiration Award ===
- Jackie Chan

=== Most Influential Artist Award ===
- Ayumi Hamasaki
