= T.A.T.u. Remixes =

t.A.T.u. Remixes
- International Cover

Remix album by t.A.T.u.
- Released: September 26, 2003
- Genre: Dance
- Length: 64:08
- Languages: English; Russian
- Label: Interscope
- Producers: Ivan Shapovalov; Trevor Horn; Martin Kierszenbaum; Robert Orton

t.A.T.u. chronology
| 200 km/h in the Wrong Lane (2002) | t.A.T.u. Remixes (2003) | Dangerous and Moving (2005) |

Alternative cover
- Russian Edition, 2 CDs + DVD

t.A.T.u. Remixes, or simply Remixes, is an official compilation of remixes from t.A.T.u. The album features remixes from 200 Po Vstrechnoy as well as from 200 km/h in the Wrong Lane and some new remixes. The Russian release included one CD format, other one includes two CDs and one DVD that featured music videos, video remixes and live performances, however, other releases did not include an extra CD or DVD.

There were two singles from the album; "Prostye Dvizhenia" and "Ne Ver', Ne Boysia". "Prostye Dvizhenia" was released first. The song did not chart in any country, and the official release was cancelled, due to the lack of promotion of the single. To date, this album marks the only commercial release of "Prostye Dvizheniya".

"Ne Ver, Ne Boysia, Ne Prosi" was released as a single as well. The song was used for the Eurovision Song Contest in 2003. The group represented Russia in Riga, Latvia. The group were placed third. A music video was released on their official YouTube account. The song was also used on their greatest hits album The Best (2006).

== Track listing ==
Standard edition
| No. | Title | Lyrics | Music | Length |
|---|---|---|---|---|
| 1. | "All the Things She Said" (Blackpulke Remix) | Elena Kiper; Valery Polienko; Trevor Horn; Martin Kierszenbaum | Sergio Galoyan | 4:15 |
| 2. | "All the Things She Said" (MARK!'s Buzzin Mix) | Kiper; Polienko; Horn; Kierszenbaum | Galoyan | 8:14 |
| 3. | "All the Things She Said" (Running and Spinning Remix by Guena LG & RLS) | Kiper; Polienko; Horn; Kierszenbaum | Galoyan | 6:15 |
| 4. | "All the Things She Said" (Extension 119 Club Dub) | Kiper; Polienko; Horn; Kierszenbaum | Galoyan | 8:19 |
| 5. | "Not Gonna Get Us" (Larry Tee Electroclash Mix) | Kiper; Polienko; Horn | Galoyan | 6:21 |
| 6. | "Not Gonna Get Us" (Richard Morel's Pink Noise Vocal Mix) | Kiper; Polienko; Horn | Galoyan | 8:12 |
| 7. | "Not Gonna Get Us" (Thick Dick Vocal) | Kiper; Polienko; Horn | Galoyan | 7:14 |
| 8. | "Not Gonna Get Us" (Dave Audé's Velvet Dub) | Kiper; Polienko; Horn | Galoyan | 7:16 |
| 9. | "30 Minutes" (Extension 119 Club Vocal) | Polienko; Kierszenbaum | Galoyan; Ivan Shapovalov | 7:59 |
| Total length: | | | | 64:08 |

Standard edition enhancement
| No. | Title | Lyrics | Music | Length |
|---|---|---|---|---|
| 10. | "Not Gonna Get Us" (Remix Video) | Kiper; Polienko; Horn | Galoyan |

Japanese edition
| No. | Title | Lyrics | Music | Length |
|---|---|---|---|---|
| 1. | "All the Things She Said" (dJ Monk's After Skool Special) | Kiper; Polienko; Horn; Kierszenbaum | Galoyan | 7:07 |
| Total length: | | | | 66:59 |

Standard Russian & Ukraine edition
| No. | Title | Lyrics | Music | Length |
|---|---|---|---|---|
| 10. | "Простые Движения" (Prostye Dvizheniya) | Polienko | Mars Lasar; Shapovalov | 3:58 |
| 11. | "Не Верь, не бо́йся" (Ne Ver', Ne Boysia) | Polienko | Lasar; Shapovalov | 3:04 |
| Total length: | | | | 71:11 |

Russian edition – Disc 2
| No. | Title | Lyrics | Music | Length |
|---|---|---|---|---|
| 1. | "Я Сошла С Ума" (Ya Soshla S Uma) (HarDrum Remix) | Kiper; Polienko | Galoyan | 4:13 |
| 2. | "All the Things She Said" (HarDrum Remix) | Kiper; Polienko; Horn; Kierszenbaum | Galoyan | 4:12 |
| 3. | "Нас Не Догонят" (Nas Ne Dogonyat) (HarDrum Remix) | Kiper; Polienko | Galoyan | 3:52 |
| 4. | "30 Минут" (30 Minut) (HarDrum Remix) | Polienko | Galoyan; Shapovalov | 4:04 |
| 5. | "30 Минут" (30 Minut) (Naked Mix by Moscow Grooves Institute) | Polienko | Galoyan; Shapovalov | 5:16 |
| 6. | "30 Минут" (30 Minut) (RagaMix by That Black) | Polienko | Galoyan; Shapovalov | 5:54 |
| 7. | "Мальчик-Гей" (Malchik-Gey) (Fankymix by That Black) | Vadim Stepantsov; Anna Karaseva | Galoyan | 5:05 |
| 8. | "All the Things She Said" (Extension 119 Club Edit) | Kiper; Polienko; Horn; Kierszenbaum | Galoyan | 5:18 |
| 9. | "All the Things She Said" (DJ MONK's Breaks Mix) | Kiper; Polienko; Horn; Kierszenbaum | Galoyan | 6:06 |
| Total length: | | | | 44:02 |

- Also contains a photo gallery.

Russian edition DVD
| No. | Title | Lyrics | Music | Length |
|---|---|---|---|---|
| 1. | "Я Сошла С Ума" (Ya Soshla S Uma) | Kiper; Polienko | Galoyan | 3:47 |
| 2. | "Я Сошла С Ума" (Ya Soshla S Uma) (HarDrum Remix) | Kiper; Polienko | Galoyan | 4:04 |
| 3. | "Нас Не Догонят" (Nas Ne Dogonyat) | Kiper; Polienko | Galoyan | 3:58 |
| 4. | "30 Минут" (30 Minut) | Polienko | Galoyan; Shapovalov | 3:46 |
| 5. | "Простые Движения" (Prostye Dvizheniya) | Polienko | Lasar; Shapovalov | 4:10 |
| 6. | "All the Things She Said" | Kiper; Polienko; Horn; Kierszenbaum | Galoyan | 3:46 |
| 7. | "All the Things She Said" (Extension 119 Club Edit) | Kiper; Polienko; Horn; Kierszenbaum | Galoyan | 4:12 |
| 8. | "Not Gonna Get Us" | Kiper; Polienko; Horn | Galoyan | 3:59 |
| 9. | "Not Gonna Get Us" (Dave Audé Velvet Dub) | Kiper; Polienko; Horn | Galoyan | 3:54 |
| 10. | "30 Minutes" | Polienko; Kierszenbaum | Galoyan; Shapovalov | 3:43 |
| 11. | "How Soon Is Now?" | Morrissey | Johnny Marr | 3:17 |
| 12. | "Не Верь, Не Бойся" (Ne Ver', Ne Boysia) (Live at the 2003 Muz-TV Awards) | Polienko | Lasar; Shapovalov | 3:16 |
| 13. | "Нас Не Догонят" (Nas Ne Dogonyat) (Live at the 2003 Muz-TV Awards) | Kiper; Polienko | Galoyan | 4:22 |
| Total length: | | | | 50:14 |

== Charts ==
=== Weekly charts ===
Weekly chart performance for t.A.T.u. Remixes
| Chart (2003–2004) | Peak position |
|---|---|
| Japanese Albums (Oricon) | 105 |
| Russian Albums (NFPF) | 3 |

=== Monthly charts ===
Monthly charts for t.A.T.u. Remixes
| Chart (2003–2004) | Peak position |
|---|---|
| Russian Albums (NFPF) | 3 |
| South Korean International Albums (MIAK) | 12 |

== Certifications ==
| Region | Certification | Certified units/sales |
|---|---|---|
| Russia (NFPF) | Gold | 50,000^{*} |
| South Korea | — | 5,788 |
^{*} Sales figures based on certification alone.
