= 200 km/h in the Wrong Lane =

Studio album by t.A.T.u.
- Released: 7 October 2002
- Recorded: 2002
- Genres: Pop rock; electronic; Europop
- Length: 48:17
- Languages: English; Russian
- Labels: Universal; Interscope
- Producers: Trevor Horn; Martin Kierszenbaum; Robert Orton; Ivan Shapovalov (exec.)

t.A.T.u. chronology
200 Po Vstrechnoy (2001)	200 km/h in the Wrong Lane (2002)	t.A.T.u. Remixes (2003)

Alternative cover
- East Slavic cover

Alternative cover
- 10th Anniversary Edition cover

Singles from 200 km/h in the Wrong Lane
- 1. "All the Things She Said" Released: 13 August 2002; 2. "Not Gonna Get Us" Released: 3 February 2003; 3. "How Soon Is Now?" Released: 23 May 2003

200 km/h in the Wrong Lane (also titled t.A.T.u. in Japan) is the second studio album and debut English language album by Russian music duo t.A.T.u. It was first released on 7 October 2002 in Europe, then on 10 December 2002 in North America, by Interscope Records. It is the duo's first studio album to be associated with Interscope after signing to Universal in 2001. Due to the duo's lack of English vocabulary, the album was produced and written by producers such as Trevor Horn, Martin Kierszenbaum, Sergio Galoyan, Robert Orton and Ivan Shapovalov, who was placed as the duo's manager and executive producer. 200 km/h lyrically explores themes such as teenage rebellion, love, sexuality, sadness, independence and social rebellion.

The album received mixed reviews from contemporary music critics. Many critics praised the catchiness and production standards, while ambivalent towards the duo's imagery and vocals. Upon its release, it debuted inside the top-ten in many European countries including Denmark, Austria, Finland, and Italy. It became the duo's best-selling album on the US Billboard 200, peaking at 13. The album became the highest selling album in Russia, with estimated shipments of one million copies. t.A.T.u. went on to promote the album with their Show Me Love Tour.

One of the three official singles, "All the Things She Said", became one of the most successful singles of the 2000s, charting at the top spot in over 20 countries. The song was responsible for bringing the group to the spotlight, particularly with the accompanying music video, which caused international controversy. The following singles, "Not Gonna Get Us" and "How Soon Is Now?", charted moderately worldwide. The album was the first by a Russian act to chart in many countries, and the second to chart on the US Billboard 200, following Gorky Park in 1989.

== Background ==
Prior to t.A.T.u., Yulia Volkova and Lena Katina had auditioned as members of Neposedi, a Russian children's theater-atelier. Shapolavov has said the two girls stood out from the rest of those that auditioned; however, 14-year-old Katina was initially the only one chosen for the group. She sang "It Must Have Been Love" and later recorded a demo release of "Yugoslavia" for the 1999 NATO bombing of Yugoslavia. Later though, Shapolalov decided he wanted to create a duo, and 14-year old Volkova was recruited. When both Katina and Volkova were cast for the group (under the name 'Taty'), they began to record their first album. Then, in 2001 the duo released "200 Po Vstrechnoy", which became successful in Eastern Europe. Producer Alexander Voitinskyi left while the album was in production, delaying the release. However, Shapolavov later signed Elena Kiper as the new co-producer and co-writer for the album. With the success, Shapovalov decided to sign the duo to Interscope and its parent Universal at the headquarters in Russia.

The duo started recording the album at Trevor Horn's home studio in London and having some recording sessions in Los Angeles. When the duo were signed and ready for recording, both Volkova and Katina felt it was easy to understand the English language. Volkova stated that Martin Kierszenbaum helped her with pronunciation, while Katina was already speaking English before production of the album. However, during the times recording in studios, Volkova constantly lost her voice.

== Recording ==
Katina commented on the collaborations, saying; "It was great [...] I think he [Martin Kierszenbaum] was involved in some translations because we wanted to keep the meaning of the songs, and to keep the structure specifics. I think that Martin is a little bit of a fan of t.A.T.u, so he was really trying hard to make us big everywhere! We had an opportunity to work with great producer, it was valuable experience. I am talking about Trevor Horn. And in general, just imagine: Two girls are coming from Russia, which is another world compared to the USA, working with a high class producers and writers and management. Everybody is so professional. Working with Martin and Interscope in general brought us to an absolutely different level."

== Composition ==
The music of 200 km/h in the Wrong Lane is derived from a wide variety of pop and dance genres while heavily incorporating different musical styles not being present on their previous Russian record. It encompasses a broad variety of genres, such as electronic, rock, industrial and Eurodance. It is considered that the album is a departure to their Russian debut, because that contained heavy Europop, Eurodance and techno influences.

The first track, "Not Gonna Get Us" is a Eurodance-inspired song, with influences of dance-pop and rock. "All the Things She Said" was the first single released and the second track on the album. The line "I'm in serious shit, I feel totally lost" in the first verse would be sung normally in live performance; on the album, however, the word is censored and was completely removed in the music video. The third single, "Show Me Love", was released in Poland. The song was described as "neutral". "30 Minutes" was later released as the fourth single. The song has been described as a "slow atmospheric ballad".

A cover of "How Soon Is Now?", originally by The Smiths, was the duo's last single released from this album, and was also the fifth track. The song "is transformed by scorched synths, furious power-chords and Katina or Volkova's defiant roar "You Shut Your Mouth", into an angry punka blast." "Clowns (Can You See Me Now?)" was the sixth track on the album. The song was written by Horn, Ivan Shapolavov and Valery Polienko. It was also scheduled to be the last single, but this plan was scrapped. However, for a promotional release, 200km/h in the Wrong Lane was re-issued in their native Russia under the name t.A.T.u. – Clowns. It has a synthpop and electronica style. "Malchik Gay" (translated to: Gay Boy) is the seventh track on the album. AllMusic named it as an album highlight because the lyrics, which were written by their producers, had received a lot of attention. It is an acoustic song concerning homosexuality. "Stars" is the eighth and final original track on the album. The song "tries for smooth world-pop with an extended Russian rap, but doesn't linger in anyone's memory after it's over."

== Title and artwork ==
The album's title was revealed as 200 km/h in the Wrong Lane. In a documentary on their DVD Screaming for More, the group revealed that the title of the album was to represent their imagery that was portrayed through the media and that the album represented a "dangerous" side to them.

Photography for the cover was done by Sheryl Nields. There are three official covers to the album. The international version featured both Volkova and Katina leaning on a motorbike, with Katina leaning on Volkova. The Russian version features the duo in school uniforms embracing and implied to be kissing, though with their faces not visible. The Japanese cover also shows the duo in school uniforms. The 10th Anniversary Edition partially takes the artwork from the "All the Things She Said" single cover, and uses the group's music videos to illustrate the border of the cover.

== Promotion ==
=== Media portrayal ===
The music video of "All the Things She Said" was released in August 2002. The kiss between the duo was an immediately controversial, with many media outlets calling it one of the most controversial videos ever made. Media outlets, including MuchMusic, FHM Music TV, Virgin Media and The Guardian have regarded it as either a "sexy" or "controversial" music video. William Leith from The Guardian wrote an article on "how lesbianism never fails to appeal upon men", commenting that; "the BBC ban on tATu's video, the fact that their manager, Ivan Shapovalov, has said some dodgy things about his marketing strategies, and that Richard and Judy have advised people not to buy the record. But the thing that really starts the conversation going is the mention of lesbianism."

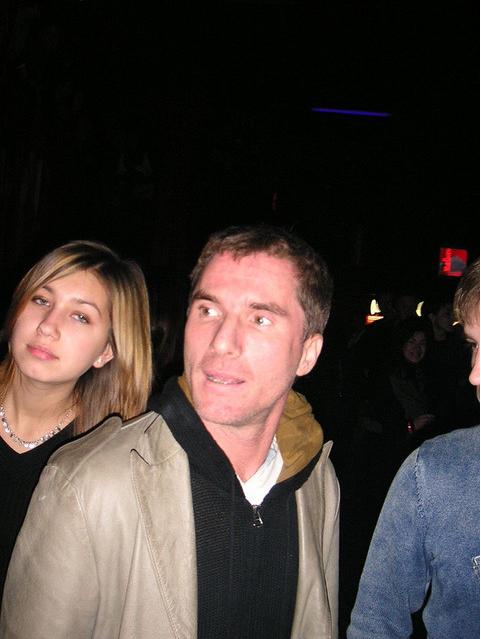
t.A.T.u. manager Ivan Shapovalov would be targeted for the band's sexualized image.

After their manager admitted to portraying the girls as lesbians to market their music and aimed t.A.T.u. to create a sexual imagery for men who enjoy pornography, media outlets had criticized him and t.A.T.u. Child safety charity Kidscape branded the group "disgusting and pathetic". ITV banned the video from its show CD:UK, as producer Tammy Hoyle responded "We could not show the video on CD:UK because it is not really suitable for children." Despite banning the video, the group performed the song on many live performances including MTV and Top of the Pops. A writer from The Daily Telegraph expressed the video as "clichéd", while it "titillating on a very base and adolescent level, only serves to cheapen the song's lyrical impact. The video is also a sign of how blurred the line between entertainment and exploitation has become".

=== Tour ===
The group's Show Me Love Tour was originally commenced in early 2003. In March 2003, the group announced dates for their "Show Me Love Promo Tour" in the United Kingdom. However the next month, the group dropped the dates and did not perform at the concert, due to poor ticket sales, just days before the scheduled concerts. TBBC News stated that only a fraction of the tickets were sold for the concert and said the stadiums (held in London and Manchester) had around capacities of 10,000. A spokesman from their label Interscope gave no details for why the cancellation took place.

In May 2003, t.A.T.u.'s management were sued by the promoters EEM Group for the cancellations of the concerts. EEM sued their management for £300,000, claiming they put "unachievable and numerous obstacles" in the way of ticket sales for the shows. They also claimed that Yulia's illness was a reason for the cancellation, however due to the lack of evidence, the lawsuit was discarded. After the lawsuit, the group also cancelled their Asian-promo tour for Japan and China, due to Yulia's sickness, who needed urgent surgery. The same month, the group postponed their German Promo tour, due to a late invitation to the 2003 MTV Movie Awards, where they performed. The following month they also cancelled their Riga concert and Japan concert in June, which led to a lawsuit from Pasadena Group Promotion, asking $180,000 in damages, as they did not receive any official letters regarding the cancellation.

==== Dates ====
Date (2003)	City	Country	Venue
11 February	Hradec Králové	Czech Republic	Zimní Stadion
13 February	Brno	Czech Republic	Kajot Arena
14 February	Ostrava	Czech Republic	Zimní Stadion Sareza
17 February	České Budějovice	Czech Republic	Sportovní Hala
18 February	Prague	Czech Republic	BC Sparta
25 March	Moscow	Russia	Stone Club
2 May ^{(Cancelled)}	London	England	Wembley Arena
4 May ^{(Cancelled)}	Manchester	England	MEN Arena
27 May	Saarbrücken	Germany	Saarlandhalle
29 May	Frankfurt	Germany	Jahrhunderthalle
10 June	Copenhagen	Denmark	Bøgescenerne
13 June	Bonn	Germany	Museumsplatz
10 August	Skanderborg	Denmark	Smukfest Skanderborg
13 August	Istanbul	Turkey	Parkorman
24 October	Hong Kong	China	Harbour Fest
1 December	Tokyo	Japan	Tokyo Dome
2 December	Tokyo	Japan	Tokyo Dome
18 December	Saint Petersburg	Russia	SKK Peterburgsky

=== Live performances ===
To promote "All the Things She Said", t.A.T.u. performed the song on many television shows in the United States. They first appeared on The Tonight Show with Jay Leno where the girls French kissed each other despite the record company making an agreement at the time of the booking that they would not do so, which the show found "unacceptable". The show switched to filming the group's backing guitarist for the entire 25-second length of the girls' kiss. Conversely, when they next appeared on Jimmy Kimmel Live!, the show's executive producer complained that they did not kiss. They also performed the single on AOL Sessions, MADtv, Carson Daly Show, Total Request Live and the 2003 MTV Movie Awards. They also performed the song on shows in many other countries such as CD:UK in the UK and Top of the Pops in Italy.

== Singles ==
"All the Things She Said" was released as the first single off the album in August 2002. The song topped many charts around the world, including Australia, Germany, France, New Zealand and the United Kingdom. The song peaked at number twenty on the US Billboard Hot 100, becoming the highest Russian act to do so. The song was directed by their manager Ivan Shapovalov, with the girls in school uniforms kissing.

"Not Gonna Get Us" was released in early 2003 by Interscope Records, both physically and digitally. It was met with favorable reception, with praise for the departure from their first single and its radio-friendly appeal. The video was also shot by Shapolavov, where it features the girls escaping a prison-like environment in a construction truck.

"Show Me Love" and "30 Minutes" were both released promotionally in Europe, not managing to receive success critically or commercially. Music video's for each single were released, with "30 Minutes" receiving controversy due to nudity.

"How Soon Is Now?", a cover from The Smiths was the final single from the studio album. The song received mixed reviews, praising the potential while criticizing the production and the duo's vocal abilities. The song managed to chart moderately around Europe and Australia.

"Ne ver, ne boysya" was used as the official Russian entry to the 2003 Eurovision Song Contest. Released as a promotional single in May 2003, the song came third in the competition.

== Critical reception ==
Professional ratings
Review scores
Source	Rating
AllMusic	2/5 stars
Drowned in Sound	8/10 stars
Entertainment.ie	3/5 stars
The Guardian	4/5 stars
Heat	9/10 stars
MusicOMH	(favourable)
PopMatters	(favourable)
Robert Christgau	(2-star Honorable Mention)
Rolling Stone	2/5 stars
Stylus Magazine	D

200 km/h in the Wrong Lane received mixed reviews. Entertainment.ie gave it a favorable review, awarding it three stars, saying "A teenage lesbian duo from Russia may sound like a marketing man's fantasy rather than a living, breathing pop band", concluding that "Tatu's novelty value won't, of course, last forever. But for now, they're as entertaining as anyone in mainstream chart music." Michael Osborn from MusicOMH was positive, saying "Short it may be, but TATU's initial English language offerings are fresh-sounding pop songs of such a high pedigree, that this is an album which will be played to death," also stating "Ignore all the headlines - this intriguing Russian act has the ability to hit all the right notes with their music alone, and have more than just one mammoth smash to offer." David Merryweather from Drowned in Sound called the album "the first pop masterpiece of the year".

However, Stephen Thomas Erlewine from AllMusic rated the album two stars out of five, calling the band a marketing gimmick, and adding that the songs could not be fun due to leaning on "heavy, portentous Europop, badly sung by two girls with annoying squawks for voices." He ended by saying, "With those relentless, gloomy beats and those voices that cut against the grain, it's easy to concentrate on nothing but the gimmick, because it's more fun to talk about Russian teenage lesbians than listen to this noisy, oppressive murk. Even then, you'll feel unclean, given the shamelessness of the exploitation in this whole crass, commercial enterprise." Todd Burns from Stylus Magazine awarded the album with a D rating, calling it an "obviously pop product and probably not worth the money to buy, but certainly essential pop listening if only for the already European released singles." However, he was positive towards the single releases, calling them "phenomenal confectionary pop constructions."

== Commercial performance ==
In the United States, the album debuted at number thirty-six and peaked at thirteen, selling 51,000 copies in its second week becoming the best-gaining sales of that week end. It stayed in the charts for thirty-three weeks in total. In October 2005, the album sold 760,000 copies in North America, according to Nielsen Soundscan. As of a 2012, the album had sold 831,000 copies there, becoming the group's best selling album and being certified gold by Recording Industry Association of America (RIAA) for shipments of 500,000 copies.

The album debuted at number nineteen on the Australian Albums Chart on 30 March 2003, the highest debut of that week. It remained in the top forty until its tenth week, where it dropped to forty-four and stayed for eleven runs. The album entered at number nine on the New Zealand Albums Chart, becoming the second highest charting album of that week and the group's only top ten studio album. The album descended all its way to number thirty-eight and stayed at total of twelve runs through the chart. In Japan, the album sold more than 300,000 copies in just two days, making them the most successful Eastern European act to have the most sales in a week. As of 2010, the album has sold over five million copies worldwide.

== 10th Anniversary Edition ==
In October 2012, the group's previous record labels Interscope and Cherrytree Records announced a 10th anniversary edition, titled 200 km/h in the Wrong Lane: 10 Year Anniversary Edition, as recognition of a ten-year anniversary from the original version. The album contains a previously unreleased song entitled "A Simple Motion", which was recorded in 2002. The song is the English version of their Russian single, "Prostye Dvizheniya".

The album is remastered and includes new remixes, the explicit versions of "All the Things She Said", "Show Me Love" and the extended version of "Show Me Love". The album features a new artwork that was taken from around 2002, and was released with a parental advisory sticker on 12 November 2012. Not long after its announcement, new artwork was released on the Cherrytree website.

== Track listing ==
No.	Title	Writer(s)	Producer(s)	Length
1.	"Not Gonna Get Us"	Lyrics: Trevor Horn; Elena Kiper; Valery Polienko Music: Sergio Galoyan with co-author	Horn	4:21
2.	"All the Things She Said"	Lyrics: Horn; Martin Kierszenbaum; Kiper; Polienko Music: Galoyan with co-author	Horn	3:34
3.	"Show Me Love"	Lyrics: Kierszenbaum; Polienko Music: Galoyan	Kierszenbaum; Robert Orton	4:16
4.	"30 Minutes"	Lyrics: Kierszenbaum; Polienko Music: Galoyan; Ivan Shapovalov	Kierszenbaum; Orton	3:18
5.	"How Soon Is Now?"	Morrissey; Johnny Marr	Kierszenbaum; Orton	3:16
6.	"Clowns (Can You See Me Now?)"	Lyrics: Horn; Polienko Music: Evgeni Kuritsyn; Shapovalov	Horn	3:12
7.	"Malchik Gay"	Lyrics: Anna Karasyova; Kierszenbaum; Vadim Stepantsov Music: Galoyan	Kierszenbaum; Orton	3:09
8.	"Stars"	Lyrics: Kierszenbaum; Aleksandr Vulykh; Polienko; Shapovalov Music: Aleksandr Voitinskiy	Kierszenbaum; Orton	4:08
9.	"Я Сошла С Ума" (Ya Soshla S Uma)	Lyrics: Kiper; Polienko Music: Galoyan with co-author	Horn	3:35
10.	"Нас Не Догонят" (Nas Ne Dagoniat)	Lyrics: Kiper; Polienko Music: Galoyan with co-author	Horn	4:22
11.	"Show Me Love" (Extended version)	Lyrics: Kierszenbaum; Polienko Music: Galoyan	Kierszenbaum; Orton	5:09
Total length:				42:19

International bonus track
No.	Title	Writer(s)	Producer(s)	Length
12.	"30 Minutes" (Remix)	Lyrics: Kierszenbaum; Polienko Music: Galoyan; Shapovalov	Kierszenbaum; Orton	5:53
Total length:				48:11

Japanese bonus track
No.	Title	Writer(s)	Length
12.	"Malchik Gay" (Remix Edit)	Lyrics: Karasyova; Kierszenbaum; Stepantsov Music: Galoyan	3:52
13.	"All the Things She Said" (DJ Monk's Breaks Mix Edit)	Lyrics: Horn; Kierszenbaum; Kiper; Polienko Music: Galoyan	3:48

European and United Kingdom bonus track
No.	Title	Writer(s)	Producer(s)	Length
12.	"Malchik Gay" (Remix)	Lyrics: Karasyova; Kierszenbaum; Stepantsov Music: Galoyan	Kierszenbaum; Orton	5:07

Enhanced content
No.	Title	Length
1.	"Behind-the-Scenes with Julia and Lena" (Part 2)	4:29
2.	"All the Things She Said" (music video)	3:46

Deluxe edition bonus track
No.	Title	Writer(s)	Producer(s)	Length
12.	"Ne ver, ne boysya" (Eurovision 2003)	Lyrics: Polienko Music: Mars Lasar; Shapovalov	Shapovalov	3:04

Deluxe edition DVD
No.	Title	Length
1.	"Julia + Lena are t.A.T.u." (Documentary)	23:53
2.	"All the Things She Said" (music video)	3:44
3.	"Not Gonna Get Us" (music video)	3:56
4.	"How Soon Is Now?" (music video)	3:11

=== 200 km/h in the Wrong Lane – 10 Year Anniversary Edition ===
No.	Title	Writer(s)	Producer(s)	Length
1.	"A Simple Motion"	Lyrics: Kierszenbaum; Polienko Music: Lasar; Shapovalov	Kierszenbaum; Orton	2:47
2.	"Not Gonna Get Us"	Lyrics: Horn; Kiper; Polienko Music: Galoyan	Horn	4:21
3.	"All the Things She Said"	Lyrics: Horn; Kierszenbaum; Kiper; Polienko Music: Galoyan	Horn	3:34
4.	"Show Me Love"	Lyrics: Kierszenbaum; Polienko Music: Galoyan	Kierszenbaum; Orton	4:16
5.	"30 Minutes"	Lyrics: Kierszenbaum; Polienko Music: Galoyan; Shapovalov	Kierszenbaum; Orton	3:18
6.	"How Soon Is Now?"	Morrissey; Marr	Kierszenbaum; Orton	3:16
7.	"Clowns (Can You See Me Now?)"	Lyrics: Horn; Polienko Music: Kuritsyn; Shapovalov	Horn	3:12
8.	"Malchik Gay"	Lyrics: Karasyova; Kierszenbaum; Stepantsov Music: Galoyan	Kierszenbaum; Orton	3:09
9.	"Stars"	Lyrics: Kierszenbaum; Vulykh; Polienko; Shapovalov Music: Voitinskiy	Kierszenbaum; Orton	4:08
10.	"Ya Soshla S Uma" (Я Сошла С Ума)	Lyrics: Kiper; Polienko Music: Galoyan	Horn	3:35
11.	"Nas Ne Dagoniat" (Нас Не Догонят)	Lyrics: Kiper; Polienko Music: Galoyan	Horn	4:22
12.	"Show Me Love" (Extended version)	Lyrics: Kierszenbaum; Polienko Music: Galoyan	Kierszenbaum; Orton	5:09
13.	"30 Minutes" (Remix)	Lyrics: Kierszenbaum; Polienko Music: Galoyan; Shapovalov	Kierszenbaum; Orton	5:53
14.	"All the Things She Said" (Fernando Garibay Remix)	Lyrics: Horn; Kierszenbaum; Kiper; Polienko Music: Galoyan		4:01
15.	"Show Me Love" (Fabricated Remix)	Lyrics: Kierszenbaum; Polienko Music: Galoyan		4:04

== Personnel ==
- Lena Katina – vocals
- Yulia Volkova – vocals
- Martin Kierszenbaum – arranger, producer, A&R
- Cindy Cooper – production coordination
- Sheryl Nields – photography
- Trevor Horn – arranger, producer
- Robert Orton – arranger, mixing, engineer, producer
- Bob Ludwig – mastering
- Sergio Galoyan – producer, composer
- Dean Beckett – package co-ordinator (10th anniversary edition)
- Greg Benninger – package design (10th anniversary edition)

== Charts ==
=== Weekly charts ===
Weekly charts for 200 km/h in the Wrong Lane
Chart (2002–2003)	Peak position
Argentinian Albums (CAPIF)	11
Australian Albums (ARIA)	19
Austrian Albums (Ö3 Austria)	1
Belgian Albums (Ultratop Wallonia)	16
Canadian Albums (Billboard)	19
Danish Albums (Hitlisten)	13
Dutch Albums (Album Top 100)	32
European Top 100 Albums (Billboard)	4
Finnish Albums (Suomen virallinen lista)	2
French Albums (SNEP)	8
German Albums (Offizielle Top 100)	3
Greek Albums (IFPI Greece)	21
Hungarian Albums (MAHASZ)	1
Irish Albums (IRMA)	66
Italian Albums (FIMI)	5
Japanese Albums (Oricon)	1
New Zealand Albums (RMNZ)	9
Portuguese Albums (AFP)	20
Scottish Albums (Official Charts)	14
Swedish Albums (Sverigetopplistan)	14
Swiss Albums (Schweizer Hitparade)	5
UK Albums (Official Charts)	12
US Billboard 200	13

=== Monthly charts ===
Monthly charts for 200 km/h in the Wrong Lane
Chart (2003)	Peak position
Argentinian Albums (CAPIF)	13
South Korean International Albums (MIAK)	6

=== Year-end charts ===
2002 year-end charts for 200 km/h in the Wrong Lane
Chart (2002)	Position
Finnish Albums (Suomen virallinen lista)	15

2003 year-end charts for 200 km/h in the Wrong Lane
Chart (2003)	Position
Austrian Albums (Ö3 Austria)	26
Belgian Albums (Ultratop Wallonia)	54
Danish Albums (Hitlisten)	100
Finnish Albums (Suomen virallinen lista)	90
French Albums (SNEP)	72
German Albums (Offizielle Top 100)	18
Hungarian Albums (MAHASZ)	17
Japanese Albums (Oricon)	7
South Korean International Albums (MIAK)	9
Swiss Albums (Schweizer Hitparade)	61
UK Albums (OCC)	146
US Billboard 200	109
Worldwide (IFPI)	12

=== Decade-end charts ===
Chart (2000–2009)	Position
Japanese Albums (Oricon)	62

== Certifications and sales ==
Certifications and sales for 200 km/h in the Wrong Lane
Region	Certification	Certified units/sales
Canada (Music Canada)	2× Platinum	200,000^{^}
Finland (Musiikkituottajat)	Platinum	49,418
France (SNEP)	Gold	100,000^{*}
Germany (BVMI)	Gold	150,000^{^}
Greece (IFPI Greece)	Gold	10,000^{^}
Hungary (MAHASZ)	Gold	10,000^{^}
Italy (FIMI)	Platinum	100,000^{*}
Japan (RIAJ)	Million	2,000,000
Mexico (AMPROFON)	Gold	75,000^{^}
Russia	—	1,000,000
South Korea	—	55,010
Spain (Promusicae)	Gold	50,000^{^}
Sweden (GLF)	Gold	30,000^{^}
Switzerland (IFPI Switzerland)	Platinum	40,000^{^}
United Kingdom (BPI)	Gold	100,000^{^}
United States (RIAA)	Gold	831,000
Summaries
Europe (IFPI)	Platinum	1,000,000^{*}
Worldwide	—	5,000,000
^{*} Sales figures based on certification alone.^{^} Shipments figures based on certification alone.
