= 200 Po Vstrechnoy =

200 Po Vstrechnoy 200 По Встречной
- Original release cover

Studio album by t.A.T.u.
- Released: 21 May 2001
- Recorded: 1999–2000
- Genres: Europop; pop rock; electronic; Eurodance; electronica
- Length: 43:04
- Language: Russian
- Labels: Neformat; Universal Music Russia
- Producer: Ivan Shapovalov

t.A.T.u. chronology
200 Po Vstrechnoy; 200 По Встречной (2001)	200 km/h in the Wrong Lane (2002)

Singles from 200 Po Vstrechnoy
- 1. "Ya Soshla s Uma" Released: 19 December 2000; 2. "Nas Ne Dogonyat" Released: 21 May 2001; 3. "30 Minut" Released: 10 September 2001

Alternative cover
- 2002 re-release cover

200 Po Vstrechnoy (Cyrillic: 200 По Встречной; translation: "200 [km/h] Against the Traffic", pronounced [ˈdvʲestɪ pɐfˈstrʲet͡ɕnɐj]) is the debut studio album by Russian pop duo t.A.T.u. It was released by Neformat Records and Universal Music Russia on 21 May 2001 in Russia, Ukraine, and Poland, followed by a re-released on 15 February 2002 with new tracks and a new cover. It was released by Universal Music Russia worldwide on 23 June 2003. The group was formed by manager and producer Ivan Shapovalov following Yulia Volkova and Lena Katina's time in the children's group Neposedy. t.A.T.u. subsequently signed a deal with Universal Music Russia to produce their debut album. It was recorded between 1999 and 2000 and was produced and co-composed by Shapovalov.

Musically, 200 Po Vstrechnoy is an electronic album that incorporates elements of pop rock, and lyrically focuses on themes of love, love problems and lesbianism. Upon its release, the album received mixed reaction from critics and the public; majority of the criticism was aimed at the lyrical content and the image, whilst some highlighted the singles as some of their best work. Commercially, it was a success in Eastern Europe, which sold over one million units as recognised by the International Federation of the Phonographic Industry (IFPI). Three singles were promoted from the album; "Ya Soshla s Uma", "Nas Ne Dogonyat", and "30 Minut". The group commenced their concert tour of the same name as the album in early 2001 and finished in 2002.

== Background and composition ==
t.A.T.u. members Yulia Volkova and Elena Katina had originally worked for the Russian children musical group Neposedi, but Volkova was dismissed due to volatile behaviour. Katina was also accused by Russian journalism of bad behaviour, and left not long after. Russian music manager Ivan Shapovalov held a casting call for a solo singer to be managed by him, and selected Katina out of several other girls. He and his ex-wife, Elena Kiper, then decided to create and manage a duo, and selected Volkova as the second act to the group. They signed to their Russian label Neformat Records, and eventually scouted to look for another label; they signed a deal with Universal Music Russia in early 2000. They began recording the album after finishing the track "Ya Soshla s Uma" in 1999, and finished recording it during mid-2000. The album was produced solely by Shapovalov, whilst the album was composed and written by: Aleksandr Vulikh, Valeriy Polienko, Kiper, Sergio Galoyan, Roman Ryabtsev, Anna Karasyova, and Vadim Stepantsov.

Musically, 200 Po Vstrechnoy is an electronic album that incorporates elements of pop rock. According to Edmond J Coleman and Theo Sandfort, who wrote the book Sexuality and Gender in Postcommunist Eastern Europe and Russia (2005), they noticed that majority of the album's content, particularly "Ya Soshla s Uma" and "Nas Ne Dogonyat", were influenced by techno music; both Coleman and Sandfort believed the sound was influenced by the techno revolution in the late 1990s. The album focuses on themes such as love, teenage sex, and lesbianism.

== Release ==
200 Po Vstrechnoy was released by Neformat and Universal Music Russia in Russia, Ukraine, Czech Republic and Poland regions on 21 May 2001. The album contains nine tracks in both physical and digital formats, with three bonus remixes, and has an cover sleeve that is displays as of a criminal case dossier, with biographies of the girls, fingerprints and partial lyrics in the liner booklet; some versions only issued a four-page booklet. A cassette tape was distributed by Neformat in Ukraine, which features the nine original tracks but two remixes instead of three. On 15 February 2002, after beginning work on English-language material, Universal Music Russia re-released the album that featured a new track titled "Klouny", and a remix for the songs "30 Minut" and "Malchik-Gey". This version included a new artwork and booklet information with illustrations of a clown that reflected the track "Klouny" ("Klouny" meaning "Clowns" in Russian). After the success of their album 200 km/h in the Wrong Lane in 2002, Universal Music Russia distributed the album in other parts of Europe, Japan and Taiwan on 21 September 2003.

To promote the album, three singles were released. The first single was "Ya Soshla S Uma", released on 19 December 2000; the song later gained the English-language version "All The Things She Said". It was a critical success in Europe; In early 2001, Universal Music Group hosted a poll for the audience to vote on which song was the best from 200 Po Vstrechnoy; as a result, "Ya Soshla s Uma" came first place. The single won the MTV Video Music Award for the Russian entry of 2000. In 2001, "Ya Soshla S Uma" won the 100 Pound Hit awarded by Hit FM Russia; they performed the song that same night. As of January 2010, "Ya Soshla s Uma" sold over 50,000 units, and over 200,000 illegal copies. The second single was "Nas Ne Dogonyat", released in 2001. The title of the track was included on the 2006 Russian Dictionary of Modern Quotes (Slovar sovremennykh tsitat). The third and final single was "30 Minut"; it was released as an airplay track, and featured an accompanying music video that was directed by Shapovalov.

== Reception ==
Drago Bonacich from American music publication AllMusic selected "Ya Soshla s Uma", "Nas Ne Dagonyat", and "30 Minut" amongst some of the band's best work. However, the album's critical reviews were generally shaded by the success, yet controversial period of their single "Ya Soshla s Uma", alongside its English version "All The Things She Said"; according to Bonacich, the single was one of the most heavily rotated tracks throughout MTV Europe during its release. The Russian version, prior to the release of "All The Things She Said" at the end of 2002, also received strong attention on MTV throughout the Western world. However, an editor from The Telegraph commented that reviews in Russia were generally favourable and "catapult[ed] the duo to local stardom."

Commercially, 200 Po Vstrechnoy was a success in Eastern Europe. On 22 July 2002, it debuted at number 23 on the Polish Music Charts, one of the highest debuts on that week end. It rose to number 11 the following week, and reached the top ten during its third week. After five weeks, it reached the top spot, making t.A.T.u. the first Russian act to do so. On 14 October, it was certified gold by the Polish Society of the Phonographic Industry (ZPAV) for shipments of 10,000 units; it lasted a total of 39 weeks in the chart, and was certified Platinum by the ZPAV for shipments of 20,000 units. Despite the album not entering any record charts in Japan, it was certified Million by the Recording Industry Association of Japan (RIAJ) for shipments of one million units. It was certified Platinum by the International Federation of the Phonographic Industry (IFPI) for sales of one million units in Europe, making t.A.T.u. the first group to achieve a Platinum certification on two separate bilingual language albums; the other being the English language adaption 200 km/h in the Wrong Lane (2002). They also received the distinction to be the first Eastern European act to achieve a Platinum award; both Volkova and Katina attended the awarding in Moscow, Russia.

In Russia, there were no prominent music charts at the time of the album's release; despite this, it sold 500,000 units inside a two-month period. By the end of the 2001, it sold approximately 850,000 units, which was described by an editor at The Telegraph as "an astonishing number in a country where piracy is estimated to account for some 95 per cent of all sales...". As of August 2016, the album has sold over one million copies in Russia, and has been illegally purchased more than four million units, making it the group's highest selling Russian-language album and one of the highest selling albums in that region.

== Promotion ==
To promote the album, t.A.T.u. commenced their Russian concert tour that used the album's title as its official promotional campaign. The girls prepared in 2000 where they wanted the choreography "precise", to a point where one segment featured the girls stripping off their clothes; this was scrapped from the original plan. The group performed all over Russia and in other countries, such as Ukraine, Kazakhstan, and Belarus between February and December 2001. After the re-release of the album, the group extended the tour in regions such as Bulgaria, Czech Republic, and Poland, amongst other destinations. In July 2015, the group uploaded an official unreleased teaser of their single "Ya Soshla s Uma" to their YouTube channel to commemorate the singles 15th anniversary; with its release date on 19 December, it remained unreleased. However, between June and August 2016, the group uploaded unreleased footage and remixed versions of their singles "Ya Soshla s Uma", "Nas Ne Dogoynat", and "30 Minut".

=== 200 Po Vstrechnoy Tour (2001–2002) ===
Date (2001)	City	Country	Venue
10 February	Odesa	Ukraine	Palace of Sports
16 February	Yekaterinburg	Russia	Myshotera
18 February	Rostov on Don	Russia	Sport Hal
23 February	St. Petersburg	Russia	Plaza Club
17 March	Moscow	Russia	Kremlin Hall
15 May	Moscow	Russia	Radisson-Slavuanskaya
27 May	Moscow	Russia	Down Town
2 June	Moscow	Russia	Kremlin Hall
11 June	Moscow	Russia	Musical Podium
4 July	Almaty	Kazakhstan	Unknown
12 July	Krasnodar	Russia	Unknown
13 July	Minsk	Belarus	Unknown
15 July	Kyiv	Ukraine	Counterassembly Area
31 July	Cheyalbinsk	Russia	Dvorets Sports ‘Yunost’
1 August	Yekaterinburg	Russia	Circus Arena
2 August	Tyumen	Russia	Unknown
10 August	Sochi	Russia	Beach
18 August	Petropavlovsk-Kamchatsky	Russia	Unknown
19 August	Khabarovsk	Russia	Unknown
20 August	Yakutsk	Russia	Unknown
24 August	Malyn	Ukraine	Unknown
9 September	Kyiv	Ukraine	Unknown
10 September	Donetsk	Ukraine	Sports Place ‘Friendship’
21 September	St. Petersburg	Russia	Anniversary
29 September	Zaporizhia	Ukraine	Unknown
30 September	Kharkiv	Ukraine	
1 October	Donetsk	Ukraine	Sports Place ‘Friendship’
3 October	Krasnodar	Russia	Unknown
11 October	St. Petersburg	Russia	Club Water Sea (Akvatoria)
18 October	Krasnodar	Russia	Unknown
19 October	Rostov on Don	Russia	Unknown
22 October	Kyiv	Ukraine	Unknown
29 October	Dnepropetrovsk	Ukraine	Unknown
17 November	Moscow	Russia	The State Kremlin Place of Congresses
23 November	St. Petersburg	Russia	Aquatoria Club
4 December	Rostov on Don	Russia	Unknown
6 December	Nizhnevartovsk	Russia	Tuymen Area
8 December	Kyiv	Ukraine	Counterassembly Area
11 December	Nizhny Novgorod	Russia	Unknown
14 December	Narva	Estonia	Rivera
20 December	Tyumen	Russia	Club Octupus
21 December	Neu-Ulm	Germany	A7
22 December	Wörsttadt	Germany	Ayr
23 December	Baden-Baden	Germany	Unknown
25 December	Berlin	Germany	Sony Center
25 December	Hamburg	Germany	Dogs
25 December	Hanover	Germany	Aurora
26 December	Kyiv	Ukraine	Unknown

Date (2002)	City	Country	Venue
20 January	Baku	Azerbaijan	SKK Geydara Alieva
15 February	Riga	Latvia	Unknown
22 February	Sofia	Bulgaria	Unknown
1 March	St. Petersburg	Russia	Plaza Club
5 March	Berlin	Germany	Casino Club
8 March	St. Petersburg	Russia	DS ‘Yubileyniy’
4 April	Prague	Czech Republic	Unknown
5 April	Brno	Czech Republic	Diskoteka Kiss
6 April	Unknown	Czech Republic	X2
16 April	Tel Aviv	Israel	Unknown
27 April	Moscow	Russia	Park Avenue of Disco
31 July	Prešov	Slovakia	Amfiteáter
1 August	Košice	Slovakia	Amfiteáter
2 August	Poprad	Slovakia	Amfiteáter
3 August	Banská Bystrica	Slovakia	Amfiteáter
5 August	Nitra	Slovakia	Amfiteáter
6 September	Brașov	Romania	Piata Sfatului
21 November	Gdańsk	Poland	Hala Olivia
22 November	Szczecin	Poland	Centrum Targowe Międzynarodowych Targów Szczecińskich
24 November	Białobrzegi	Poland	Hala Sportowa
26 November	Wrocław	Poland	Hala Ludowa
27 November	Poznań	Poland	Arena
28 November	Warsaw	Poland	Centrum Targowe Mokotóv
29 November	Kielce	Poland	Hala Torgowa
30 November	Katowice	Poland	Spodek

== Track listing ==
No.	Title	Lyrics	Music	English Title	Length
1.	"Zachem ya" (Зачем я)	Aleksandr Vulikh; Ivan Shapovalov; Valery Polienko	Aleksandr Voitinskiy	Why Me?	4:07
2.	"Ya Soshla S Uma" (Я сошла с ума)	Elena Kiper; Polienko	Sergio Galoyan; Shapovalov	I've Lost My Mind	3:30
3.	"Nas Ne Dogonyat" (Нас не догонят)	Kiper; Shapovalov; Polienko	Galoyan; Shapovalov	They Won't Catch Us	4:38
4.	"Doschitay do sta" (Досчитай до ста)	Polienko	Voitinskiy	Count to 100	4:37
5.	"30 Minut" (30 минут)	Polienko	Galoyan; Shapovalov	30 Minutes	3:17
6.	"Ya Tvoy Vrag" (Я твой враг)	Roman Ryabtsev	Ryabtsev	I'm Your Enemy	4:06
7.	"Ya Tvoya Ne Pervaya" (Я твоя не первая)	Polienko	Galoyan	I'm Not Your First	4:17
8.	"Robot" (Робот)	Polienko	Voitinskiy	Robot	3:53
9.	"Malchik-Gey" (Mальчик-гей)	Anna Karasyova; Vadim Stepantsov	Galoyan; Shapovalov	Gay Boy	3:18
10.	"Nas Ne Dogonyat" (HarDrum Remix)	Kiper; Shapovalov; Polienko	Galoyan; Shapovalov		3:50
11.	"30 Minut" (HarDrum Remix)	Polienko	Galoyan; Shapovalov		4:02
Total length:					43:04

Hidden track
No.	Title	Lyrics	Music	Length
12.	"Ya Soshla s Uma" (HarDrum Remix)	Kiper; Polienko	Galoyan; Shapovalov	4:13
Total length:				4:13

=== Re-release ===
No.	Title	Lyrics	Music	Translation	Length
1.	"Klouny" (Клоуны)	Polienko	Shapovalov; Evgeny Kuritsyn	Clowns	3:32
2.	"30 Minut" (30 минут)	Polienko	Galoyan; Shapovalov	30 Minutes	3:20
3.	"Doschitay Do Sta" (Досчитай до ста)	Polienko	Voitinskiy	Count Up to 100	4:38
4.	"Zachem Ya" (Зачем я)	Vulykh; Shapovalov; Polienko	Voitinskiy	Why Am I?	4:10
5.	"Nas Ne Dogonyat" (Нас не догонят)	Kiper; Shapovalov; Polienko	Galoyan; Shapovalov	They Won't Catch Us	4:39
6.	"Ya Tvoya Ne Pervaya" (Я твоя не первая)	Polienko	Galoyan	I'm Not Your First	4:19
7.	"Robot" (Робот)	Polienko	Voitinskiy	Robot	3:54
8.	"Malchik-Gey" (Mальчик-гей)	Karasyova; Stepantsov	Galoyan; Shapovalov	Gay Boy	3:20
9.	"Ya Tvoy Vrag" (Я твой враг)	Ryabtsev	Ryabtsev	I'm Your Enemy	4:19
10.	"Ya Soshla S Uma" (Я сошла с ума)	Kiper; Polienko	Galoyan; Shapovalov	I've Lost My Mind	3:33
11.	"30 Minut" (Moscow Grooves Institute Remix)	Polienko	Galoyan; Shapovalov		5:58
12.	"Malchik-Gey" (That Black Remix)	Karasyova; Stepantsov	Galoyan; Shapovalov		5:05

== Credits and personnel ==
Credits adapted from the CD liner notes of 200 Po Vstrechnoy.

Recording

- Mixed and recorded at Neformat Studios by Ivan Shapovalov and Sergio Galoyan in Moscow, Russia.

Personnel

- Yulia Volkova – vocals
- Elena Katina – vocals
- Eugene Kuritsyn – arrangement
- Ivan Shapovalov – producer, music video director, composing, songwriting
- Aleksandr Vulikh – songwriting
- Valeriy Polienko – songwriting, composing
- Elena Kiper – songwriting, composing
- Roman Ryabtsev – songwriting, composing
- Anna Karasyova – songwriting
- Vadim Stepantsov – songwriting
- Neformat – management, record label
- Universal Music Russia – management, record label

== Charts ==
=== Weekly charts ===
Weekly chart performance for 200 Po Vstrechnoy
Chart (2001–2003)	Peak position
Czech Albums (IFPI)	1
European Albums (Music & Media)	57
Japanese Albums (Oricon)	123
Polish Albums (ZPAV)	1
Russian Albums (InterMedia)	1
Slovak Albums (IFPI)	1

=== Year-end charts ===
Year-end chart performance for 200 Po Vstrechnoy
Chart (2002)	Position
Polish Albums (ZPAV)	2

== Certifications and sales ==
Certifications and sales for 200 Po Vstrechnoy
Region	Certification	Certified units/sales
Czech Republic (ČNS IFPI)	Platinum	10,000
Poland (ZPAV)	Platinum	94,000
Russia	—	850,000
Summaries
Europe (IFPI)	Platinum	1,000,000^{*}
Worldwide	—	2,000,000
^{*} Sales figures based on certification alone.

== Release history ==
Region	Date	Format	Label
Russia	21 May 2001	CD	Neformat; Universal Music Russia
Ukraine	21 May 2001	CD	Neformat; Universal Music Russia
Poland	21 May 2001	CD	Neformat; Universal Music Russia
Czech Republic	21 May 2001	CD	Neformat; Universal Music Russia
Ukraine	21 May 2001	Cassette tape	Neformat; Universal Music Russia
Australia	1 January 2002	Digital download	Universal Music Russia
New Zealand	1 January 2002	Digital download	Universal Music Russia
United Kingdom	1 January 2002	Digital download	Universal Music Russia
Ireland	1 January 2002	Digital download	Universal Music Russia
Germany	1 January 2002	Digital download	Universal Music Russia
Spain	1 January 2002	Digital download	Universal Music Russia
France	1 January 2002	Digital download	Universal Music Russia
Italy	1 January 2002	Digital download	Universal Music Russia
Taiwan	1 January 2002	Digital download	Universal Music Russia
Russia	15 February 2002	Enhanced CD	Neformat; Universal Music Russia
Europe	21 September 2003	Enhanced CD	Neformat; Universal Music Russia
Japan	21 September 2003	Enhanced CD	Neformat; Universal Music Russia
Taiwan	21 September 2003	Enhanced CD	Neformat; Universal Music Russia
