= Show Me Love (t.A.T.u. song) =

2002 promotional single by t.A.T.u.

Promotional single by t.A.T.u.

from the album 200 km/h in the Wrong Lane
- Released: November 2002
- Recorded: 2002
- Genre: Electronic rock; synth-pop
- Length: 4:16 (album version); 3:49 (radio edit); 5:09 (extended version)
- Label: Universal; Interscope
- Songwriters: Sergio Galoyan; Martin Kierszenbaum; Valery Polienko
- Producers: Martin Kierszenbaum; Robert Orton

"Show Me Love" is a song by Russian music duo t.A.T.u. It was released as a promotional single for radio stations in Poland, taken from their first English-language studio album 200 km/h in the Wrong Lane (2002). It was meant to be the third official single from 200 km/h in the Wrong Lane, after "All the Things She Said" and "Not Gonna Get Us", however Interscope Records cancelled it and released "How Soon Is Now?" instead. The radio promo was only released in Poland.

"Show Me Love" is the English version of the song "Ya Tvoya Ne Pervaya" (Cyrillic: "Я твоя не первая", literally "I'm not your first"), which is part of the duo's original Russian-language debut album 200 Po Vstrechnoy.

== Background and composition ==
According to t.A.T.u. member Lena Katina, Ivan Shapovalov was inspired to create t.A.T.u. after the release of the 1998 Swedish film Show Me Love, which was centred on a romance between two schoolgirls.

The album version of "Show Me Love" opens to Katina and Julia Volkova speaking in their native Russian, which translated means "Hello / Hello / Can you see the wind? / So what? / Just look out of the window / So what? / There was sun yesterday / So what? / Why are you always saying the same thing? / I am an answering machine". The song then begins, featuring a prominent synthesizer beat throughout the duration of the song, with lyrics regarding to events played down to seem like nuances. The chorus features repetition of the phrase "show me love". The line "Played by fucking lunatics" at the end of the second verse has the word "fucking" censored on the album version, but not during live performances or on the 10th anniversary edition of the album.

At the end of the song, the lyrics include the line "Mama, Papa, forgive me." In early leaked demos, this line was consistently present on the group's single 30 Minutes". However, it is not originally associated with "30 Minutes," although it is sometimes heard in the music video for the song.

American singer Billie Eilish further sampled this song in the beginning of "NDA", a song from her sophomore album Happier Than Ever.

== Critical reception ==
"Show Me Love" received polarized reviews from music critics. AllMusic had highlighted the song as an album standout, but had called the song "suggestive". Sputnikmusic gave it a mixed review. They said that the cheesy lyrics wasn't good enough as a highlight, but said it's worth "listening to".

However, Adriandenning.co.uk gave it a really negative remark, saying that "Show Me Love" is "fucking awful" and also compared it to horrible Eurovision songs saying it's "Semi-eurovision crap". Michael Orsborn from musicOMH gave it a nice remark, along with the song "Not Gonna Get Us", saying "Big production values which have a definite whiff of the '80s steam through on 'Not Gonna Get Us' and 'Show Me Love'." Todd Burns from Stylus Magazine gave it a mixed review. He said he was unimpressed that the song was not a single as he said it sounds "wise, than the first two tracks" but he also added "[that] 'Show Me Love', in particular, lacks the energy and dynamism of the previous two singles, merely plodding along at its own pace."

== Music video ==
The music video was directed by Ivan Shapovalov and filmed between May and June 2003. The video shoot took place in Los Angeles, London, Moscow and Tokyo. However, the music video was cancelled and was never released. Several scenes from the video eventually leaked on YouTube in July 2006.

=== Controversy ===
Shapovalov was arrested during the shooting of the music video due to disturbing the peace while shooting in Red Square in Moscow. After the incident, he was later banned from filming near Big Ben in London, but did shoot at Tower Bridge.

== Track listing ==
Polish Promo CD single

1. "Show Me Love"
2. "Ya Tvoya Ne Pervaya"
3. "All the Things She Said"

== Cover version ==
Hong Kong singer Emme Wong covered the song in Cantonese in 2003. The song was released as the second single from Wong's widely talked about album, which was full of songs with sexual implication. The song was more explicit in context, but less of a commercial success compared to her first single, a cover of "Round Round" originally sung by the UK girl band Sugababes.

== Dorofeeva version of "Ya Tvoya Ne Pervaya" ==
"Ya Tvoya Ne Pervaya"

Single by Dorofeeva

from the album 200 Po Vstrechnoy (tribute album)
- Language: Russian
- Released: 5 November 2021
- Recorded: 2021
- Length: 2:40
- Label: Lookport
- Songwriters: Sergio Galoyan; Valery Polienko

Dorofeeva singles chronology
"Nevesta" (2021)	"Ya Tvoya Ne Pervaya" (2021)	"Raznotsvetnaya" (2021)

Music video
- "Я твоя не первая" on YouTube

Ukrainian singer Dorofeeva released a cover of the original version of the song as a single on 5 November 2021 as part of the official Tribute Album 200 Po Vstrechnoy. Music video was released via official YouTube channel of Dorofeeva on 25 November 2021.

=== Charts ===
Chart performance for "Ya Tvoya Ne Pervaya"
Chart (2024)	Peak position
Moldova Airplay (TopHit)	163
