= Ne ver, ne boysya =

2003 single by t.A.T.u.

(Russia) "Ne ver, ne boysya"
- Promo CD cover

Eurovision Song Contest 2003 entry
- Country: Russia
- Artists: Lena Katina; Julia Volkova
- As: t.A.T.u.
- Language: Russian
- Composers: Mars Lasar; Ivan Shapovalov
- Lyricist: Valery Polienko

Finals performance
- Final result: 3rd

Entry chronology
- ◄ "Northern Girl" (2002)
- "Believe Me" (2004) ►

"Ne ver, ne boysya" (Russian: Не ве́рь, не бо́йся, IPA: [nʲɪ ˈvʲerʲ nʲɪ ˈbojsʲə], lit. 'Don't believe, don't fear') also known as "Ne ver, ne boysya, ne prosi" (Не ве́рь, не бо́йся, не проси́, "Don't believe, don't fear, don't ask") is a song by t.A.T.u.. It represented Russia in the Eurovision Song Contest 2003.

== Production ==
The title of the song is based on a Russian prison saying, which entered Russian mainstream culture due to Aleksandr Solzhenitsyn's book The Gulag Archipelago. The term has also been interpreted as a reference to the repression faced by the LGBTQ community.

According to Australian-born Mars Lasar, the song was produced by him and Ivan Shapovalov by sending MP3s over the internet to each other, with Lasar in the U.S. and Shapovalov in Russia. There are several versions of the song, including the promotional version that was used for Eurovision promotions.

== Release ==
"Ne ver, ne boysya" was a promo-only release distributed for Eurovision. The song was first included on the UK maxi-CD single for "Not Gonna Get Us" on 19 May 2003. It was also released on the single for "How Soon Is Now?", and on the UK Deluxe Edition of 200 km/h in the Wrong Lane on 26 May 2003. It was then released on 25 November 2003 in t.A.T.u. Remixes. The song reappeared in 2006 on The Best. An official English version of the song was never released. To celebrate the 20th anniversary of the duo's Eurovision performance, the song, "Don't Trust The Voices," was created by the official t.A.T.u. community on VK (VKontakte) using artificial intelligence. The song was uploaded to the YouTube channel @TATUMUSIC on 30 May 2023.

== Music video ==
The song has a music video, directed by Valery Polienko, that contains videos of wars, accidents, and other pictures of the real world, as well as videos of Lena Katina and Julia Volkova. The video is on both t.A.T.u.'s official MySpace and YouTube pages.

== Eurovision Song Contest 2003 ==
t.A.T.u represented Russia at the Eurovision Song Contest 2003 with this song. In his 2017 book Eurovision! A History of Modern Europe Through the World’s Greatest Song Contest, author Chris West suggested that the group's selection to represent Russia in the contest was partly intended to counter accusations of Russian cultural conservatism. Australian professor Bronwyn Winter suggested that the entry could be interpreted as "a mild protest song", in that the artists' lesbian image contrasted with Russia's gender norms. The song was initially considered a favorite to win the contest.

It was the eleventh song performed on the night, following Germany's Lou with "Let's Get Happy" and preceding Spain's Beth with "Dime". The group reportedly arrived late to rehearsals in the lead-up to the show, and threatened to deliver their performance naked; they ultimately opted to perform in T-shirts with the number one on them and old jeans, while holding hands. Their live performance was booed by some audience members, while their outfit later earned them the annual Barbara Dex Award for worst-dressed Eurovision contestants.

At the close of the voting, the song had received 164 points, placing it 3rd in a field of 26. Five countries awarded Russia with the maximum 12 points: Croatia, Estonia, Latvia, Slovenia and Ukraine. The UK and Ireland were the only countries in the contest not to vote for the song. This led to complaints from the Russian officials which then led to the BBC and RTÉ revealing the full order of how the countries had voted (something which they had never done before or since). The Russian entry was in neither of their top ten lists. If this had not been the case, there would have been a good chance that the song could have won. The song was only one point behind the second-placed song from Belgium and three points behind the winning song from Turkey. West posited that the group's third-place finish "was a reward for pre-existing notoriety rather than for anything they brought to Latvia."
