= All the Things She Said =

2002 single by t.A.T.u.

Single by t.A.T.u.

from the album 200 km/h in the Wrong Lane
- B-side: "Stars"; "Ya Soshla s Uma"
- Released: 13 August 2002
- Genre: Alternative rock; Eurodance; Eurotrance
- Length: 3:34
- Label: Universal Music Russia; Interscope
- Songwriters: Sergio Galoyan; Trevor Horn; Martin Kierszenbaum; Valery Polienko; Elena Kiper
- Producer: Trevor Horn

t.A.T.u. singles chronology
"Prostye Dvizheniya" (2002)	"All the Things She Said" (2002)	"Not Gonna Get Us" (2003)

Music videos
- "All the Things She Said" on YouTube; "Ya Soshla s Uma" on YouTube

Alternative cover
- Original Russian cover ("Ya Soshla s Uma")

"All the Things She Said" is a song by Russian music duo t.A.T.u. from their first English-language studio album, 200 km/h in the Wrong Lane (2002). The song was first released in the United States as a DVD single on 13 August 2002, then was issued in various countries worldwide throughout late 2002 and early 2003 as the album's lead single.

"All the Things She Said" was written by Sergio Galoyan, Trevor Horn, Martin Kierszenbaum, Valery Polienko and Elena Kiper, while production was by Horn. It is a translated and reworked version of their 2000 song "Ya Soshla s Uma" (Russian: Я сошла с ума, pronounced [ja sɐˈʂla sʊˈma], lit. 'I've Lost My Mind'), included on their debut album 200 Po Vstrechnoy (2001). It was later included on their compilation albums t.A.T.u. Remixes (2003) and The Best (2006). Although its original story was based on a dream Kiper had at a dentist appointment, manager Ivan Shapovalov evoked the theme of lesbianism in both this and the English-language version. The lyrics describe two girls developing feelings for each other.

"All the Things She Said" received mixed reviews from music critics: while some commended the production and lyrical content, others called it a gimmick and suggestive. "All the Things She Said" reached number one in several countries around the world, including Australia, Austria, Ireland, New Zealand, Switzerland and the United Kingdom. It also reached number 20 on the US Billboard Hot 100, the first Russian act to have a top 40 single and the highest placing for a Russian act.

Shapovalov commissioned the accompanying music video for the single, which shows the group behind a fence in school uniforms, trying to escape. The music video caused considerable controversy in several nations because it depicted lesbian girls. Several organisations protested against the video and sought to ban it, while some music stations removed the scenes featuring the girls kissing. The song has been performed many times, including on many TV shows, along with a megamix version with "Not Gonna Get Us" at the 2003 MTV Movie Awards. It was also the first Russian music video on YouTube to receive a Vevo Certified Award for reaching 100 million views in June 2016.

== Background ==
Yulia Volkova and Lena Katina auditioned in a children's group named Neposedy. However, Volkova was removed from the group a year later. Russian tabloids believed her removal was based on misbehavior and disrupting other members by stripping, smoking, drinking alcohol and swearing, but Neposedy denied this. Russian producers Ivan Shapovalov and Alexander Voitinskiy held an audition for two teenage girls, where Volkova and Katina auditioned and won the part. Despite knowing each other, both girls did not know the other was auditioning. For their Russian debut, Shapolavov named the duo Тату ("Tatu"). The name is an abbreviation of the Russian phrase Ta lyubit tu (Russian: Та любит ту, "She loves her").

During their first sessions, Voitinskiy left the project. Shapovalov hired Elena Kiper to co-write and co-produce the music of Тату. Together, they wrote "Ya Soshla s Uma". The duo, alongside several other Russian producers and songwriters, completed the group's first album 200 Po Vstrechnoy. The album was a large success in Europe, selling over one million units. Shapovalov persisted in trying to sign the group with an international label, visiting North America and meeting with several record companies. He eventually settled a deal with a Russian division of Universal Music Group and Interscope Records.

== Writing ==
"Ya Soshla s Uma", the original version of "All the Things She Said", was written by Sergio Galoyan, Martin Kierszenbaum, Valery Polienko and Elena Kiper. It was mixed and recorded by Robert Orton at UMG Studios in Santa Monica, California.

Kiper conceived the song after dreaming about kissing another woman while she was undergoing a dental surgery. She woke up saying "Я сошла с ума!" (transl. I've lost my mind!). After telling Shapovalov, he started to write the second phrase, "Мне нужна она" (transl. I need her). Shapovalov included the lesbian theme in the English version. Shapovalov had been accused by Russian media of taking Kiper's idea and presenting it as his own, whilst Kiper stated that she had conceived the whole idea herself. "Ya Soshla s Uma" was written by Sergio Galoyan, Kiper and Valeriy Polienko, whilst production was handled by the group's manager, Shapovalov. He also composed the track, and it was recorded by him at the Neformat Studios, Russia in the early 2000.

Two versions of the single were released: the original version that appears on 200 Po Vstrechnoy, with a more dance/electro composition; and the reworked, pop-rock version (used for "All The Things She Said") appearing on 200 km/h in the Wrong Lane (2002).

== Composition ==
It is a "grungy" Eurodance and Alternative rock song with Industrial beats, Harper's Bazaar also described it as "vaguely electronic pop". According to the sheet music published at Musicnotes.com by Universal Music Publishing Group, the song is composed in the key of F minor with a time signature in common time, and a moderate groove of 90 beats per minute. Both Volkova and Katina's vocal range is spread between F_{4} and D♭_{5}. The composition is built on two main live instruments; piano and electric guitar.

The first verse has Volkova and Katina "whisper their desires and then blow up the chorus with enough teen confusion and angst to fill up a week of Hollyoaks". Lyrically, the song discusses difficulty in teenagers allowing themselves to express their sexuality. Katina commented "We're singing about love [...] Even all over the world teenagers, can find themselves in our song[s] 'cause we're singing about these problems, we're singing about teenagers, and I think everybody can understand that".

== Recording ==
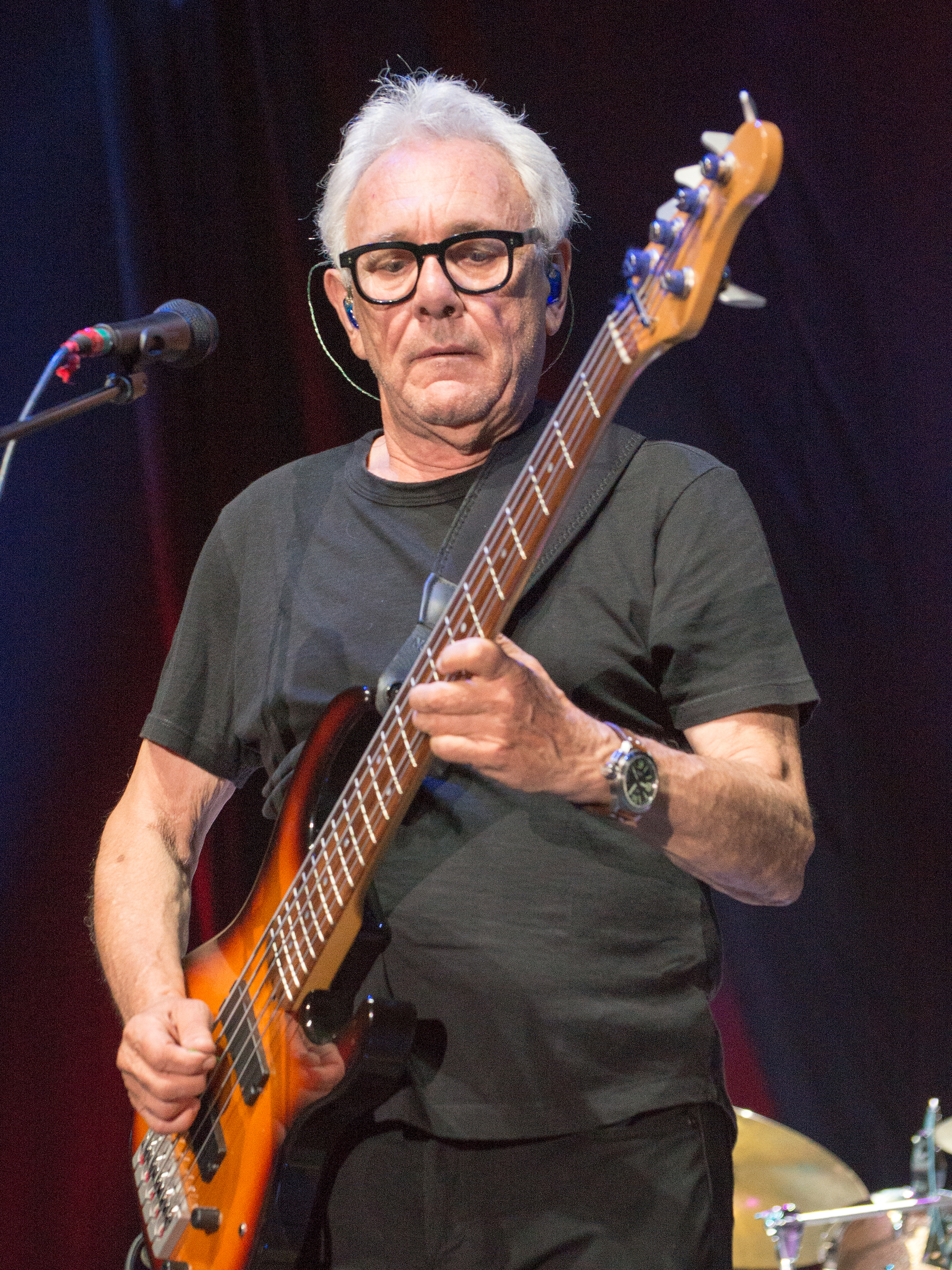
The English producer Trevor Horn (pictured in 2022) produced the English-language version.

The American music executive Jimmy Iovine asked the English producer Trevor Horn to create English-language versions of t.A.T.u.'s songs, including "Ya Soshla s Uma". Horn was given literal translations of the Russian lyrics, but found they did not work in English, and so he rewrote them while keeping the lesbian themes. He renamed it "All the Things She Said".

Horn spent two weeks working with Volkova and Katina, coaching them to sing the English lyrics. When Shapovalov insisted that Horn was being too patient with them, Horn invited him to try leading the session instead. After Shapovalov made both Volkova and Katina cry, Horn removed him from the session. He said later: "There's no shortcut, you can't bully people. So I didn't like him. But I liked the girls. They were both bumming cigarettes off me. They were 18, the manager didn't want them to be seen smoking."

Horn rerecorded the instruments, as he did not have access to the original multitracks. After the recording was complete, Horn felt the song was missing something and listened again to the Russian original. When he realised that the Russian chorus repeated lines, he removed some of the new lyrics to repeat the lines "all the things she said" and "running through my head". As Volkova and Katina had left, he adjusted the duplicated lines using pitch-shifting software.

== Release ==
After the completion of "Ya Soshla s Uma", the co-manager of the group, Boris Renski, canceled the release as he felt it would not achieve success with the Russian public. Shapovalov persuaded Renski in allowing the continuation of the band, and offered to pay for the music video himself; Renski accepted the offer.

The recording premiered on 14 December 2000 as the lead single from the album. It was released as a CD single which included the original version, four remix versions, and two enhanced videos (the visual and behind-the-scenes footage). A cassette tape was also issued in Russia, and featured the five tracks from the CD single. After the group signed a contract with Universal Music Russia in 2001, "Ya Soshla s Uma" was re-distributed as a double A-side single with their song, "Nas Ne Dagonyat" (2001), in Poland. That same year, it was sent to radio stations in Germany and Europe. In January 2003, it appeared as a second B-side track on the physical release of "All The Things She Said".

== Critical reception ==
Both the original and English-language versions received mixed reviews. Writing for AllMusic, Drago Bonacich selected the track as one of the group's best songs. Michael Osborn from MusicOMH found the vocals in both versions were incomprehensible. Sean Bertiger from Popdirt.com preferred the Russian version, citing the vocals and emotions. Since its release, the song has achieved accolades and awards. In early 2001, Universal Music Group hosted a poll for the audience to vote on which song was the best from 200 Po Vstrechnoy; as a result, "Ya Soshla s Uma" came first place. That same year, "Ya Soshla s Uma" won the 100 Pound Hit awarded by Hit FM Russia, with t.A.T.u. as well performing the track the same night. On 29 November 2005, Kiper was presented the Songwriting Award at the BMI Honors Top European Songwriters And Publishers; this was her first win at the ceremony, and went on winning the second time with "Not Gonna Get Us" (2002), t.A.T.u.'s second international single. Commercially, the single reached number one on the Russian Singles Chart, charting there for eighteen consecutive weeks. By January 2010, "Ya Soshla s Uma" sold over 50,000 units and over 200,000 illegal copies.

Allmusic reviewer Stephen Thomas Erlewine felt the song was a "gimmick" and "suggestive", but highlighted the song as an album standout. PopMatters called complaints about the song "ridiculous" and added that they do not care if they are "transgender, bisexual, lesbian or gay. In the end, it's about people and yourself feeling safe and better together". Bill Lamb from About.com had prospects for the song, feeling his view was "irrefutable". Rebecca Bary from The New Zealand Herald said "Think 'Baby One More Time' spliced with 'Dirrty' and you have the biggest one-hit wonder of the year." She continued, saying "When these obnoxious, school-uniformed Russian maybe-lesbians poured their squirrelly hearts out over a repetitive dance beat, you can't deny it worked.".

The song was ranked at number 452 in Blender magazine's The 500 Greatest Songs Since You Were Born. The song was listed at number 8 on the AOL's Top 100 Pop Songs of the Decade. Bill Lamb from About.com listed the song on his Top 100 Pop Songs of 2003 at number 31. He also listed it on his Top 10 Contemporary Girl Group Songs at number ten. Stephanie Theobald from The Guardian called it one of her favorite lesbian songs.

The song was ranked at the top spot on the Australian Top 50 Lesbian songs, which was voted by users. AfterEllen.com criticized the song for being at the top spot, exclaiming; "There are so many better songs than that – my mind is blown... I guess it's one of the easier ones to think of in this new generation of lesbians... I just hope they can open up their ears more and discover so many other amazing (really queer) musicians." Though she noted it was as a gay anthem, Mia Jones from AfterEllen.com did not add the song, because "she is still not a fan". In 2020, The Guardian named "All the Things She Said" Horn's greatest work since the mid-80s.

== Commercial performance ==
A high demand for imports of "All the Things She Said" in the UK caused it to debut at number 57 on the UK Singles Chart. It rose to number 44 and ascended to the top of the charts the following week after its official release, making t.A.T.u. the first Russian act to reach number one in the UK. The song spent four weeks at one on the UK Singles Chart and remained in the charts for 15 weeks, earning a double platinum certification from the British Phonographic Industry (BPI), selling more than 1,200,000 units.

As of February 2018, the single has 529,000 combined sales to its name, including 6.7 million streams since 2014. It also reached number one on the Irish Singles Chart for four consecutive weeks. The song peaked at number one in several European countries, including Austria, Denmark, Germany, Italy, Romania, and Spain. The song spent four consecutive weeks at number one on the Italian Singles Chart and stayed in the charts for 16 weeks.

On 23 March 2003, "All the Things She Said" debuted at number one on the Australian Singles Chart and later returned for a week. It remained on the chart for 11 weeks and was certified platinum by the Australian Recording Industry Association (ARIA). It debuted at number 49 on the New Zealand Singles Chart and reached number one five weeks later. It was certified double platinum by Recorded Music NZ for sales of 60,000 units. In the US, it peaked at number 20 on the Billboard Hot 100 chart, where it remains as their only entry on the chart.

== Music video ==
=== Synopsis ===
Lena Katina (left) and Yulia Volkova in the original video for the Russian version

The music video opens with a panning view of a fence and people with umbrellas on the left, eventually zooming out on an audience looking through it in the rain. Both Volkova and Katina are then shown singing to the track in Catholic school uniforms. Throughout the majority of the visual, the girls are featured performing erratic behaviour, which includes them banging against a fence, yelling for help towards the audience, and occasionally laughing at them. While continuing to sing to each other during the second chorus, they subsequently start to kiss, and the audience slightly stares at their actions. Following this, several members of the public start to talk to each other, whilst a shot with the camera looking up Volkova's skirt and exposing her underwear is shown during the process.

The bridge section has the girls lying in water while snow starts to fall. At the last portion of the chorus, t.A.T.u. are portrayed pointing in different directions, until they both walk around corner and see a vast field, where the sun is breaking out of the clouds; they clasp hands and walk off into the distance. The people on the other side of the fence are left in an eerie green light with rain falling steadily; it is also revealed that they are the ones isolated behind the fence. The video's final scene shows the girls walking further in the distance. Several frames from "Ya Soshla s Uma" did not appear in the visual for "All the Things She Said" due to lip-syncing problems.

=== Production ===
A shot from the music video, portraying band members Volkova (left) and Katina wearing school outfits, and running around a corner to find a vast Khodynka Field in Moscow.

The video was directed by Shapovalov and shot at the Khodynka Field in Moscow between 4 and 7 September 2000. Preparation for the visual consisted of both Volkova and Katina covering themselves in dark-tanning lotion and getting haircuts. Over 90 people were present on set, including extra actors, whilst some members had designed a large brick wall by painting abstract patterns and colors to it. According to Shapovalov, the wall itself cost approximately US$3000. After shooting the majority of the scenes in Khodynka Field, Shapovalov moved the wall and iron fence to Kutuzov Avenue, Moscow, in order to shoot frames of traffic until the camera changed its focus on the girls again. Shapovalov stated that he wanted the viewers to know that there was a "world behind the crowd of people". The video was broadcast in Russia and Europe in early December 2000 on MTV.

=== Reception ===
Like "All the Things She Said", the video generated controversy for having the duo kissing, with critics particularly believing that it prompted pedophilia and lesbianism. An editor from The Age commented that the impact of the video for "Ya Soshla s Uma" was generally lukewarm.

The music video won the MTV Video Music Award among the Russian nominees of 2000, marking the group's first nomination and win at the ceremony. Despite this, it caused controversy in Russia similarly to the cultural impact of "All The Things She Said". This resulted in the clip being banned on MTV Russia due to depictions of lesbianism and support for gay rights; a censored version was edited by Shapovalov, omitting any sexual references. According to Jon Kutner, writing in his book 1000 UK Number One Hits, the idea of school girls behind an iron fence courted controversy nevertheless. A member of The Advocate labelled the girls in the videos as "underage porn-quality lolitas", and noted it garnered huge media coverage in Russia alongside commercial sales.

=== Remix versions ===
An official video for the remix version produced by HarDrum was included on the CD format of the single; it included unreleased footage that did not appear on the original version, featuring different angle shots of the girls, expressions from the public's faces and the band performing erratically. It also included various scenes of people on-set helping with the music video's production, and one holding the wired fence. In July and September 2015, the group uploaded two teaser videos of a remix version produced by Fly Dream in order to commemorate the single's 15th anniversary; by then, it still remained unreleased. On 7 August 2016, one year since the two trailers, t.A.T.u. uploaded an HD version of the video with new unreleased scenes and extended footage. Lasting five minutes and 37 seconds, it showed an extended cut of the girls arguing next to the brick wall and walking around the corner to find the vast Khodynka Field with a clearer cityscape in the distance by the fourth minute. The ending of the video portrays t.A.T.u. in the distance, similar to the original video.

== Promotion ==
"Ya Soshla s Uma" was included on the group's 200 Po Vstrechnoy concert tour, where they performed in Russia and Ukraine; they extended the tour in 2002 and traveled to Germany, the Czech Republic, and Poland among others. Parts of "Ya Soshla s Uma" were used during t.A.T.u.'s Truth Tour in St. Petersburg, where it served as the concert's closing number. The single was additionally included on the group's greatest hits compilation album The Best (2006), while the music video and HarDrum remix and video version were included on the former album and their 2003 t.A.T.u. Remixes album. (Note: The liner notes of 200 Km/H in the Wrong Lane incorrectly labels the track as "Ya Shosla S Uma", whilst the liner notes for The Best mentions the recording under the title "Ya Soshia S Uma".) Russian singer Elena Temnikova performed a version of the track with another female artist for a Russian television show while impersonating band member Volkova.

== Controversy ==
The video caused controversy in countries where it was played. In Canada, it was listed on MuchMusic's 50 Most Controversial Videos at number four. It was listed on FHM Music TV on their Most Sexy Videos at number five. Virgin Media included the song on their list of "Sexiest Music Videos Ever". Standard.co.uk listed the song at two on their top Sexiest Music Videos Ever. Clare Simpson from WhatCulture! listed the music video at number six on their 12 Raunchiest Music Videos ever. She said "I remember when this video came out and being totally fascinated by it – the rampant portrayal of lipstick lesbianism on the music television channels during the day time." In 2011, MSN called it the most controversial music video. Urban Garden Magazine listed the video on their Most Controversial Music Videos of All Time. The American magazine FHM ranked the video number thirty on their Sexiest Videos of All Time, saying "This video caused uproar across the world" and that the kissing scene was the highlight of the video. Ugo.com also ranked the video at thirty-eight on their Sexiest Videos of All Time. Fuse TV ranked the video at sixty-four on their "Top 100 Sexiest Music Videos of All Time".

After its worldwide release, the song received media attention worldwide. In the United Kingdom, ITV banned the video from its music show CD:UK, as producer Tammy Hoyle responded "We could not show the video on CD:UK because it is not really suitable for children." Meanwhile, fellow ITV personalities Richard and Judy campaigned to have the video banned from general British television, claiming it pandered to pedophiles with the use of school uniforms and young girls kissing. However, the campaign failed. The BBC denied that they banned the video from its weekly BBC One music show Top of the Pops. MuchMusic had apparent thoughts of banning the music video from airing, but this decision was ultimately scrapped. According to the president of the show, Craig Halket said "We felt that it didn't oversexualize them and they looked of age, (they were 15 at the time) I can see the controversy. It's like many videos, including the Christina Aguilera video -- it pushes buttons."

The music video was the subject of much criticism throughout t.A.T.u.'s career. The AllMusic review for 200 km/h in the Wrong Lane labelled the band as a tawdry gimmick. A writer from The Daily Telegraph expressed the video as "clichéd", while it titillating on a very base and adolescent level, only serves to cheapen the song's lyrical impact. The video is also a sign of how blurred the line between entertainment and exploitation has become.

Three years after the release of the single, Volkova announced her pregnancy. This led to accusations of the girls being "fake", in giving the impression that they were lesbians, although Julia and Lena have said in the past they are not "together" nor "in a relationship". Additionally, in 2014, Julia stated on Russian television that she would "not support a gay son" despite promoting the image of a lesbian relationship.

=== Similarity to Katy Perry's "E.T." ===
In February 2011, US singer Katy Perry released her single "E.T." from her third studio album, Teenage Dream (2010). According to several music publications, the composition and rhythm bar of Perry's single was similar to the sound of "Ya Soshla s Uma"; (Note: Various critics likened Perry's single to the instrumental of "All the Things She Said" or "Ya Soshla s Uma" although both versions share the same backing track.) Matthew Cole from Slant Magazine disliked Perry's song for being "inscrutable" and explained that its backing track was reminiscent of t.A.T.u.'s song. Similarly, The A.V. Club editor Genevieve Koski felt "E.T." "bears more than a passing resemblance" to t.A.T.u.'s single, and a reporter from Sound Magazine posted a mash-up version of the songs to distinguish the comparisons; the website labelled it one of the most "annoyingly addictive" songs. In May 2011, Galoyan responded to the comparisons and criticized Perry's track, considering legal action against the singer, featured hip-hop artist Kanye West, and her labels Capitol Records and Universal Music Group, but not responding since his comments.

== Modern usage and legacy ==
"Our first video was about love between two girls... We do not pretend to be lesbians -- we've never said we were. Julia just had a baby and currently has a boyfriend, and we've both always had boyfriends. We share a special bond."

— t.A.T.u. member Lena Katina, interviewed by Billboard.

The song was parodied on the Australian sketch show Comedy Inc. The video was also parodied on The Frank Skinner Show with Skinner playing Volkova and Jennie McAlpine playing Katina. Leigh Francis parodied the video in the second series of his comedy program Bo' Selecta!

In an interview with The Independent, Yulia claimed that the song had helped people to be honest about their sexual orientations. She said "People used to call us and say 'Thank you. That helped us to come out, [...] You helped us to feel like people.'" She then said "It was our teenage years, [...] You have to try everything. It felt at the time like it was real love – it felt like there was nothing more serious ... Now when you look back at it, of course, it's ridiculous."

The song was used by professional wrestler Victoria from December 2002 to May 2004 as her entrance music in WWE.

The song appears on the soundtrack of the 2013 Richard Curtis film About Time, and features as the theme song for the Red Scare podcast.

The song appears on the soundtrack of the 2024 Sean Baker film Anora, about an American stripper who marries the son of a Russian oligarch.

The song and its cover by English producer Harrison were used in the episode "Rose" of the 2025 Canadian TV series Heated Rivalry, about hockey players from Russia and Canada who fall in love.

== Live performances ==
t.A.T.u. performed the song on many television shows in the United States. They first appeared on The Tonight Show with Jay Leno, where the girls created confusion, because they kissed each other without first having been granted permission to do so. They performed the single on Jimmy Kimmel Live!, at AOL, on Mad TV, Last Call with Carson Daly, Total Request Live and the 2003 MTV Movie Awards.

== Track listings ==
European CD single (2002) and UK cassette single

1. "All the Things She Said" (radio version)
2. "Stars"

European CD single (2003)

1. "All the Things She Said" (radio version)
2. "Stars"
3. "All the Things She Said" (Extension 119 club vocal mix)
4. "Ya Soshla s Uma"

European 12-inch single

A1. "All the Things She Said" (DJ Monk's After Skool Special) – 7:03
A2. "All the Things She Said" (Running and Spinning mix) – 6:13
B1. "All the Things She Said" (Extension 119 club vocal) – 8:30
B2. "All the Things She Said" (original version extended mix) – 5:37

UK CD single

1. "All the Things She Said" (radio version)
2. "All the Things She Said" (Extension 119 club edit)
3. "Stars"
4. "All the Things She Said" (CD-ROM video)

US CD single

1. "All the Things She Said" (radio version) – 3:29
2. "All the Things She Said" (Extension 119 club edit) – 5:16
3. "All the Things She Said" (video)
4. "Behind the Scenes with Julia & Lena" (video)

Australian and New Zealand CD single

1. "All the Things She Said" (radio version)
2. "All the Things She Said" (Mark!'s Intellectual vocal mix)
3. "All the Things She Said" (Extension 119 club edit)
4. "All the Things She Said" (HarDrum remix)

Japanese CD single

1. "All the Things She Said" (radio version) – 3:28
2. "All the Things She Said" (Extension 119 club vocal) – 8:16
3. "All the Things She Said" (Mark!'s Intellectual vocal) – 9:41
4. "All the Things She Said" (Blackpulke mix) – 4:13
5. "All the Things She Said" (instrumental version) – 3:49

== Charts ==
=== Original version ===
==== Weekly charts ====
2002–2003 weekly chart performance for "All the Things She Said"
Chart (2002–2003)	Peak position
Australia (ARIA)	1
Austria (Ö3 Austria Top 40)	1
Belgium (Ultratop 50 Flanders)	2
Belgium (Ultratop 50 Wallonia)	3
Bolivia (Notimex)	5
Canada (Nielsen SoundScan)	3
Canada CHR (Nielsen BDS)	6
Chile (Notimex)	2
Colombia (Notimex)	1
Costa Rica (Notimex)	1
Croatia International Airplay (Top lista)	1
Czech Republic (Rádio – Top 100) Ya soshla s uma	25
Denmark (Tracklisten)	1
El Salvador (Notimex)	2
Europe (Eurochart Hot 100)	1
Finland (Suomen virallinen lista)	3
France (SNEP)	2
Germany (GfK)	1
Greece (IFPI)	3
Hungary (Rádiós Top 40)	13
Hungary (Single Top 40)	3
Ireland (IRMA)	1
Italy (FIMI)	1
Japan (Oricon)	38
Mexico (Monitor Latino)	5
Netherlands (Dutch Top 40)	2
Netherlands (Single Top 100)	2
New Zealand (Recorded Music NZ)	1
Nicaragua (Notimex)	1
Norway (VG-lista)	2
Portugal (AFP)	1
Romania (Romanian Top 100)	3
Scottish Singles Sales (Official Charts)	1
Spain (Promusicae)	1
Sweden (Sverigetopplistan)	2
Switzerland (Schweizer Hitparade)	1
UK Singles (Official Charts)	1
UK Airplay (Music Week)	1
Uruguay (Notimex)	1
US Billboard Hot 100	20
US Dance Club Songs (Billboard) Remixes	5
US Pop Airplay (Billboard)	8
US Rhythmic Airplay (Billboard)	26

2026 weekly chart performance for "All the Things She Said"
Chart (2026)	Peak position
Czech Republic Singles Digital (ČNS IFPI)	73
Global 200 (Billboard)	156
Greece International (IFPI)	46
Russia Streaming (TopHit)	96

==== Year-end charts ====
2002 year-end chart performance for "All the Things She Said"
Chart (2002)	Position
Belgium (Ultratop 50 Flanders)	19
Belgium (Ultratop 50 Wallonia)	23
Canada (Nielsen SoundScan)	106
Finland (Suomen virallinen lista)	14
France (SNEP)	94
Italy (FIMI)	3
Netherlands (Dutch Top 40)	24
Netherlands (Single Top 100)	21
Spain (AFYVE)	8
Sweden (Hitlistan)	5
Switzerland (Schweizer Hitparade)	33

2003 year-end chart performance for "All the Things She Said"
Chart (2003)	Position
Australia (ARIA)	14
Austria (Ö3 Austria Top 75)	3
Belgium (Ultratop 50 Wallonia)	41
Brazil (Crowley)	42
Europe (Eurochart Hot 100)	3
France (SNEP)	16
Germany (Media Control GfK)	5
Ireland (IRMA)	9
New Zealand (RIANZ)	20
Romania (Romanian Top 100)	51
Sweden (Hitlistan)	59
Switzerland (Schweizer Hitparade)	21
UK Singles (OCC)	6
UK Airplay (Music Week)	20
US Mainstream Top 40 (Billboard)	35

==== Decade-end charts ====
Decade-end chart performance for "All the Things She Said"
Chart (2000–2009)	Position
Germany (Media Control GfK)	57

=== Harrison version ===
Weekly chart performance for Harrison's version
Chart (2025–2026)	Peak position
Canada Hot 100 (Billboard)	44
Canada CHR/Top 40 (Billboard)	23
Canada Hot AC (Billboard)	37
Germany Airplay (BVMI)	36
UK Singles Downloads (Official Charts)	51
UK Singles Sales (OCC)	57
US Digital Song Sales (Billboard)	14
US Hot Dance/Electronic Songs (Billboard)	5

== Certifications ==
Certifications and sales for "All the Things She Said"
Region	Certification	Certified units/sales
Australia (ARIA)	Platinum	70,000^{^}
Austria (IFPI Austria)	Gold	15,000^{*}
Belgium (BRMA)	Platinum	50,000^{*}
Brazil (Pro-Música Brasil)	Gold	30,000^{‡}
Denmark (IFPI Danmark)	Gold	7,500
France (SNEP)	Gold	413,900
Germany (BVMI)	2× Platinum	1,000,000^{‡}
Greece (IFPI Greece)	Gold	10,000^{^}
Italy (FIMI) sales since 2009	Gold	50,000^{‡}
New Zealand (RMNZ)	2× Platinum	60,000^{‡}
Norway (IFPI Norway)	2× Platinum	20,000^{*}
Spain (Promusicae)	Gold	30,000^{‡}
Sweden (GLF)	Platinum	30,000^{^}
Switzerland (IFPI Switzerland)	Platinum	40,000^{^}
United Kingdom (BPI)	2× Platinum	1,200,000^{‡}
United States	—	415,000
Streaming
Greece (IFPI Greece)	Platinum	2,000,000^{†}
^{*} Sales figures based on certification alone.^{^} Shipments figures based on certification alone.^{‡} Sales+streaming figures based on certification alone.^{†} Streaming-only figures based on certification alone.

== Release history ==
Release dates and formats for "All the Things She Said"
Region	Date	Format(s)	Label(s)	Ref(s).
United States	13 August 2002	DVD	Interscope; Universal Music Russia	
United States	10 September 2002	CD	Interscope; Universal Music Russia	
Canada	10 September 2002	CD	Interscope; Universal Music Russia	
Europe	16 September 2002	CD	Interscope; Universal Music Russia	
Europe	23 September 2002	CD	Interscope; Universal Music Russia	
United States	28 October 2002	Contemporary hit radio	Interscope; Universal Music Russia	
United Kingdom	27 January 2003	CD; cassette	Interscope; Universal Music Russia	
Japan	5 March 2003	CD	Interscope; Universal Music Russia	
Australia	10 March 2003	CD	Interscope; Universal Music Russia	
