= 19 (Alsou album) =

Studio album by Alsou
- Released: 2003
- Genre: Pop, folk
- Label: Universal Music Russia

Alsou chronology
I Had an Autumn Dream (2002)	19 (2003)	The Main Thing (2008)

19 is Alsou's fourth studio album, was released in Russia on 23 January 2003. This album includes songs in Russian and Tatar languages. Alsou wrote one of the songs. The album was very successful in Russia, with the sales of over 800,000 copies (by December 2003). To support this album, Alsou gave live performances during 2003 and 2004 in Russia, Tatarstan, Azerbaijan, Georgia, Ukraine, Latvia, Estonia, Israel and in many other countries. The tour was very successful as well.

== Track listing ==
No.	Russian title	Transliteration	Translation
1	Вчера	Vchera	Yesterday
2	Первый раз	Perviy raz	First Time
3	Я только звук в мелодии любви	Ya tol`ko zvuk v melodii lyubvi	I'm Just The Sound In The Melody Of Love
4	Всё равно	Vsyo ravno	Whatever
5	Там	Tam	There
6	Первый снег	Perviy sneg	First Snow
7	Город под зонтом	Gorod pod zontom	City Under an Umbrella
8	Эткей	Etkey	Father
9	Заброшенный лес	Zabroshenniy les	Deserted Woods
10	Летящая над облаками	Letyaschaya nad oblakami	Flying Over The Clouds
11	Ангел	Angel	Angel

Bonus tracks in the limited edition:

No.	Russian title	Transliteration	Translation
12	Мечты	Mechty	Dreams
13	Всё равно (dance mix)	Vsyo ravno	Whatever
14	Вчера (dance mix by Sergio Galoyan)	Vchera	Yesterday

== Critical response ==
InterMedia's reviewer Ekaterina Alekseeva gave a negative review of the album, describing it as bland and unremarkable.
