= A Simple Motion =

Song by t.A.T.u.

from the album 200 km/h in the Wrong Lane (re-issue)
- Released: 10 November 2012; 27 February 2013 (The Remixes)
- Genre: Pop
- Length: 2:47
- Label: Cherrytree; Interscope
- Composers: Mars Lasar; Ivan Shapovalov
- Lyricists: Martin Kierszenbaum; Valery Polienko
- Producer: Trevor Horn

Music video
- "A Simple Motion" on YouTube

"A Simple Motion" (Russian language; Prostye Dvizheniya. Cyrillic; Простые Движения, lit. "Simple movements") is a song by Russian recording group t.A.T.u., taken from their re-release of their debut English studio album 200 km/h in the Wrong Lane (2002). The song was written by Mars Lasar, Ivan Shapovalov, Martin Kierszenbaum, Valery Polienko, while the production was handled by Trevor Horn.

== Background ==
"A Simple Motion" was written by Mars Lasar, Ivan Shapovalov, Martin Kierszenbaum, Valeriy Polienko, while the production was handled by Trevor Horn and was to appear on their studio album 200 km/h in the Wrong Lane. Before the song emerged, there was a Russian counterpart entitled "Prostye Dvizheniya". The song was recorded in 2002 and was featured on their remix compilation, t.A.T.u. Remixes (2003). A music video was released in Russia, which caused controversy as it featured a nude Volkova masturbating and having orgasms. The song only appeared on the group's remix compilation.

In February 2008, when t.A.T.u. uploaded the Russian edit on their YouTube page, the group added in their description in the video that pre-recordings of the English version did exist, but were left unreleased.

On 2 October 2012 Cherrytree Records announced via their website that they would be re-releasing the group's first studio album as 200 km/h in the Wrong Lane: 10th Anniversary Edition, a celebration of ten years for the group's first studio album. Cherrytree officially confirmed that an unreleased song, which was "A Simple Motion" would be featured on the re-release album, with the track list being revealed.

== Recording and release ==
The song was recorded in Los Angeles, California in 2002. While working with t.A.T.u, their producer and A&R Martin Kierszenbaum stated he had the "privilege" to work with the group and was proud of releasing the album with the unreleased song. Lena Katina, a member of the group stated that she found "A Simple Motion" her favorite on her album described it along with many album tracks as "nostalgic."

Cherrytree Records premiered the song on their SoundCloud account.

== Critical reception ==
"A Simple Motion" received favorable reviews from music critics, some of whom found it a highlight. Bradley Stern from Muumuse stated "Drifting along mournful strings and a solemn piano melody, the English version is a devastating rendition that puts their lush vocals at the forefront. “A simple motion over and over,” the girls cry out on repeat–well, over and over. It's gorgeous." Virginia López from Eurovisionary described the version "long-awaited" and called it a "ballad with a solemn piano melody."

== Music video ==
There was no official music video for the English version, only a fan-made video for the Planet Purple Remix. A video for only the Russian edit was shot. The music video caused controversy in Russia, as it featured Yulia Volkova masturbating in the video. Some of the controversy was about Julia's age when this footage was taken; the footage carried a timestamp of April 5, 2002, and she was born on February 20, 1985, which would have made her 17 years old if the timestamp was accurate. The video was eventually banned in Russia due to this content.

Volkova responded to the scene, stating "Well, like everybody does. If you don't know, you must be too young! Although I think people your age probably do much less innocent things." Shapovalov, who directed the music video said that he wasn't concerned about a possible ban, saying "Tatu are ratings-makers for the music TV channels, so I'm positive they will air the video."

An original version was shot, featuring several "simple motions". Lena Katina is shown in a cafe, engaging in numerous simple activities such as drinking water, flipping book pages, and stirring her tea whilst talking on her phone. Several shots showed Yulia Volkova naked in a bathtub masturbating. However, Shapovalov stated in an interview that he had to censor it, saying "[We] decided to censor the masturbation scene, leaving in only a shot of Yulia's face at the moment she has an orgasm." Volkova's nudity was exploited further in leaked clips; after she removed her top, her breasts were exposed while she masturbated.

== Track list and formats ==
Album version

1. "A Simple Motion" – 2:47

The Remixes

1. "A Simple Motion (GunSlungLow Remix)" – 4:13
2. "A Simple Motion (Planet Purple Remix)" – 4:00

== Release history ==
Region	Date	Format	Label
United States	10 November 2012	Digital download	Universal Music Russia, Cherrytree/Interscope
Austria	10 November 2012	Digital download	Universal Music Russia, Cherrytree/Interscope
Australia	10 November 2012	Digital download	Universal Music Russia, Cherrytree/Interscope
Italy	10 November 2012	Digital download	Universal Music Russia, Cherrytree/Interscope
New Zealand	10 November 2012	Digital download	Universal Music Russia, Cherrytree/Interscope
Netherlands	10 November 2012	Digital download	Universal Music Russia, Cherrytree/Interscope
Spain	10 November 2012	Digital download	Universal Music Russia, Cherrytree/Interscope
Switzerland	10 November 2012	Digital download	Universal Music Russia, Cherrytree/Interscope
