= Neposedy =

Russian children's music group

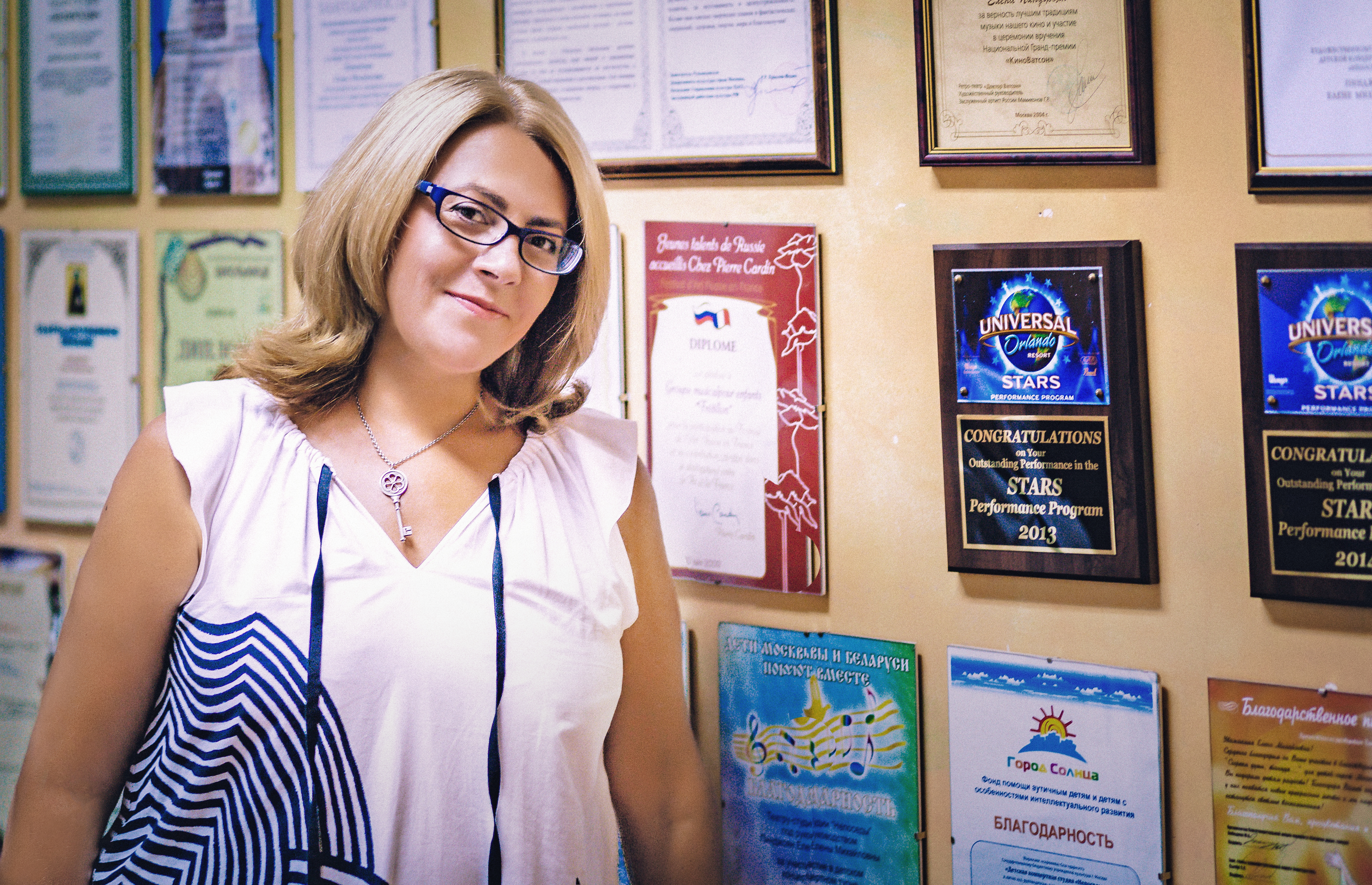
- Elena Pindzhoyan in the Neposedy studio

Background information
- Origin: Moscow, Russia
- Genres: children's music
- Years active: 1991–present
- Members: various
- Past members: including: Julia Volkova; Lena Katina; Sergey Lazarev; Vlad Topalov; Julia Malinovskaya; Nastya Zadorozhnaja; Kristian Kostov

Neposedy (Russian: Непоседы, IPA: [nʲɪpɐˈsʲedɨ]; lit. 'Fidgets') is a children's music group formed in Moscow, Russia in 1991 by Elena Pindzhoyan and later supported by Yuri Nikolaev. Although starting out with a group of 15 children that rotated per performance, the group later did not have a fixed membership and hundreds of children have been estimated to have been part of Neposedy at some stage during its history.

== History ==
Neposedy was founded by then 22-year-old Elena Pindzhoyan as a children's club at Moscow's Leningrad district's local Pioneers Palace, focusing on children's music. Initially, Neposedy was founded as Pindzhoyan's graduation project at the Moscow State Art and Cultural University. Among the first members of Neposedy were 3-year-old Anna Topalova and her older brother Vlad Topalov, Vsevolod Polishchuk, Yulya and Alyona Malinovskaya, Evgeniya Tremasova, Kseniya Tremasova, Mari Suare and Evgeniya Letichevskaya.

In 1992, the group received nationwide recognition as one of the regular and most successful participants in the television programme Morning Star. Not much later, Sergey Lazarev, Anastasiya Zadorozhnaya, Lena Katina and Julia Volkova started appearing as part the group as well. The group appeared regularly in Morning Star until 1997, as the group was likened by the show's host Yuri Nikolaev.

Since 2002, Neposedy also incorporated musical theatre for children into their studio. In 2006, the group released a CD titled We are 15 years!, a celebration of the group's 15 year anniversary, including a cover of Jessica Simpson's song "Irresistible".

In 2016, the group celebrated its 25th anniversary, giving a large concert. The concert was titled Nas ne dogonyat, after the epyonous t.A.T.u. single and was later broadcast by Channel One Russia. In this concert, several current and past Neposedy members appeared, including Volkova, Katina and Topalov.

== Past members ==
Among its first members, Neposedy knew several young singers that later became successful artists in Russia. Julia Volkova and Lena Katina initially formed the duo t.A.T.u., receiving worldwide fame with singles as "All The Things She Said" and "Not Gonna Get Us". Vlad Topalov and Sergey Lazarev attained commercial success as part of Smash!!. Bulgarian-Russian singer Kristian Kostov has been part of Neposedy.

== Discography ==
- 1997: Pust' mirom pravit lyubov
- 2001: 10 let - luchsheye
- 2005: Vzroslyye i deti
- 2006: Nam 15 let!
