= Not Gonna Get Us =

2003 single by t.A.T.u.

Single by t.A.T.u.

from the album 200 km/h in the Wrong Lane
- B-side: "Ne ver, ne boysya"
- Released: 3 February 2003
- Genre: Eurodance; breakbeat
- Length: 4:21 (album version); 3:37 (radio edit 1); 3:19 (radio edit 2)
- Label: Universal; Interscope
- Songwriters: Sergio Galoyan; Trevor Horn; Elena Kiper; Valery Polienko
- Producer: Trevor Horn

t.A.T.u. singles chronology
| "All the Things She Said" (2002) | "Not Gonna Get Us" (2003) | "How Soon Is Now?" (2003) |

Music videos
- "Not Gonna Get Us" on YouTube "Nas Ne Dogonyat" on YouTube

"Not Gonna Get Us" is a song by the Russian music duo t.A.T.u. for their first English-language album, 200 km/h in the Wrong Lane (2002). Interscope Records released it on 3 February 2003 as the second single from the album. It was originally released as "Nas Ne Dogonyat" (Russian: Нас не догонят, IPA: [nas nʲe dɐˈɡonʲət]; translation: "[They] Won't Catch Us") on t.A.T.u.'s debut album, 200 По Встречной (2001). The song was written by Sergio Galoyan, Trevor Horn, Elena Kiper and Valery Polienko, while production was handled by Horn. "Not Gonna Get Us" is a Eurodance-inspired song, and lyrically it talks about the group running away from people as they don't understand their love towards one another. The song was included on the duo's compilation album The Best (2006).

"Not Gonna Get Us" received mixed reviews from music critics. It was a commercial success, peaking inside the top-ten in countries including Finland, Italy, Austria, Sweden, Belgium, Ireland and the United Kingdom. The single also reached number one on the US Billboard Dance Club Songs chart, becoming the duo's only number-one single on the US component charts.

An accompanying music video was filmed for the single directed by Ivan Shapovalov, who appears in a cameo. The song has been performed on all of the duo's concert tours and was also performed at the 2003 MTV Movie Awards. In 2009, t.A.T.u. played a special concert featuring the song at the Eurovision Song Contest with a Russian Army Choir, the Alexandrov Ensemble. In February 2014, during the opening ceremony of the Olympic Games in Sochi, t.A.T.u. performed "Нас не догонят". Additionally, the song was sung later in the ceremony when Russia's competitors entered the stadium.

== Background and composition ==
The song was written by Elena Kiper, Ivan Shapovalov, Valeriy Polienko and Sergio Galoyan, while production was handled by Trevor Horn. The song was added to their YouTube channel five years after its release on 6 February 2008.

"Not Gonna Get Us" is a eurodance-inspired song. The song incorporates influences from pop, dance-pop, eurodance and rock music. Lyrically, it talks about teenage lovers, which was usually exampled by Volkova and Katina, as people did not understand their love towards each other, so they run away from people to start fresh.

== Critical reception ==
"Not Gonna Get Us" received mixed reviews from music critics. Stephen Thomas Erlewine from Allmusic highlighted the track on the album saying it was an "exhausting offering hit" but continued saying; "Well, it's easy not to be into it when Julia and Lena appear to have been run through a marketing processor so they could become two Sapphic tarts who sing songs with suggestive titles like "Not Gonna Get Us", "Show Me Love" and "All the Things She Said" (it's likely a coincidence that the latter two share titles with songs by Robyn and Simple Minds, respectively, but perhaps not) [...]." Popdirt commented that the "high-pitched helium voices" on the song work at "complementing the sensitivity they feel for each other and the reckless abandonment of the outside world perfectly". Pitchfork listed this as the 33rd best single of 2003.

The song was nominated "Best Russian Act" on the 2003 MTV Europe Music Awards.

== Chart performance ==
"Not Gonna Get Us" was first released in Europe in 2003. In the United Kingdom, it debuted and peaked at number seven. It remained in the charts for eight weeks, selling over 43,000 copies. The song also peaked at number ten on the Irish Singles Chart. In Sweden, it debuted at number ten, peaked at number nine and stayed in the charts for nine weeks. In Finland, it debuted at number three and stayed in the charts for five weeks. In Italy, it debuted at number four and stayed in the charts for a total of seven weeks. In Austria, it debuted at number 22. After two weeks, it rose and peaked at number five for two non-consecutive weeks. It stayed in the charts for sixteen weeks in total. In Switzerland, the song debuted at number 37. The next week, it rose and peaked at 18, and stayed in the charts for 18 weeks in total. The song peaked at numbers twelve and ten in Belgium (Flanders and Wallonia). The song reached number ten in the Europe Official Top 100.

In Oceania, it received more moderate success. The song debuted and peaked at number 11 on the Australian Singles Chart, remaining in the charts for 11 weeks. It was certified gold by ARIA for selling over 35,000 copies. The song spent only a sole week in the New Zealand Singles Chart, where it peaked at number 25, becoming the group's poorest performing single in the country. It was the group's last single to chart in New Zealand.

The song was eventually released in North America, charting in Canada and the United States. The single version peaked at number 31 on the US Hot Dance Club Songs chart. Dave Audé then released a remix of the single in the United States, which peaked at number one on the US Hot Dance Club Songs Chart, where it became the group's first and only number one in North America. Not Gonna Get Us also managed to peak at 35 on the US Top 40 Mainstream Charts.

== Music video ==
t.A.T.u. in the "Not Gonna Get Us" music video

The video starts off with Julia and Lena's mugshots being placed on screen, with the truck's engine starting up and steam surrounding the two girls and the vehicle. They then are outside in a snowy environment, where they steal a large truck and ride off through an airfield, breaking through a fence while singing. The two girls later find themselves in snow-covered Siberia. They run over a construction worker in the middle of the road, who is played by Ivan Shapovalov. After breaking through another fence, some family photos of both the girls as young children are shown during the video. Towards the end, Yulia and Lena climb to the roof of the truck and stand on top, hugging and smiling as they continue to sing the song, until they crack the lens of the camera as they leave.

The video was directed by their former producer Ivan Shapovalov. The music video is a re-edited version of the original video "Nas Ne Dogonyat", altered to remove the lip syncing (usually by adding a broken glass shot over the shots of them singing).

== Media appearances ==
The words "нас не догонят" made their way into 2006 Russian Dictionary of Modern Quotes (Slovar sovremennykh tsitat).

== Track listings ==
European CD single

1. "Not Gonna Get Us" (radio version) – 3:38
2. "Not Gonna Get Us" (Dave Audé's Extension 119 vocal edit) – 3:54

European and Australian maxi-CD single

1. "Not Gonna Get Us" (radio version) – 3:38
2. "Not Gonna Get Us" (Dave Audé's Extension 119 vocal edit) – 3:54
3. "All the Things She Said" (DJ Monk After Skool Special) – 6:04
4. "All the Things She Said" (Blackpulke remix) – 4:13
5. "Not Gonna Get Us" (video) – 4:13
- On the Australian CD, the DJ Monk After Skool Special version of "All the Things She Said" is labelled as the "DJ Monk Breaks" mix

French CD single – "Not Gonna Get Us (Part 2)"

1. "Not Gonna Get Us" (original version extended mix by Guéna LG & RLS) – 6:20
2. "Not Gonna Get Us" (Generates-A-Yippee mix by Guéna LG & RLS) – 6:56
3. "Not Gonna Get Us" (Hardrum Mix re-edit by Guéna LG & RLS) – 5:39
4. "Not Gonna Get Us" (Larry Tee Electroclash mix) – 6:17
5. "Not Gonna Get Us" (Richard Morel's Pink Noise vocal mix) – 8:09

UK CD single

1. "Not Gonna Get Us" (radio version) – 3:36
2. "Ne Ver, Ne Boisia" (Eurovision 2003) – 3:03
3. "All the Things She Said" (Running & Spinning mix) – 6:12
4. "Not Gonna Get Us" (CD-ROM video)

UK cassette single

1. "Not Gonna Get Us" (radio version) – 3:36
2. "All the Things She Said" (Running & Spinning mix) – 6:12

Japanese CD single

1. "Not Gonna Get Us" (radio version)
2. "Not Gonna Get Us" (Dave Audé's Extension 119 vocal edit)
3. "All the Things She Said" (TV track—karaoke version)
4. "Not Gonna Get Us" (video)

== Charts ==
=== Weekly charts ===
Weekly chart performance for "Not Gonna Get Us"
| Chart (2002–2003) | Peak position |
|---|---|
| Australia (ARIA) | 11 |
| Austria (Ö3 Austria Top 40) | 5 |
| Belgium (Ultratop 50 Flanders) | 12 |
| Belgium (Ultratop 50 Wallonia) | 10 |
| Chile (Notimex) | 5 |
| Costa Rica (Notimex) | 5 |
| Czech Republic (IFPI) "Nas Ne Dogonyat" | 7 |
| Europe (Eurochart Hot 100) | 13 |
| Finland (Suomen virallinen lista) | 3 |
| France (SNEP) | 18 |
| Germany (GfK) | 15 |
| Greece (IFPI) | 3 |
| Hungary (Rádiós Top 40) | 25 |
| Ireland (IRMA) | 10 |
| Italy (FIMI) | 4 |
| Netherlands (Dutch Top 40) | 12 |
| Netherlands (Single Top 100) | 11 |
| New Zealand (Recorded Music NZ) | 25 |
| Norway (VG-lista) | 12 |
| Romania (Romanian Top 100) "Nas Ne Dogonyat" | 1 |
| Scotland Singles (OCC) | 8 |
| Spain (Promusicae) | 12 |
| Sweden (Sverigetopplistan) | 9 |
| Switzerland (Schweizer Hitparade) | 18 |
| UK Singles (OCC) | 7 |
| US Dance Club Songs (Billboard) Remixes | 1 |
| US Pop Airplay (Billboard) | 35 |

=== Year-end charts ===
2003 year-end chart performance for "Not Gonna Get Us"
| Chart (2003) | Position |
|---|---|
| Austria (Ö3 Austria Top 40) | 49 |
| Belgium (Ultratop 50 Flanders) | 86 |
| Belgium (Ultratop 50 Wallonia) | 45 |
| Sweden (Hitlistan) | 67 |
| UK Singles (OCC) | 166 |
| US Dance Club Play (Billboard) | 18 |

== Certifications and sales ==
| Region | Certification | Certified units/sales |
|---|---|---|
| Australia (ARIA) | Gold | 35,000^{^} |
| France | — | 32,456 |
^{^} Shipments figures based on certification alone.

== Release history ==
Release dates and formats for "Not Gonna Get Us"
| Region | Date | Format(s) | Label(s) | Ref. |
|---|---|---|---|---|
| Europe | 3 February 2003 | CD | Interscope | |
| United States | 21 April 2003 | Contemporary hit radio | Interscope | |
| United Kingdom | 19 May 2003 | CD; cassette | Interscope, Polydor | |
| Japan | 11 June 2003 | CD | Interscope | |

== Cover versions and derivatives ==
"Not Gonna Get Us" was sampled in the song "Miss Love Tantei" by W. The song was used as the closing song in the 2009 film, The Code, which had Russian characters and clubs as central to the plot.

The song was covered by Japanese singer Maki Nomiya on her 2005 album Party People.

In 2014, Tori Amos covered the song in Moscow while on her Unrepentant Geraldines Tour.

In 2004, a cover of the song by Eurobeat artist Dave Rodgers was featured on Super Eurobeat Vol.147

== See also ==
- List of number-one dance singles of 2003 (U.S.)
- List of Romanian Top 100 number ones of the 2000s
