= Sergio Galoyan =

Russian producer & DJ (born 1981)

Sergio Galoyan Сергей Галоян
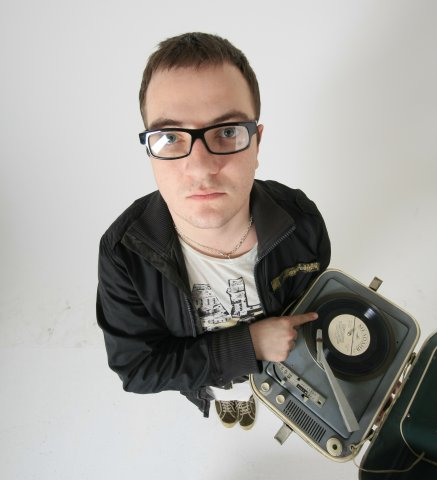

Background information
- Born: December 25, 1981 (age 44); Moscow, Russia
- Genres: Pop; electronic
- Occupation: Producer

Sergey Galoyan (Russian: Сергей Галоян, born 25 December 1981) is an ASCAP/PRS Award–winning songwriter/producer and DJ, born in Moscow. He is more commonly known as Sergio Galoyan and is of Armenian descent.

One of the creators of the band t.A.T.u., he wrote and produced their first four singles All the Things She Said, Not Gonna Get Us, 30 Minutes, and Show Me Love. He also wrote and produced many other tracks for their first, second and third albums.

== Life and career ==
=== Early life and influences ===
Galoyan was born in Moscow on 25 December, 1981, into a musical family; his father was a lead guitarist in a band specializing in Western rock and pop classics. Early in his childhood, he was exposed to classical music and rock bands such as Led Zeppelin, Black Sabbath, Queen, and The Beatles. His musical direction shifted significantly at age 14 after hearing Metallica's ...And Justice for All, which inspired him to study guitar under the legendary Russian jazz guitarist Dmitry Maloletov, known for the "two-hand tapping" technique.

After two years of guitar study, Galoyan discovered DJing and house music, becoming influenced by acts like Daft Punk, Underworld, The Prodigy, and Chemical Brothers. He taught himself to program music on a Delta-C (Spectrum-compatible) computer using FastTracker. He initially formed a band called "The Noise", where he served as lead guitarist, before beginning to produce his own dance tracks at home. Several of these early recordings were picked up by the influential Moscow dance station, Station 2000.

=== Career and t.A.T.u. ===
In 1999, Galoyan met producer Ivan Shapovalov, which led to his role as the main songwriter and producer for t.A.T.u.'s debut singles: "Ya Soshla S Uma" ("All the Things She Said"), "Nas Ne Dogonyat" ("Not Gonna Get Us"), "Polchasa" ("30 Minutes"), and "Show Me Love." He also contributed six tracks to the group's 2005 second international album, Dangerous and Moving.

Galoyan has since worked with Keith Flint (The Prodigy), Marilyn Manson, Jennifer Lopez, Valeriya, Clea Halsey and Alsou (on 19).

Galoyan is currently concentrating on his solo DJ project under the name of Sergio Galoyan, which features various vocalists and songwriters from around the world. He is based in Krasnaya Polyana where he works with up-and-coming musicians.

In 2022, Galoyan released the Sargas EP. The music video for the title track was directed by Sofia Rikani and features anime-style characterizations of t.A.T.u. members Julia Volkova and Lena Katina.

In 2025, Galoyan released a Gothic House track Wide Gate, created in collaboration with Ave Trio and featuring the operatic vocals of Alexander Korenkov. This was followed by the release of Found Love, a song originally written for Julia Volkova in 2015 but eventually re-recorded with the artist Drax. The accompanying music video, directed by Maria Skobeleva, debuted in late 2025.

Sparked by its prominent inclusion in the Canadian TV series Heated Rivalry, "All The Things She Said" has achieved a viral comeback in late 2025, racking up over 700 million Spotify streams as U.S. listenership surged by 135% and a 200% spike in new listeners—60% of whom are Gen Z—pushed the original track and its Harrison cover version back onto the global charts.

=== Education and directing ===
Galoyan received his higher education at the Russian Institute of Theatre Arts (GITIS), where he studied in the academic department of theatrical production.

In addition to his music production, Galoyan has worked as a director for various visual projects; he directed the music video for his single "Everything" featuring Nire' Alldai, as well as the video for the song "Yad" (Poison) by the singer Nicoletta.

=== Legal disputes and t.A.T.u. friction ===
Despite his foundational role in t.A.T.u.'s success, Galoyan's relationship with the group's management and the members themselves has been characterized by intermittent litigation and public disputes. Early in the band's career, he criticized producer Ivan Shapovalov’s management style, alleging that the young members were exploited and paid disproportionately low royalties.

==== Defamation Lawsuit (2001) ====
Following the release of the debut album 200 Po Vstrechnoy, Galoyan filed a lawsuit against Neformat LLC and Universal Music Russia. The album's booklet was styled as a criminal case file and claimed Galoyan had been "detained" in connection with the disappearance of Katina and Volkova. Galoyan argued this was defamatory and harmful to his reputation, particularly as it leaned into stereotypes of "ethnic Armenian bandits." In October 2001, a court ruled in his favor, ordering the withdrawal of the booklets and the payment of damages.

==== Tribute Album and Performance Bans (2021–2026) ====
Conflict resurfaced in late 2021 during the production of the tribute album 200 Po Vstrechnoy. Although Galoyan was a primary collaborator on the release, he publicly clashed with Lena Katina after she announced a solo "tribute" concert for 2022. Galoyan characterized the move as an attempt to bypass the original creators and issued a formal legal ban prohibiting Katina from performing any of his compositions, including "All the Things She Said" and "Not Gonna Get Us."

In an interview in January 2026, Galoyan provided further insight into the friction; he claimed that the duo had initially "tried to stop" the Lookport tribute show and had requested significant financial compensation to participate. The rift remained unresolved, he stated that he is waiting for a formal apology from Katina to repair their "internal relationship" before he would consider writing new material for the duo.

== Personal life ==
He married t.A.T.u.'s PR manager, Sasha Tityanko, after working on t.A.T.u.'s second album, but they divorced soon after.

== Discography ==
=== As an artist ===
Singles

- 2010: Everything - Sergio Galoyan (feat. Nire' Alldai)
- 2011: Knowing You - Sergio Galoyan (feat. Tamra Keenan)
- 2011: Break The Night In Two - Sergio Galoyan (feat. Antonio)
- 2011: Stay Hungry, Stay Foolish - Sergio Galoyan
- 2012: Paradise - Sergio Galoyan (feat. Lena Katina)

=== As a composer/producer ===
- 2000: Ya Soshla S Uma (Я Сошла С Ума) (I've Lost My Mind) - t.A.T.u.
- 2001: Nas Ne Dogonyat (Нас Не Догонят) (Not Gonna Get Us) - t.A.T.u.
- 2001: 30 Minut (30 Минут) (30 Minutes) (also called Polchasa) - t.A.T.u.
- 2001: Ya Tvoya Ne Pervaya (Я Твоя Не Первая) (I Am Not Your First) (also called Pokazhi Mne Lyubov) - t.A.T.u.
- 2001: Mal'chik-Gey (Mальчик-Гей) (Gay Boy) - t.A.T.u.
- 2002: Not Gonna Get Us - t.A.T.u.
- 2002: All the Things She Said - t.A.T.u.
- 2002: Show Me Love - t.A.T.u.
- 2002: 30 Minutes - t.A.T.u.
- 2002: Malchik Gay - t.A.T.u.
- 2002: Ya Soshla S Uma - t.A.T.u.
- 2002: Nas Ne Dogonyat - t.A.T.u.
- 2005: Cosmos (Outer Space) – t.A.T.u.
- 2005: Sacrifice – t.A.T.u.
- 2005: Perfect Enemy – t.A.T.u.
- 2005: Vsya Moya Lyubov (Вся Моя Любовь) – t.A.T.u.
- 2008: Marsianskie Glaza (Марсианские Глаза) (Martian Eyes) – t.A.T.u.
- 2008: Wild - Valeriya
- 2008: Break it All - Valeriya
- 2008: I Know - Valeriya
- 2008: Out of Control - Valeriya
- 2008: Love Sick - Valeriya
- 2008: Here I Am - Valeriya
- 2008: No One - Valeriya
- 2008: There I’ll Be - Valeriya
- 2008: Where Are You? - Valeriya
- 2008: Romantic - Valeriya
- 2013: Paradise — Lena Katina
- 2013: Kosmos — Vintage
- 2019: Nightmare — Halsey

=== Remixes ===
- 2001: Ya Soshla S Uma (Sergio Galoyan Mix) - t.A.T.u.
- 2002: Dozhd (Sergio Galoyan Mix) - Alsou
- 2003: I'm Glad (Sergio Galoyan Mix) - Jennifer Lopez
- 2004: Download It (Sergio Dance Edit) - Clea (band)
- 2005: This Is the New *hit (Sergio Galoyan Mix) - Marilyn Manson
- 2006: No Numbers (Sergio Galoyan Version) - Keith Flint
- 2010: Love Dealer (Sergio Galoyan Mix) - Justin Timberlake Feat. Esmee Denters

=== List Of Achievements By Year ===
- 2000 Russia/Video Clip/Song "Ya Soshla S Uma"/ 1st place/Top of the Charts on TV Channels, Radio Channels
- 2001 Russia/Song "Nas Ne Dogonyat"/ 1st place/Top of the Charts on TV Channels, Radio Channels
- 2001 Russia/Album Release "200 Po Vstrechnoy"/ 1st place/Top of the Charts on TV Channels, Radio Channels, Record Sale
- 2001 Hit FM award "100 Pound Hit" for "Ya Soshla S Uma" https://web.archive.org/web/20080408095007/http://gallery.tatushow.com/displayimage.php?album=737&pos=1
- 2001 Russia/Song "30 Minut"/ 1st place/Top of the Charts on TV Channels, Radio Channels, Record Sale
- 2002 Worldwide/ Release of English Version of the Album "200 Km in a Wrong Lane/ 1st place worldwide/Top of the Charts in Most of the Countries in the World/Record Sale/Top on Official Music and Country Charts
- 2002 Worldwide/Single of the Song "All Things She Said"/ Record Sale 1st place/Top ono the Official Music and Country Charts/Record
- 2002 Hit FM - award "100 Pound Hit" for "Nas Ne Dogonyat"
- 2002 Ovaciya Award - Best song of the year "Nas Ne Dogonyat"
- 2002 Russian Grammy Awards - Best Song "Nas Ne Dogonyat"
- 2002 IFPI Platinum Europe Award for 1 million sales of the album "200 Po Vstrechnoy" https://web.archive.org/web/20131016055449/http://www.ifpi.org/content/section_news/plat2002.html
- 2003 Worldwide/Single of the Song "Not Gonna Get Us"/ Record Sale 1st place/Top ono the Official Music and Country Charts/Record
- 2003 Russia/Remix on Song by Alsou "Dojd"/ 1st Place on Radio and Television/Top One on the Charts in Russia
- 2003 IFPI Platinum Europe Award for 1 million sales of the album 200 km/h in the Wrong Lane. https://web.archive.org/web/20131103083215/http://www.ifpi.org/content/section_news/plat2003.html
- 2003 Polish Internet Music Awards - Best International Album 200 km/h in the Wrong Lane http://eng.tatysite.net/news/archive.php?id=608_0_5_0
- 2003 IFPI Hong Kong Top Sales Music Awards - Top 10 Best Selling Foreign Albums 200 km/h in the Wrong Lane
- Eska Music Awards «Best International Album» «200 km/h in the Wrong Lane»
- 2004 Award from the American Society of Composers, Authors and

Publishers (ASCAP Award) for Song "All Things She Said" as one of the best songs of the year

- 2004 College Song of the Year (BMI Honors)

Winners "All the Things She Said"

- 2004 BMI Pop Award (BMI Honors) Winners "All the Things She Said"
- 2004 Japan Gold Disc Award - Rock Album of the Year 200 km/h in the Wrong Lane http://www.riaj.or.jp/e/data/gdisc/2004.html
- 2007 Russia/Single Song "Mi Vmeste" performed by Valeria 1st Place on Radio/Song received three awards in Russia: Song of the

Year Award/Record of the Year/Russian Grammy (Golden Gramafon")

- 2008 Russia/Single Song "Wild" performed by Valeria/ 1st Place on Radio and TV/Song was awarded platinum status in Russian
- 2008 Release of Album by Valeria on an international level, which included songs "Mi Vmeste" and "Wild". Song "Wild" was awarded 21st Place in the American Chart "Billboard" and 11th Place in the British Chart "Music Week"
- 2008 Russia/ Release of Single Song "Break It All" performed by Valeria Top 5 songs in Russia
- 2008 Russia/Release of Single Song "I Know" performed by Valeria Top Ten Songs in Russia
- 2008 Viva Channel Germany #3 For "All the Things She Said" in The biggest hits ever
- 2009 Received Medal "Talent and Calling" by "International Alliance Peacemaker" Organization
- 2010 Russia/Produced a Single Song "Noch" performed by Jasmin Top Ten Songs in Russia on TV and Radio
- 2011 Eastern Europe/Single Song "Sergio Galayan feat. Nire Alldai – "Everything" Top Five on Radio and TV in Russia, Ukraine and Eastern Europe
- 2011 Received Medal 2nd Degree for "Talent and Calling" by "International Alliance Peacemaker" Organization
- 2011 Received Medal from "Emperor Society of Russia" Organization as a Recognition of Artistic Talent
- 2012 United States/Release of Song "Sergio Galayan feat. Tamra Keenan – Knowing You" in the United States and Rotating on the several radio channels in the United States
- 2014 Olympic Committee of Russian Federation Selected Song "Nas Ne Dogonyat" as Anthem of Russian Olympic Team. Song was played during Opening of Olympic Games in Sochi and During Introduction of the Russian Olympic Team

The same song was selected as an anthem for Russian Olympic Team during the Paralympic Games in Sochi.

The same song was selected as an anthem for Russian Hockey Team during International Championships.
