= Universal Music Russia =

Russian record label

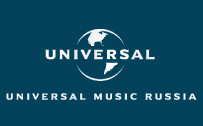
- Parent company: Universal Music Group
- Founded: 17 March 1994; 32 years ago (as PolyGram Russia)
- Founder: Boris Zosimov
- Defunct: 9 March 2022; 4 years ago
- Status: Inactive
- Distributors: Universal Music Group (Internationally); Self-distributed (Russia)
- Genre: Various
- Country of origin: Russia
- Location: Moscow, Russia
- Official website: Archived official website at the Wayback Machine (archived 12 December 2022)

Universal Music Russia (Russian: ООО «Юниверсал Мьюзик») was a Russian music label division of the international music holding company Universal Music Group. The label's artists include Saifer, t.A.T.u., Noize MC, Anna Sedokova, Anna Asti and others. Until January 2021, the head of the label was Dmitry Konnov.

== History ==
In 1998, Boris Zosimov left his post as director general of PolyGram Russia, replaced by Giedrius Klimkevicius, who previously worked as a leader for the distribution company «Бомба».

In 1999, after the merger of PolyGram & Universal Music Group, the label became known as Universal Music Russia.

On 20 January 2021, Maxim Vlasov became the director and Dmitry Konnov left.

On 9 March 2022, the label suspended its activities and closed its offices in Russia. Subsequently, the label's website closed.
