= Vadim Stepantsov =

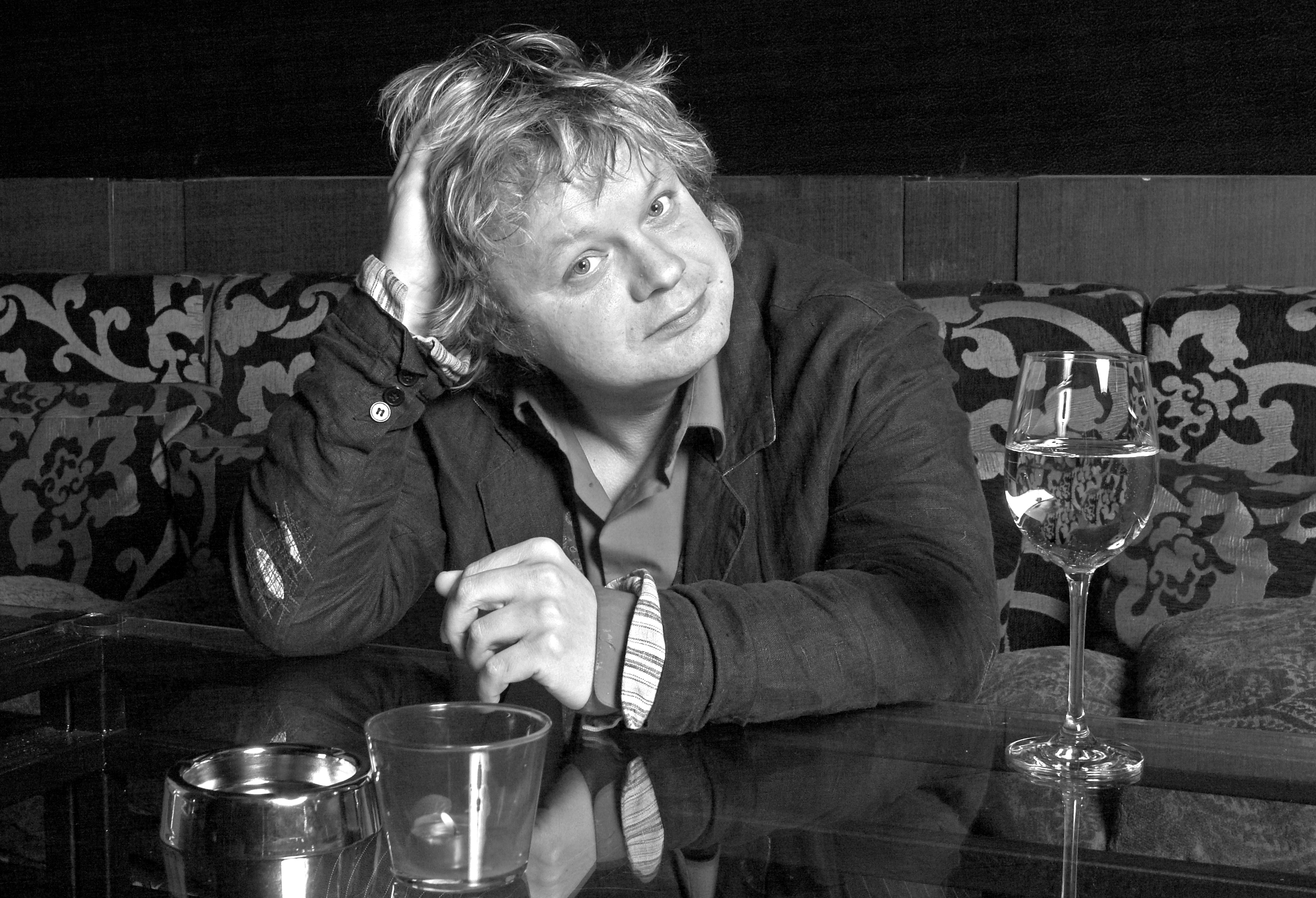

Background information
- Born: 9 September 1960 (age 66); Uzlovaya, Tula Oblast, Soviet Union
- Occupations: singer, musician, poet
- Website: stepantsov.ru

Vadim Yurievich Stepantsov (Russian: Вадим Юрьевич Степанцов; born 9 September 1960) is a Russian poet and musician. Stepantsov is the founder of the Order of Courteous Mannerists and the musical group Bakhyt-Compot. He is also the author of texts for the groups Bravo, Na Na, and t.A.T.u.

Stepantsov is graduated with honors from Maxim Gorky Literature Institute.

== Filmography ==
- 1992 – For the Diamond Spray Jets
- 1994 – Music for December
- 1999 – Who should I – I forgive all
- 2000 – Editorial
- 2001 – Women's Happiness

== Awards ==
- 1996 – Ovation – songwriter
