= Mars Lasar =

Composer

Mars Lasar is a German-born keyboardist and composer, raised in Australia. Predominantly new-age, his music also contains elements of electronica, jazz, pop, world, and rock. Lasar's music has appeared on television and in films; one notable example is music from his first album, Olympus, being used for CBS's coverage of the Olympic Games in Albertville, France in 1992. He has worked with other artists including Seal, Herbie Hancock, Jon Stevens, John Sykes, and t.A.T.u. Many of his album covers feature his own artwork.

In 2019, Mars released the second of his 8-minute MindScapes series.

== Early life ==
When Lasar was eleven, he began to learn piano, and was trained extensively in jazz and classical. It was his mother, a classical artist from Germany, who ignited a love for music in him. Lasar has been interested in technology as long as he can remember. Using a stopwatch, a cassette player, and a shortwave radio, he demonstrated multi-track sequencing before it was ever invented.

His mother was also partly the reason for his interest in art, and he began hanging his original oil paintings around his high school in the 80's.

When Lasar was fifteen, he received the "Young Composers Award" sponsored by the Sydney Opera House. It was at this age that he discovered his interest in blending music and technology which soon led him into working and composing for the President of Fairlight Computers.

He was discovered by Fairlight while being a part of a band of members who loved music, mathematics, and technology equally. As a band in the late 70's and early 80's, they used synthesizers, monophonic sequencers, drum machines, and vocals and would dress up in spacesuits when they performed.

== Career ==
His work with the Fairlight CMI was extensive, and he recalls, "I spent countless hours building the first sample library. I composed many compositions using my sequencing method which was sent out to the world with the machines at $80,000 a piece. I demonstrated the Fairlight to many artists and producers including Alan Parsons, Kate Bush, Duran Duran, Herbie Hancock and many others at that time."

Due to his work with Fairlight CMI, Mars attracted much attention and went on to create compositions for companies, such as Kleenex, Duracell, and Chrysler. In addition, he created compositions for television, such as Equal Justice and Baywatch, and the NFL.

His early experience scoring movies came from his project with Sounds Like Australia (1987), a wildlife movie that required him to rework the sounds of Australian wildlife into music.

In the following years, Lasar worked with Hans Zimmer on the movie, Days of Thunder, starring Tom Cruise. Shortly after, Lasar was asked to help with composing an album with Seal, a new artist at the time. That album earned a Grammy nomination.

Lasar released his first solo album in 1991 and now has over 30 solo albums as well as a collection of collaborative projects. Mars' music has been featured in shows such as Conviction (NBC), 24 (Fox), America's Got Talent, Extreme Makeover, The Bachelor, and others.

== Discography ==
=== Meditation and MindScapes Series ===
year	title	label	notes
1996	Mindscapes, Vol.1 – Fields of Gold	Sound Manipulations	
1996	Mindscapes, Vol.2 – Moonlight	Sound Manipulations	
1996	Mindscapes, Vol.3 – Satin 3	Sound Manipulations	
2008	Mindscapes, Vol.4 – Divine Spark	Sound Manipulations	
2008	Mindscapes, Vol.5 – Eterna	Sound Manipulations	
2008	Mindscapes, Vol.6 – Presence	Sound Manipulations	
2008	Mindscapes, Vol.7 – Transformation	Sound Manipulations	
2008	Mindscapes, Vol.8 – Inner Purpose	Sound Manipulations	
2009	8 Minute MindScapes	Sound Manipulations	eight-minute excerpts from volumes 1–8
2019	8 Minute MindScapes Meditation II]	Sound Manipulations	
2020	Mindscapes Beyond	Sound Manipulations	

=== Solo Piano ===
year	title	label	notes
1998	Sapphire Dreams	Real Music	
2011	Piano Moods From Mars	Sound Manipulations	
2015	Piano Moods From Mars 2	Sound Manipulations	

=== Motivational ===
year	title	label	notes
2003	Final Frontier	Sound Manipulations	
2010	Final Frontier 2	Sound Manipulations	

=== Nature Series ===
year	title	label	notes
1996	Olympic National Park	Real Music	
2006	Yosemite Valley of the Giants	Sound Manipulations	
2009	Tahoe Spirit	Sound Manipulations	

=== World Series ===
year	title	label	notes
2003	Karma	Sound Manipulations	
2013	AfterWorld	Sound Manipulations	

=== Chilled Electronic and Eleventh Hour Series ===
year	title	label	notes
1993	The Eleventh Hour (11.01)	Real Music	
1998	11.02	Sound Manipulations	
2000	11.03 – When Worlds Collide	Sound Manipulations	
2004	11.04 – Panorama	Sound Manipulations	
2005	11.22 – Arrival	Sound Manipulations	
2008	11.05 – Revival	Sound Manipulations	
2020	Multiverse	Sound Manipulations	
2021	Ultra Chill	Sound Manipulations	

=== New Age ===
year	title	label	notes
1992	Olympus	Real Music	
1995	Escape	Real Music	
2000	Blue Maze	Sound Manipulations	
2003	Nocturnal Diaries	Sound Manipulations	
2007	At the End of the Day	Sound Manipulations	
2020	Coastal Escape	Sound Manipulations	

=== Electronica ===
year	title	label	notes
2000	Big Box	Sound Manipulations	
2007	Vertical Velocity	Sound Manipulations	
2010	Organized Chaos	Sound Manipulations	
2010	Organized Chaos 2	Sound Manipulations	
2012	Organized Chaos 3	Sound Manipulations	
2017	Utopia	Sound Manipulations	

=== Holiday ===
year	title	label	notes
2001	Christmas From Mars	Sound Manipulations	
2007	Christmas From Mars Lasar – A Star is Born	Sound Manipulations	

=== Babyscape and Baby Escape Series ===
year	title	label	notes
1996	BabyScapes	Sound Manipulations	
2008	Baby Escapes, Vol.1	Sound Manipulations	
2008	Baby Escapes, Vol.2	Sound Manipulations	
2008	Baby Escapes, Vol.3	Sound Manipulations	
2008	Baby Escapes, Vol.4	Sound Manipulations	
2008	Baby Escapes, Vol.5	Sound Manipulations	
2008	Baby Escapes, Vol.6	Sound Manipulations	
2008	Baby Escapes, Vol.7	Sound Manipulations	
2008	Baby Escapes, Vol.8	Sound Manipulations	

=== Compilations ===
year	title	label	notes
2003	Collaborations	Sound Manipulations	
2008	Exotic Intimacy	Sound Manipulations	
2008	Total Intimacy	Sound Manipulations	
2008	Romantic Collection	Sound Manipulations	
2008	Grooves From Mars 1	Sound Manipulations	
2008	Grooves From Mars 2	Sound Manipulations	
2009	In-Flight Metro	Sound Manipulations	
2009	In-Flight Relax	Sound Manipulations	
2010	Natural	Sound Manipulations	
2010	Jog	Sound Manipulations	
2016	Jazz From Mars	Sound Manipulations	
