= Valery Polienko =

Russian composer

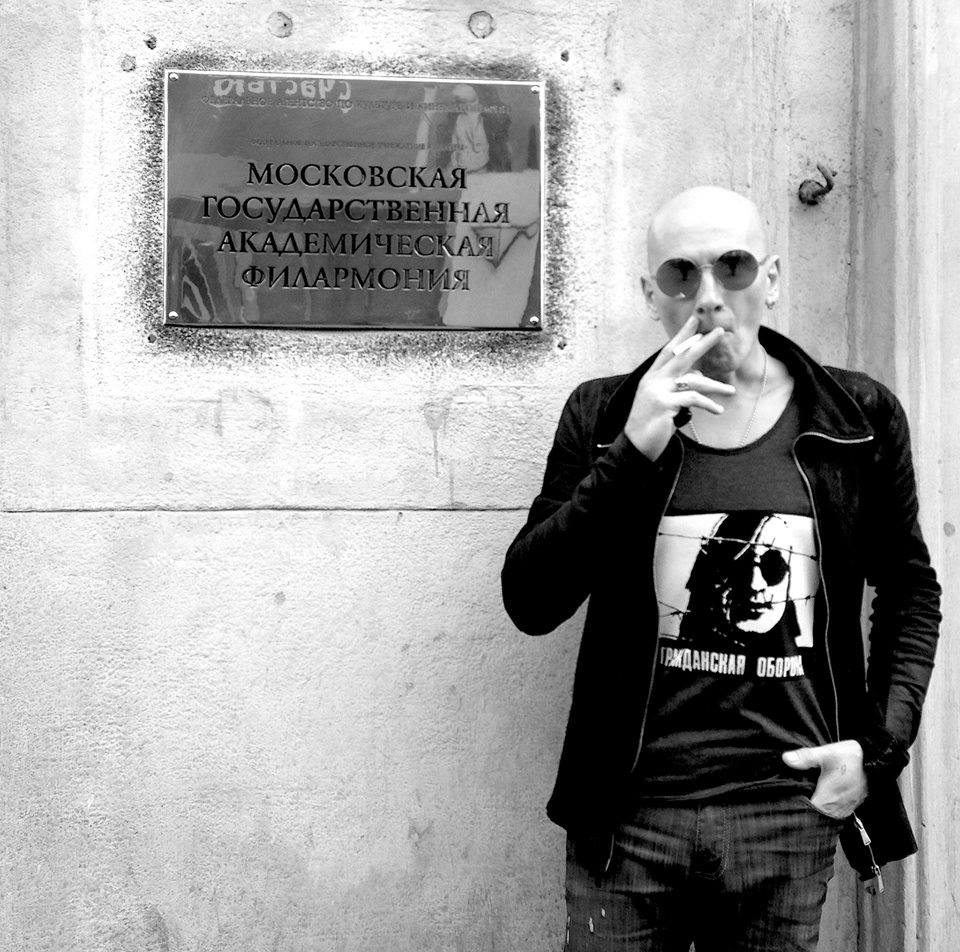

Valery Valentinovich Polienko (Russian: Валерий Валентинович Полиенко; born October 17, 1974, Taganrog, Soviet Union) is a Russian director, poet, composer and producer.

Author and co-author of lyrics for bands t.A.T.u. (Ya Soshla S Uma, Nas Ne Dogonyat, A Simple Motion, Ne Ver', Ne Boysia and others) and Zveri. Screenwriter and director of commercials and music videos.
