= Podnebesnaya No. 1 =

Compilation album by Various artists
- Released: 2004
- Recorded: 2004
- Label: Monolit
- Producer: Ivan Shapovalov

Podnebesnaya No. 1 (Cyrillic: Поднебесная № 1) is the compilation album of works produced by Ivan Shapovalov during his project Podnebesnaya. The CD is labeled as t.A.T.u., though the CD was released after the group had split from their manager, and the closest thing to a song by t.A.T.u. on this album is a demo recorded by only Lena. The song "Volodya Putin" by M.A.O caused some controversy in Russia when it was released.

== Track listing ==
1. "Digital Pussy" – Khodarevskiy & Shumkov (Миша Ходаревский, Дима Шумков)
2. "Белочка" ("Belochka") – Lena Katina (credited as t.A.T.u.)
3. "Чорчовон" – ("Chorchovon") n.A.T.o.
4. "Володя Путин" ) –("Volodya Putin") M.A.O
5. "Законы просты" – ("Zakony Prosti") Bonch bru Bonch
6. "Найду" –("Naidu") Helya
7. "Радиошторм" – ("Radishtorm") Khudozhnik
8. "Смысла нет" – ("Smistla Net") Vitya Shimchenko
9. "Планета" – ("Planeta") Orkrist
10. "Не ждала" – ("Ne Zhdala") Katya Nechaeva
11. "Хуй войне" – ("Hui Voine") Masha Makarova
12. "Между небом" – ("Mezhdu Nebom") FlyDream
13. "Inoplaneten" – Ivan Demyan

== Monthly charts ==
Chart (2004)	Peak position
Russian Albums (NFPF)	2
