= This Is Who I Am (Lena Katina album) =

- Standard edition release cover

Studio album by Lena Katina
- Released: 18 November 2014
- Recorded: 2009–2014; Los Angeles, California, United States and Moscow, Russia
- Genre: Euro Pop; rock; electronic
- Length: 48:56 (English release); 41:08 (Spanish re-release)
- Language: English; Spanish (re-release)
- Label: Katina Music Inc.
- Producer: Katina and Sven Martin (exec.)

Lena Katina chronology
This Is Who I Am (2014)	Моно (2019)

Alternative covers
- Spanish edition release cover

Singles from This Is Who I Am
- 1. "Never Forget" Released: 4 August 2011; 2. "Lift Me Up" Released: 24 September 2013; 3. "Who I Am" Released: 7 October 2014; 4. "An Invitation" Released: 12 March 2015

This Is Who I Am is the debut studio album of the Russian singer-songwriter, Lena Katina, released on 18 November 2014. The album marks the beginning of Katina's solo career after she and her former bandmate, Julia Volkova announced the separation of their music group, t.A.T.u. in 2011. Katina has writing credits on all of the album's songs including those co-written with her ex-husband, Sash Kuzma. Musically, the album is a pop genre with rock influences and lyrically it mostly speaks about discovering herself.

Four singles were released from the album, the first and lead single "Never Forget" reached No. 1 on the MTV Russia Top 10 and also won the said station – 2011 Video of The Year. The remix track of "Never Forget" by Dave Audé also reached No. 1 on the US Billboard Hot Dance Club Play and reached No. 1 in Greece. "Lift Me Up" was released as the second single and the track gained positive feedback from Spanish audiences. The third and fourth singles, "Who I Am" and "An Invitation", have been successful in several European countries such as Germany, Italy, Spain and Katina's homeland, Russia.

This Is Who I Am received both positive and negative reviews from critics. The album was released worldwide as a digital download and the physical copy of the CD was released on Katina's official website.

== Background and development ==
When Katina announced the separation of t.A.T.u., she immediately left Russia and went to the United States to find a label and start her solo career. However, several label groups rejected her and Katina said in an interview, "I am trying to find a label, but they don't want me, for some reason..." Despite this, the singer still pursued her own career through funding it with her own money and was supported by former t.A.T.u.'s executive producer, Boris Renski.

Katina spent a few years in Los Angeles, California recording and writing her first solo album with her band members, Sven Martin, Domen Vajevec, Steve Wilson and Jörg Kohring. It took almost five years to finish the entire album and Katina said in an interview, "It is a good result of a hard work and a long path of becoming a solo singer and a songwriter, of finding myself... I am so happy that my fans are still waiting and I finally have a chance to share my emotions with them through my songs"

This Is Who I Am was released with 13 tracks. Katina was highly involved with the packaging, designing the album with several photos of her with friends, parents and Julia Volkova with her personal handwriting as the caption.

On 15 December 2014, the album was released in Italy with 14 tracks. The Italian edition of the album featured the song "Golden Leaves" with the collaboration of Italian singer, Noemi Smorra.

On 1 July 2016, the album was re-released under the Spanish title, "Esta Soy Yo". The reissued album contains the Spanish translated tracks with three remixes such as "Levántame (Dave Audé Radio Remix)", "No Voy A Olvidarte (Maragakis Remix)" and "Perdida En El Baile (Fly_Dream Remix)" Spanish translated lyrics were done by her friend, Karina Nuvo. On the same date of re-release, Katina announced that she and her team are working for the Russian version of the album.

== Critical reception ==
This Is Who I Am received mixed reviews from critics and fans. "For it's [sic] highs, the album does have a few lows...", the Pop Sun said, adding, "with it's [sic] bad, I would still rate this album pretty favorably because of the highs. It’s definitely an album people should listen to, even if you’re not familiar with Lena Katina."

== Track listing ==
Official track listing

This Is Who I Am – Standard edition
No.	Title	Writer(s)	Producer(s)	Length
1.	"All Around the World"	Lena Katina; Jasmine Ash; Justin Gray	Gray	3:29
2.	"Who I Am"	Katina; Erik Lewander; Iggy Strange Dahl	Lewander; Sven Martin	3:18
3.	"Walking in the Sun"	Katina; Maria Abraham; Jorg Kohring; Martin	Mike Boden	4:11
4.	"The Beast (Inside of You)"	Katina; Martin; Boris Renski; Domen Vajevec; Steve Wilson	Martin; Renski; Vajevec	4:05
5.	"Something I Said"	Katina; Steven Lee; Martin; Sammy Naja; Drew Ryan Scott	Lee; Martin; Naja; Scott	3:45
6.	"Lift Me Up"	Katina; Ash; Jacques Brautbar	Brautbar	3:22
7.	"Fed Up"	Katina; Troy MacCubbin; Martin; Renski; Vajevec; Wilson	Martin; Vajevec; Renski	3:16
8.	"An Invitation"	Katina; Abraham; Kohring; Martin	Martin	3:53
9.	"Just a Day"	Katina; Lene Dissing; MacCubbin; Martin; Renski; Wilson	Martin; Renski; Vajevec	4:41
10.	"Wish on a Star"	Katina; Martin; VASSY	Martin	4:16
11.	"Waiting"	Katina; Sash Kuzma; Martin; Vajevec	Katina; Kuzma; Martin; Vajevec	3:32
12.	"Never Forget"	Katina; Hayden Bell; Sarah Lundbank	Lidbom; Martin	3:34
13.	"Lost in This Dance"	Katina; Martin; Renski; Vajevec; Wilson	Martin; Vajevec; Renski	5:34
Total length:				48:56

This Is Who I Am – Italian edition (bonus track)
No.	Title	Writer(s)	Producer(s)	Length
14.	"Golden Leaves" (Noemi Smorra feat. Lena Katina)	Fernando Alba; Kathleen Hagen	Alessandro Paolinell	3:16
Total length:				52:16

Esta Soy Yo – This Is Who I Am; the Spanish edition (track list)
No.	Title	Length
1.	"Levántame" (Lift Me Up)	3:23
2.	"Caminando en el Sol" (Walking in the Sun)	4:16
3.	"Llamándote" (Running Blind)	3:56
4.	"La Bestia" (The Beast (Inside of You))	4:06
5.	"Quédate" (Stay)	3:29
6.	"No Voy a Olvidarte" (Never Forget)	3:26
7.	"Perdida en el Baile" (Lost in This Dance)	5:36
8.	"Levántame (Dave Audé Radio Remix)"	3:44
9.	"No Voy a Olvidarte (Maragakis Remix)"	4:28
10.	"Perdida en el Baile (Fly_dream Remix)"	6:04
Total length:		41:08

== Personnel ==
- Lena Katina – lead vocals, background vocals, executive producer, writer
- Sven Martin – executive producer, guitars, writer, keyboard, programming
- Jasmine Ash – writer, backing vocals
- Erik Lewander – writer, producer, keyboards, programming
- Iggy Strange Dahl – writer
- Jacques Brautbar – writer. keyboards, guitars, bass, programming
- VASSY – writer
- Erik Lidbom – writer, producer
- Justin Gray – writer, sound mixer, producer, backing vocals, keyboards, programming, guitars, drums, bass
- Boris Renski – producer, writer, recording
- Domen Vajevec – guitars, writer, producer, bass, keyboards, programming
- Jorg Kohring – drums, writer, guitars, backing vocals
- Sash Kuzma – drums, writer, recording, producer, keyboards, programming
- Steve Wilson – bass, drums, writer
- Andre Recke – management
- Dean Beckett – product manager
- Greg Benninger – graphic designer
- Maria Abraham – writer
- Steven Lee – writer, producer, keyboards, programming
- Sammy Naja – writer, producer, keyboards, programming
- Drew Ryan Scott – writer, producer
- Troy MacCubbin – writer, guitars
- Lene Dissing – writer
- Hayden Bell – writer
- Sarah Lundbank – writer
- Veronica Ferraro – sound mixer
- Mike Boden – sound mixer
- Joe Zook – sound mixer
- Ken Lewis – sound mixer
- Nathanael Boone – sound mixer
- Matt Marrin – sound mixer
- Alan Johannes – guitars
- Jeanette Olson – backing vocals
- Nadia Duggin – backing vocals
- Nicole Kehl – backing vocals
- Pelle Hillstrom – guitars
- Fox Fagan – bass
- Bruno Gruel – sound engineer

== Release history ==
Country	Date	Version	Format	Label
Worldwide	18 November 2014	Standard	CD; digital download	Katina Music Inc.
Italy	15 December 2014	Standard	CD	Maqueta Records
Worldwide	1 July 2016	Standard Spanish edition	CD; digital download	Katina Music Inc.
