= Podnebesnaya =

Television series

Podnebesnaya (Cyrillic: Поднебесная; Tr. from Russian: Celestial) was a musical production company organized by producer Ivan Shapovalov. The project for Podnebesnaya, with the same title, began in 2003 in Moscow, Russia. The main purpose of the production was to produce t.A.T.u.'s second studio album, however after a falling-out with Ivan, such production ended. Shapovalov continued to work with other Russian artists including 7B, Helya, Ledokol, FlyDream and n.A.T.o. A CD was released of this project in 2004, after t.A.T.u. split from Shapovalov. The CD was titled Podnebesnaya No. 1, and only featured one song by t.A.T.u. ("Belochka"), although the release capitalized on the fact that it was made during the reality show.

== t.A.T.u. v Podnebesnoy (TV series) ==
t.A.T.u. v Podnebesnoy (t.A.T.u. в Поднебесной, 't.A.T.u in Underheaven') was a 2004 reality documentary show filmed in Russia, that chronicled t.A.T.u. as they were in the process of recording a second album with producer Ivan Shapovalov with his larger project Podnebesnaya. However. the initial recording sessions were mostly unsuccessful, as Ivan began showing more interest in working with his other projects, leaving the girls unsatisfied with management.

A contest was held by STS for fans to send in their own lyrics and demos for the girls to possibly use, but none of them were actually used.

The title of the show is also known as Podnebesnoy, t.A.T.u. Podnebensnoy, and t.A.T.u. V Podnebensnoy. According to the group's official website, Podnebesnaya is translated to "Underheaven", although it is roughly translated to "Celestial".

In October 2025, the songs composed during t.A.T.u. v Podnebesnoy were collected together with other tracks and released by t.A.T.u. in a new album, V Podnebensnoy. Soon afterwards, Shapovalov released the original recordings in an album, t.A.T.u. v Podnebesnoy.

=== Songs recorded by t.A.T.u. during Podnebesnaya ===
- "Podnebesnaya Introduction" - 2:30
- "Poetry (Uncensored Clip)" - 1:05
- "Я буду (Защищаться Очками)" — 2:36 – Had a minor single release
- "Я буду (Защищаться Очками)" (Demo Video Version) — 2:34
- "Belochka" – Elena Katina; (Demo version not same as released version)
- "Belochka" (Demo) — 2:53
- "Belochka" (Released Version)
- "Что Не Хватает" (Commutator Spiritus Version) — 3:45 – [Remix by Commutator Spiritus featuring demo vocal recordings by Elena Katina]
- "Что Не Хватает" — 3:08 – Elena Katina ft. Ivan Dem'yan
- "Я здесь (Всё нормально)" — 2:25 – Elena Katina
- "Я здесь (Всё нормально)" (Studio Version With Ivan Shapovalov and Elena Katina)
- "Я здесь (Всё нормально)" (Leaked Demo)
- "Я здесь (Всё нормально)" (Instrumental)
- "Я здесь (Всё нормально)" — 1:50
- "Я Не Сошла С Ума (Обезьянка Ноль Demo) — 3:11
- "Ты Согласна (Demo 1)" — 3:06
- "Ты Согласна (Demo 2)" — 3:06 [Compared with Demo 1, there are minor vocal alterations in the chorus]
- "Ты Согласна" (Demo 3 feat. Ivan Shapovalov)— 3:05
- "Ты Согласна" (First Version Demo) — 2:48
- "Ты Согласна" (Demo Instrumental) — 3:06
- "В Космосе Сквозняки" — 0:15 – Yulia Volkova
- "В Космосе Сквозняки" — 0:50 – Ivan Shapovalov
- "Люди Инвалиды" — 2:58
- "Обезьянка Ноль" (Podnebesnaya Version) — 4:24
- "Обезьянка Ноль" (Podnebesnaya Instrumental Version) — 4:16
- "Sex" — 1:09 – Composed by FlyDream, song with Girls talking of sex

=== Other notable songs for t.A.T.u. ===
- "Обезьянка Ноль" (Podnebesnaya Instrumental Clip)
- "Люди Инвалиды" (Ivan Shapovalov)
- "Люди Инвалиды" (Vena)
- "Я Выдумал Сам" (Ivan Shapovalov)
- "Все Нормально" (Nekkerman)
