= An Invitation =

Single by Lena Katina

from the album This Is Who I Am
- Released: 12 March 2015
- Recorded: 2013
- Genre: Pop rock
- Length: 3:53 (album version)
- Label: Katina Music Inc
- Songwriters: Lena Katina, Maria Abraham, Jorg Kohring, Sven Martin
- Producer: Sven Martin

Lena Katina singles chronology
"Who I Am" (2014)	"An Invitation" (2015)	"Levántame" (2016)

"An Invitation" is the fourth single by Russian singer-songwriter Lena Katina's debut solo studio album This Is Who I Am. The song was written by Katina, Maria Abraham, Jorg Kohring and Sven Martin, who also produced it.

== Track listing ==
- Promo CD
1. "An Invitation"
2. "An Invitation" (Music Video)
- Remixes
1. "An Invitation" (Album Version) 3:53
2. "An Invitation" (Loaded Fist Remix) 4:26
3. "An Invitation" (Tim Resler Remix) 4:05
4. "An Invitation" (DJ Trojan & Alan Belini Remix) 3:36
5. "An Invitation" (Ilya Baronov Remix) 3:33
6. "An Invitation" (Zetandel Chill Mix) 4:43
7. "An Invitation" (The Tipsy Remix) 4:24
8. "An Invitation" (Alex Molchanov Remix) 4:02

== Music video ==
The music video for "An Invitation" was shot at location in the Church Palace in Rome, Italy during Katina's trip to an album presentation concert at Auditorium Parco della Musica in November 2014, while she was three months pregnant. Set in a luxurious, sexy atmosphere, the video shows Katina as a mysterious, almost angelical woman trying to convince a man to come to a pure world and escape a lustful life; he's seen surrounded by models.

The video premiered on March 12, 2015, at a press conference in the Church Palace with Katina and the whole video team explaining its concept.

The video won the 2015 Accolade Global Film Competition, "Award of Excellence" and the 2015 Apex Short Film + Music Video Festival award for "Best Soft-rock Music Video".

== Release history ==
Country	Date	Format	Label
World	18 November 2014	Digital download	Katina Music Inc.
World	12 March 2015	Promo CD	Maqueta Records
World	28 April 2015	Remixes	Katina Music Inc.
