= Mono (Lena Katina album) =

Моно

Studio album by Lena Katina
- Released: 26 July 2019
- Recorded: 2018–2019; Moscow, Russia
- Genre: Pop
- Length: 27:04
- Label: Katina Music Inc., Believe Digital
- Producer: Lena Katina (exec.)

Lena Katina chronology
This Is Who I Am (2014)	Моно (2019)	Акустика (2020)

Singles from Mono
- 1. "После нас" Released: 4 March 2018; 2. "Косы" Released: 30 July 2018; 3. "Макдоналдс" Released: 12 September 2018; 4. "Куришь" Released: 14 December 2018; 5. "Стартрек" Released: 12 April 2019; 6. "Моно" Released: 8 June 2019

Mono (Cyrillic: Моно; translation: "Mono") is the second studio album and the first Russian language album by singer-songwriter Lena Katina. It was released on 26 July 2019 by her own label, Katina Music Inc., and distributed by independent music distributor Believe Music. To promote the album launch, Katina embarked her first street concert that was held on Arbat, Moscow on the same day. Katina has collaborated with several talented musicians and authors from her homeland Russia and other Slavic countries such as Ukraine and the Commonwealth of Independent States.

A pop album, Mono incorporates a mixture elements of 1990s and modern pop, departing from the rock sounds of its predecessor, This Is Who I Am (2014). The album has topped the ITunes charts of several countries such as Estonia, where it peaked at number one. It also entered the ITunes charts in Mexico where it peaked at second place, Malaysia and Belarus where it both peaked at fourth place, and her homeland, Russia where it reached fifth place.

== Background and development ==
After the release of her debut album, Katina's vision to be a superstar in the Western market failed. She went back to Moscow and took a hiatus to focus on her family instead - especially to her son – Alexandr. As a mother, she only managed to have few collaborations with some local artists from her country but it was on 2018 when rumors spread that Katina have already began working on her second album.

In an interview with Teleprogramma, "Indeed, my first solo album in Russian is coming out. I am extremely happy for this, because when I lived in America, of course, everything was written in English! Now it's a work in Russian because I'm in Russia at the moment and I'll not leave in the near future! Although I didn't plan to leave before, to be honest, it just happened that way."

On 3 March 2018, the lead single for the album was released namely "После Нас" ("After Us"). It is a nostalgic dedication to the singer's memories of being in t.A.T.u. with former bandmate, Julia Volkova.

"Косы" ("Braids") is the second single for the album. Released on 30 July 2018, a music video was produced for the launch of the song and the said video was made simultaneously with her third single, "Макдоналдс" ("McDonald's"). The latter song was inspired from the 2006 film, Candy. Both music videos are released on the same month.

In the same year, the singer also released another single entitled, "Куришь" ("You Smoke").

On 12 April 2019, Katina released "Стартрек" ("Star Trek") and "Моно" ("Mono") on June 9. 20 days after the release of her last single for the album, Katina officially announced to the public (via Instagram) that her second album would be also named as Mono.

When the singer was asked regarding the meaning behind the album name, "I am now mono, that is because I am alone; independent as a solo artist." - implying that she really is no longer the half of t.A.T.u.

== Release and promotion ==
Mono's physical album was announced on Katina's IG's story on 18 October 2019. The CDs are limited though - a total of only 300 copies and each discs are enumerated. It was only sold in Katina's concerts that started in Chile and Brazil tour in November 2019. But before Katina and her team released the CD format of the said album, a mono-cassette tape format was announced on 31 July 2019.

== Critical reception ==
Mono received favourable reviews from critics, earning a score of 7 out 10. According to Intermedia, "It seemed to me that it was Katina who tried to emphasize her individuality in each songs of the album but some artistry style of t.A.T.u. can be heard in music with a slight difference, of course. In particular, Lena's teenage voice has almost completely disappeared from the vocals – hence – what we can hear now is the beautiful voice of an adult woman. Her vocals can be hardly recognized during the course of listening, for some reason, the names of Alisa Mon and Svetlana Vladimirskaya came to my head."

A less stellar review was published by Onet Muzyka, "The album Mono is simply a collection of songs that Lena Katina shared on YouTube over the last two years. Someone came up with the idea to collect them all and spend them under one banner. It is a pity that it is really difficult to determine in which direction the singer would like to go further. Everything has been already there and in fact we only get two new songs."

In an interview with Teleprogramma, the singer defended, "Mono is not just a collection of tracks - it is a life philosophy that is united by one red thread."

== Track listing ==
Моно – Standard edition
No.	Title	Writer(s)	Producer(s)	Length
1.	"Моно" (Mono)	Alexander Khoroshkovaty	Khoroshkovaty; Anton Paramonov	3:15
2.	"Ближе" (Closer)	Khoroshkovaty	Khoroshkovaty; Paramonov	3:22
3.	"Косы" (Braids)	Ana Baston	Oleg Chechik; UnorthodoxX	2:54
4.	"Куришь" (You Smoke)	Baston	Sergey Kuptsov; Red Square	3:40
5.	"Стартрек" (Startrek)	Baston	Chechik; Red Square	4:03
6.	"Мы Танцуем" (We Dance)	Max Beatston; Rostik Khalikov; Euphoria	Vyacheslav Fedyaev; Paramonov	3:15
7.	"Макдоналдс" (McDonald's)	Baston	Chechik; UnorthodoxX	3:18
8.	"После нас" (After Us)	Evgeny Bednenko; Oleg Drofa	Chechik; Ivan Martin	3:17
Total length:				27:04

Titles and credits were adapted from Spotify and VK.

== Release history ==
Country	Date	Version	Format	Label
Worldwide	26 July 2019	Standard	Digital download, Streaming, CD Download, Cassette	Katina Music Inc.
