= Lift Me Up (Lena Katina song) =

Single by Lena Katina

from the album This Is Who I Am
- Released: 24 September 2013
- Recorded: 2011
- Genre: Pop; Electropop
- Length: 3:22 (single and album version); 3:23 (spanish version); 31:39 (remix EP)
- Label: Katina Music, Inc.
- Songwriters: Katina, Jasmine Ash, Jacques Brautbar
- Producer: Brautbar

Lena Katina singles chronology
"Never Forget" (2011)	"Lift Me Up" (2013)	"Who I Am" (2014)

Music video
- "Lift Me Up" on YouTube

Lift Me Up is the second single by Russian singer-songwriter Lena Katina's from her debut solo studio album This Is Who I Am. The song was written by Lena, Jasmine Ash and Jacques Brautbar, who also produced it. On 1 July 2016, a Spanish version for the song called "Levántame" was also produced for the Spanish translated Katina's debut album. A remixes EP was also released and the songs peaked at 31 on Billboard Dance Hot Club Songs.

== Track listing ==
- Digital Download
1. "Lift Me Up" - 3:22
- Levantame (Spanish Version)
1. "Levantame" - 3:22
- Lift Me Up - The Remixes
1. "Lift Me Up" (Dave Audé Club Remix) - 5:52
2. "Lift Me Up" (Dave Audé Radio Remix) - 3:44
3. "Lift Me Up" (Nacho Chapado & Ivan Gomez Club Remix) - 5:26
4. "Lift Me Up" (Nacho Chapado & Ivan Gomez Radio Remix) - 3:21
5. "Lift Me Up" (Dirty Valente & Kevin D Remix) - 4:17
6. "Lift Me Up" (Maxon (De) Remix) - 6:18
7. "Lift Me Up" (Mykel Mars Remix) - 6:01
8. "Levantame" (Dave Audé Club Remix) - 5:52
9. "Levantame" (Dave Audé Radio Remix) - 3:41
10. "Levantame" (Maxon (De) Remix) - 6:18

== Music video ==
Lift Me Up is weighted with the feel good factor, and pays tribute to Lena's legion of hardcore fans that have supported her journey of re-invention. Lena is seen in the video clip, pinning up snapshots of her fans with their own ‘Lift Me Up’ slogans of support.

== Charts ==
Chart (2014)	Peak position
US Dance Club Songs (Billboard)	31
