= Never Forget (Lena Katina song) =

Single by Lena Katina

from the album This Is Who I Am
- B-side: "Stay"
- Released: 4 August 2011
- Recorded: 2011
- Genre: Pop rock; Alternative rock; post-grunge
- Length: 3:22 (single version); 3:34 (album version); 31:39 (remix EP)
- Label: Such Much Production
- Songwriters: Katina, Erik Lidbom, Hayden Bell, Sarah Lundbank
- Producers: Sven Martin, Lidbom

Lena Katina singles chronology
"Never Forget" (2011)	"Lift Me Up" (2013)

Alternative covers
- Dave Audé Remix EP cover

Music video
- "Never Forget" on YouTube

"Never Forget" is the lead single from Russian singer-songwriter Lena Katina's debut solo studio album This Is Who I Am. The song was produced by Sven Martin and Erik Lidbom. It is a pop rock track, driven by electric guitars and keyboard. "Never Forget" had positive feedback, claiming number one in MTV Russia.

A remixes EP was released on March 12, 2012, by Dave Audé, on his label Audacious Records, seven months after the single release. It includes remixes from Audé, Loud Manners, Sharooz and Jeremy Word and has charted on US Hot Dance Club Play, and topped the chart for one week. A live acoustic version of the song can be found on the RAWsession EP, released in March on iTunes.

== Track listing ==
- Digital Download
1. "Never Forget" - 3:22
2. "Stay" - 3:26
- Dave Aude featuring Lena Katina of t.A.T.u. - Remix EP
1. "Never Forget" (Dave Audé Club Mix) - 6:20
2. "Never Forget" (Dave Audé Radio Mix) - 3:45
3. "Never Forget" (Loud Manners Remix) - 6:14
4. "Never Forget" (Loud Manners Radio Mix) - 4:01
5. "Never Forget" (Sharooz Remix) - 5:01
6. "Never Forget" (Jeremy Word Remix) - 5:16
- The Remixes
1. "Never Forget" (Raindropz! Edit) - 2:55
2. "Never Forget" (ClubSukkerz & Danstyle Edit) - 3:02
3. "Never Forget" (Marq Aurel & Beatbreaker Edit) - 3:02
4. "Never Forget" (Marq Aurel & Beatbreaker Dub Edit) - 3:04
5. "Never Forget" (Ni Ego Remix Edit) - 3:33
6. "Never Forget" (Raindropz! Remix) - 4:30
7. "Never Forget" (Clubsukkerz & Danstyle Remix) - 4:25
8. "Never Forget" (Marq Aurel & Beatbreaker Remix) - 4:04
9. "Never Forget" (Marq Aurel & Beatbreaker Dub Remix) - 4:03
10. "Never Forget" (DJ V Remix) - 6:20
11. "Never Forget" (Chris Peeters & Niki Sato Remix) - 5:17
12. "Never Forget" (A Copycat Remix) - 3:51
13. "Never Forget" (Mark Boom Remix) - 4:37

Notes:

- The CD single is a limited edition only available from the Lena Katina's official store.

== Music video ==
The music video for Never Forget was released in early August 2011. The video starts with Katina waking up in a bright lit room, she then walks into a morgue and sees ex-t.A.T.u. bandmate Julia Volkova and herself dead. The two scenes interpolate. She walks down a hall where eight men are carrying two separate coffins. She follows them to a funeral where she tips a framed photograph of herself over, kisses a photo of Yulia and exits the building. She walks through their graveyard, taking a bouquet of roses out when she leaves. She gets into a car and scatters the flowers.

== Charts ==
Chart (2012)	Peak position
US Dance Club Songs (Billboard); Dave Audé Remix Version	1

== Release history ==
Country	Date	Format	Label
World	August 4, 2011	Digital download	Such Much Production
World	March 11, 2012	Dave Audé Remix EP	Audacious Records
World	May 21, 2012	Dave Audé Remix EP (physical CD)	Audacious Records
World	August 31, 2012	The Remixes	Redlight-Media & Beatbox Recordz

== See also ==
- List of number-one dance singles of 2012 (U.S.)
