= Oh Darling =

Oh Darling may refer to:

== Music ==
- Oh Darling (band)

=== Songs ===
- "Oh Darlin'", by the O'Kanes
- "Oh Darling" (song), by Alisa Mizuki
- "Oh! Darling", by the Beatles
- Oh Darling, a song from Supertramp's Breakfast in America album
