= Zombie Holidays 3D =

2013 Russian horror-comedy film

- Theatrical release poster
- Russian: Zомби каникулы 3D
- Directed by: Kirill Kemnitz
- Written by: Kirill Kemnitz; Sergey Torchilin
- Produced by: Mikhail Kupfer; Andrey Kupfer; Sergey Torchilin
- Starring: Julia Volkova
- Cinematography: Viktor Makarov
- Music by: Dmitry Noskov
- Production company: New Wave Production
- Distributed by: Top Film Distribution
- Release date: 6 April 2013
- Running time: 95 minutes
- Country: Russia
- Language: Russian
- Box office: $750.000

Zombie Holidays 3D (Russian: Zомби каникулы 3D, romanized: Zombi kanikuly 3D) is a 2013 Russian zombie comedy film directed by Kirill Chemnitz. It premiered in Russia on 15 August 2013.

== Plot ==
A strange capsule falls to Earth and lands on the car of a drunken man. Professor Dudikov brings the capsule to his research institute and conducts experiments on it. The capsule contains an alien virus which attacks other cells with great speed, transforming them into itself. Meanwhile, a young man named Ivan goes to a beach party with his best friend Sasha, hoping to meet his girlfriend Natasha there. Later, Professor Dudikov is fired from his job, and during a quarrel with a security guard, the alien capsule is accidentally broken. Soon, zombies start to emerge from the research facility. Another building security guard, Peter, manages to escape. The zombies start their rampage by breaking into a nearby Japanese martial arts studio and turning everyone inside into living dead. Ivan, Sasha, and Natasha are having fun at the party with their friends Kostya and Vadim, and do not notice the approaching zombies. A full-scale attack ensues. Ivan, Sasha, Natasha, and Kostya find themselves on the roof of a minibus. They manage to escape to a hotel, together with Peter. Once inside, they find weapons that have been left behind. After leaving the hotel, the group takes refuge on the roof of a high-rise building. A few days later, they are forced to come down, and they find Professor Dudikov, who has himself been bitten by a zombie. The professor dies after telling the group that he has developed a vaccine against the virus. Natasha is bitten, and they go to Dudikov's car, where four syringes with the antiviral agent are stored. Peter is bitten and as he begins to transform, shoots himself in the head. Only Ivan, Sasha, Natasha, and Kostya survive. The four desperately fight a horde of zombies using an improvised flamethrower, dynamite, and a few firearms. The zombies are too numerous, however. Suddenly, a combat helicopter arrives and destroys all the zombies. The friends celebrate their victory, but all of a sudden, many similar capsules fall to the ground, one of which kills Kostya. As it turns out, the first one was only a test by the aliens, and now the zombie apocalypse begins in earnest, covering the entire planet. Years pass. Having become experienced fighters, Ivan, Sasha, and Natasha get to Moscow, where there are only zombies left. In the midst of a battle, they run out of ammo and are surrounded by a crowd of zombies. Suddenly, they are rescued by Vladimir Putin and George W. Bush, who arrive in a jeep and save the day.

== Cast ==
- Julia Volkova as Natasha
- Mikhail Efremov as Professor Dudikov
- Anton Zinoviev as Ivan
- Alexander Efremov as Kostya

== Reception ==
The film received negative reviews from film critics. It received an average rating of 43 out of 100 from Russian publications.
