= Didn't Wanna Do It =

2012 single by Julia Volkova

Single by Julia Volkova
- Released: 21 August 2012
- Recorded: 2012 (Los Angeles, California) (Stockholm, Sweden) (Moscow, Russia)
- Genre: Dance
- Length: 3:46
- Label: JV Production
- Songwriter(s): Saeed Molavi, Nadir Benkahla, Taj Jackson
- Producer(s): The Euroz

Julia Volkova singles chronology
"All Because of You" (2011)	"Didn't Wanna Do It" (2012)	""Back To Her Future" (2012)

"Didn't Wanna Do It" (Russian: Давай Закрутим Землю; Davai Zakrutim Zemlyu Translation: Let’s Make The Earth Turn) is a song by the Russian recording artist and songwriter Julia Volkova from her studio album. "Didn't Wanna Do It" was written by Julia Volkova, Saeed Molavi, Nadir Benkahla and the Grammy Award-nominated producer Taj Jackson, with production by Saeed Molavi & Nadir Benkahla (known as The Euroz). The song was chosen as the second single, and was released digitally on August 21, 2012. Musically, the song is a dance-pop song, which features elements of house and Europop. The song's homoerotic lyrics are a first-person account of the singer's sexual encounter with another woman and the ambivalent feelings the experience evoked. Bisexuality has been a frequent theme of Volkova's work, such as in her first single as t.A.T.u., "All The Things She Said" (2002) as well as "Loves Me Not". The single's accompanying artwork caused criticism and controversy among fans.

"Didn't Wanna Do It" received mixed to positive reviews from critics, as most enjoyed the sexual-oriented style of the song and the production, though some felt the composition lacked originality. The accompanying music video, released on Volkova's YouTube channel, features a female as she witnesses her boyfriend cheating on her. Volkova then helps her become more sexual, and takes her to a "Free Love Club," where both women party. The video received positive reviews from critics.

== Background ==
In August 2011, Volkova had signed to the Russian label Gala Records, a subsidiary of EMI Records. While her studio album was in production, she released her first solo single entitled "Woman All The Way Down", which was also recorded in Stockholm, Sweden. Not long after, the Russian version and the music video were released on her website. The single turned out to be a buzz single. In March 2012, it was reported by the press that Volkova would be one of the 25 artists in the Russian final selection who would compete to represent Russia at the Eurovision Song Contest 2012 in Baku, Azerbaijan. The Russian broadcaster RTR later confirmed her participation among the other 25. She entered the competition with the Eurovision 2008 winner Dima Bilan as a duo with the song "Back to Her Future". They finished in second place with 29.25 points. The winning entry, "Party for Everybody" by the Russian ethno-pop band Buranovskiye Babushki, was 38.51 points ahead of them. She then recorded a studio version, which was released on iTunes not long after.

== Composition ==
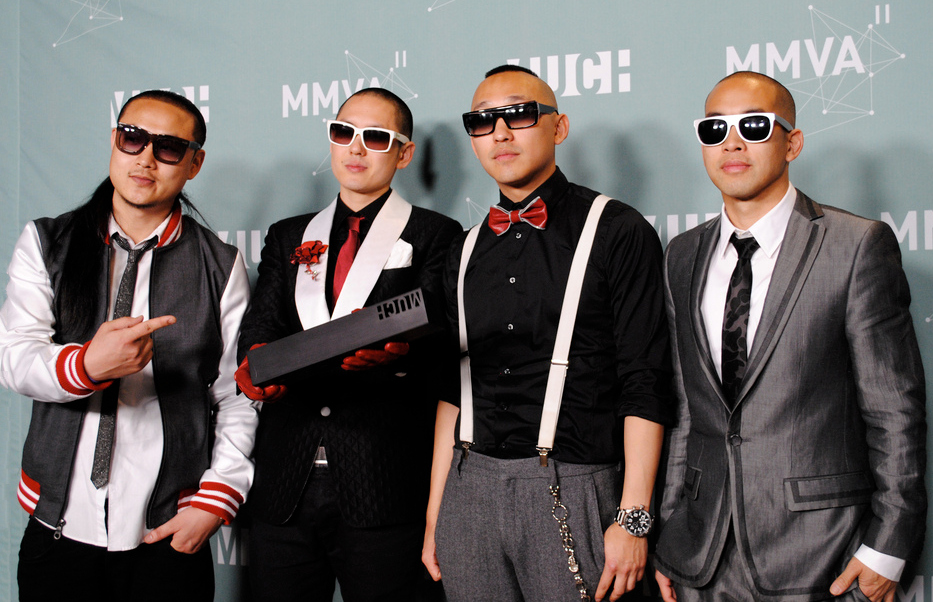
"Didn't Wanna Do It" was compared to Far East Movement, musically.

"Didn't Wanna Do It" is a dance-oriented song, with elements of Europop and house music. According to Volkova on her website, "The song is a departure from t.A.T.u.'s signature sound that catapulted Julia to worldwide fame and critical acclaim but the new musical direction is undeniably her own." MuuMuse compared the lyrics to LMFAO by saying "The feisty brunette's since ditched t.A.T.u.'s brooding act and decided to toss her head back, throw back a few shots and enter into LMFAO-like territory: “I didn't wanna do it…but I did”. MuuMuse also compared the composition to Far East Movement saying "Julia laments across the bubbly, unhinged Euro-dance anthem, trading dooming synthesizers for Far East Movement-friendly thumps." The Prophet Blog noticed the production off auto-tune in the song and said it resembled 2NE1's "I Am the Best" (2012). It also commented on the lyrics, saying it "seduces another woman, then regrets it and claims she never wanted to do it in the first place."

For the release off the Russian version, "Davai Zakrutim Zemlyu", the song's pitch is different to the original version so it can suit Volkova's vocals.

== Release and artwork ==
"Didn't Wanna Do It" was her first worldwide single. It was expected to be released in July 2012, but was delayed until 21 August 2012.

On 14 July 2012, Volkova, along with t.A.T.u.'s fansite AllMyLove.org, posted the picture of the single cover artwork on Facebook. The artwork, a drawing inspired by graphic novels, caused controversy among fans. It is said to be inspired by the Australian artwork of t.A.T.u.'s single "All the Things She Said", but many fans argued that it did not share any similarities.

== Critical reception ==
"Didn't Wanna Do It" received generally positive reviews from mainstream and independent music critics. According to Volkova herself, "With the collision of its stomping bass, raw, grinding synths and the infectious, unforgettable chorus this song has all the makings of a summer hit." MuuMuse gave it a positive review, describing it as catchy saying "It’s a ridiculously raunchy, filthy fun club cut, and that chorus ain’t leaving my brain anytime soon." The Prophet Blog gave it a mixed review, calling Volkova in the song "naive and innocent", while saying "With beauty created by the surgeon’s knife, buckets of autotune, and porno-pop music videos, Yulia is basically the Russian Nicki Minaj." However, he later went on to give the song and video a positive review stating that "Julia Volkova’s “Didn’t Wanna Do It” is flawless."

== Music video ==
The music video was premiered on MuuMuse on 31 July 2012. It was directed by Hindrek Maasik and shot in Cuba. Volkova said of the shooting, "I didn't expect that it would be so hot. We were constantly trying to hide in the shadows. The sun was just unbearable. I was sweating like a mouse the whole time and my make-up was leaking. It was such a pain to film."

The song starts with a woman catching her boyfriend cheating on her with her own mother. After crying outside in the streets, she sees a flyer saying "LOVE PROBLEMS? CALL (S)EXPERTS: 69", which she dials. It turns out to be Volkova, who helps her become more sexual, teaching her some erotic dance moves and taking her to her house where she tries out some clothes. The pair then drive to a "Free Love Party", where the partygoers drink, dance, and have sex. An uncensored version was released on her website, with full frontal nudity and onscreen sex, though the censored version has only brief full-frontal nudity.

== Live performances ==
On 27 August 2012, Volkova performed the Russian version of the song ("Давай закрутим Землю") at Diskoteka Muz TV, in Riga, Latvia. Following the performance, she sang the Russian version of the song "Back To Her Future ("Любовь-сука"), with the Russian singer Dima Bilan. On 8 September 2012, Volkova performed at Ello Festival in Moscow, performing all the songs in Russian, including "Я сошла с ума" ("All The Things She Said"), "Сдвину мир" ("All Because of You") and "Давай закрутим Землю" ("Didn't Wanna Do It").

== Track listing ==
- Didn't Wanna Do It (Explicit)
1. "Didn't Wanna Do It" (Explicit) - 3:44
2. "Давай закрутим Землю" (Explicit) - 3:45
- Didn't Wanna Do It
1. "Didn't Wanna Do It" (Clean) - 3:44

== Release history ==
Country	Date	Format	Label
World	21 August 2012	Digital download	JV Production
Russia	21 August 2012	Airplay	JV Production
Poland	September 7, 2012	Airplay	JV Production
