= Lena Katina =

Russian singer (born 1984)

- Лена Катина
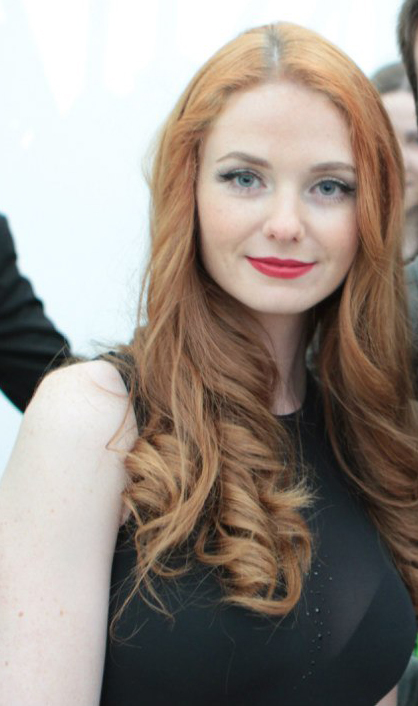
- Katina in 2013
- Born: Elena Sergeyevna Katina; 4 October 1984 (age 42); Moscow, Soviet Union
- Occupations: Singer; songwriter; actress
- Years active: 1994–present
- Father: Sergey Katin
- Musical career
- Genres: Pop; rock; electronica
- Instruments: Vocals; piano
- Labels: Katina Music Inc.; Maqueta Records; T.A. Music; Such Much Productions
- Member of: t.A.T.u.
- Formerly of: Avenue; Neposedy
- Website: lenakatina.com

Elena Sergeyevna Katina (Russian: Елена Сергеевна Катина; born 4 October 1984), better known as Lena Katina, is a Russian singer who gained fame as one half of the pop/electronica duo t.A.T.u. She started her career at the age of eight, joining the Russian children's act Avenue, soon after that joining Neposedy. In 1999, producer Ivan Shapovalov chose Katina and Julia Volkova for his project t.A.T.u. The duo would later become Russia's most successful pop music act. The group produced several hits, including "All the Things She Said", "Not Gonna Get Us", and "All About Us". Their first single, "All the Things She Said", peaked at No. 1 in nineteen countries, including the UK, Russia, and Australia.

In 2009 Katina began a solo career, which caused t.A.T.u. to go on hiatus. In 2011 the duo officially split, with Volkova also pursuing a solo path. That year, Katina released her first mainstream single, "Never Forget", which reached No. 1 on the MTV Russia Top 10 and also won the MTV Russia – 2011 Video of the Year. The track also reached No. 1 on Billboard magazine's Hot Dance Club Play and rose to first place in Greece.

In 2014 Katina released her debut album, This Is Who I Am, which was reissued in Spanish under the name Esta Soy Yo two years later. In 2019, she released her second album, Mono.

== Early years ==
Elena Sergeyevna Katina was born on 4 October 1984 in Moscow, then the capital of the Soviet Union. Her father, Sergey Katin, is a musician who was a member of the pop band Duna. Starting at just four years old, on her father's initiative, Katina began to attend various sport and music clubs. At the age of seven, Katina began regular school and within a year, she entered music school for piano classes. When she was ten, she joined the children's group Avenue as a soloist, singing with the ensemble for the next three years. When she was thirteen, she became a member of the vocal and instrumental group Neposedy, where she met Julia Volkova, and the two became friends. At the age of fifteen, she was successfully cast for a music project, to which Volkova was invited after some time, and which has become the pop duo t.A.T.u..

== Music career ==
=== 1999–2011: t.A.T.u. ===
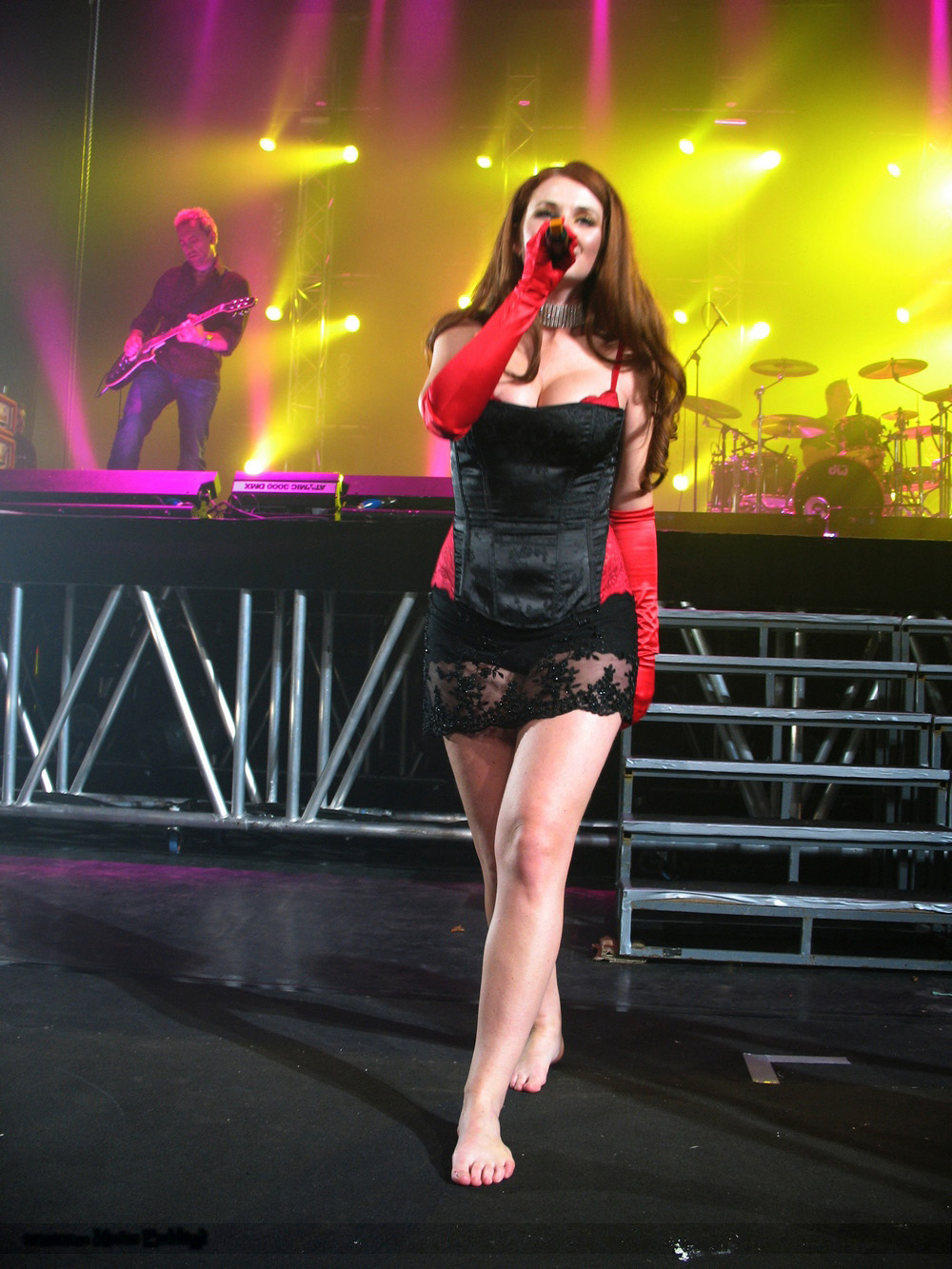
Lena Katina performing with t.A.T.u. in Moscow, 2008

Together with Julia Volkova, Katina made up the duo t.A.T.u., a group active since 1999. They achieved global fame with hits such as "All the Things She Said", "Not Gonna Get Us", and "All About Us", and took part in the 2003 Eurovision Song Contest, finishing third with "Ne Ver', Ne Boysia". In 2007, both girls appeared in the US–Russian drama film You and I, which starred Mischa Barton in the lead role and was based on the 2006 Aleksey Mitrofanov novel t.A.T.u. Come Back, itself inspired by the story of the pop duo.

t.A.T.u. went on hiatus in 2009, and the duo officially disbanded in March 2011. A statement was released on their website stating that t.A.T.u. will no longer be a "full-time" project and that Katina and Volkova were working on solo projects.

=== 2009–2016: Solo career: This Is Who I Am and Esta Soy Yo ===
During t.A.T.u.'s hiatus in 2009, Katina announced her solo project and started recording solo material. In 2010, she hosted a fan event at the Trail in Los Angeles on 29 May and gave her first solo performance the next day at the Troubador. She was the opening act of PrideFest in Milwaukee on 12 June 2010 and on the same day, she released a free download of a song from her upcoming album, titled "Lost in this Dance". She also contributed vocals to the song "Guardian Angel" by Canadian electronic metalcore band Abandon All Ships, which was featured on their 2010 debut album, Geeving.

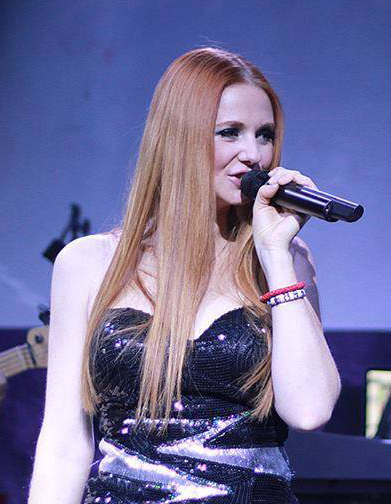
Lena Katina performing in Mexico in 2013

On 17 June 2011 Katina's single "Never Forget" premiered on the Mexican radio station FMTU 103–7 in Monterrey. The release, once available on iTunes, also included the song "Stay". In July, Katina and her band appeared on Rawsession, where they performed original acoustic versions of Owl City's "Deer in the Headlights", Alexandra Stan's "Mr. Saxobeat", and her own "Never Forget". The three tracks were later released as an EP titled RAWsession 07.14.11.

In September 2011 Katina released the song "Waiting" and featured on the track "Tic-Toc" by Mexican pop band Belanova. This was included on Belanova's fifth studio album, Sueño Electro II. On 9 December 2011, the single "Keep on Breathing" came out. The track was used to raise funds for children affected by the earthquake and tsunami in Japan.

In September 2012 Katina collaborated with Russian rapper T-Killah on the track "Shot". The Russian version of the song, titled "Ya Budu Ryadom", came out the following year. On 24 September 2013, Katina issued the single "Lift Me Up", which peaked at number 31 on the Billboard Dance Club Songs.

On 17 March 2014 Katina released her first live album, European Fan Weekend 2013 Live, which included her solo material as well as a number of t.A.T.u. tracks. In September, she announced via Facebook that her debut studio album, This Is Who I Am, would be released on 18 November 2014, preceded by the single "Who I Am" on 7 October. On 12 March 2015, the album's fourth single, "An Invitation", aired. In July 2016, a Spanish version of This Is Who I Am was released, under the title Esta Soy Yo.

=== 2017–2025: Mono, television work, and Maneken ===
In October 2017 Katina released her new English-language single "Silent Hills". In December, she published the song "Here I Go Again", a collaboration with Daddy Mercury. On 3 March 2018, she released the Russian-language ballad "после нас" ("After Us"), a nostalgic retrospective on her time with t.A.T.u. This was followed by three more Russian-language singles later that year: "Косы" ("Braids"), "Куришь" ("You Smoke"), and "Макдоналдс" ("McDonald's"). In 2019, Katina published the singles "Стартрек" ("Star Trek") in April and "Моно" ("Mono") in June. Later the same month, she announced the upcoming release of her first Russian-language opus, titled Моно. The eight-track album was released on 26 July. In November, another single, "Никогда" ("Never"), came out.

In 2020 Lena Katina joined ex-Neposedy member Sergey Lazarev as a judge on Russia-1's reality competition series All Together Now!/Ну-ка, все вместе!, where a contestant's singing ability is judged by a team of 100 musicians. Alongside Katina, the panel of judges included Valentina Pyatchenko and Yekaterina Shklyayeva, members of the ethno-pop group Buranovskiye Babushki. She also made an appearance on the Russian edition of The Masked Singer as Spider/Паук. She was eliminated from the show on 13 April, landing in sixth place.

Katina released a number of singles in 2020, including "Virus", "Убей меня нежно" ("Killing Me Softly"), "Crybaby", and an English version of "Никогда", titled "Nevermind", written by Martin Kierszenbaum. Her acoustic EP Акустика (Acoustics) was published in April. In June 2021, she released the single "Из темноты" and followed it with "Stay the Same" in December.

On 27 January 2023 she issued the single "Tакси" ("taxi"), from her upcoming Russian-language EP, Манекен ("mannequin"), which came out on 28 April. A second promotional single, "Белла чао" ("bella ciao"), premiered the same day as the album release.

After a maternity hiatus of over a year, Katina released the single "Маяк" on 6 December 2024, and she featured on the track "Новый год" by Russian singer Oksana Pochepa. A third promotional single from her 2023 EP, Манекен, titled "Шагать в никуда", was issued on 29 December 2024.

=== 2025–present: t.A.T.u. reunion ===
In 2025, Katina reunited with Julia Volkova as t.A.T.u., marking the duo's return to performing together following their previous appearances in 2022 and 2023. On 19 July 2025, the duo performed at the Mriya Resort in Yalta, Crimea.

They subsequently performed two concerts at the TAU venue in Moscow on 24 and 25 October 2025; a single date had originally been scheduled, with a second added in response to demand. A run of dates in Mexico followed later that year, and the duo also travelled to Japan for a Gosha Rubchinskiy collaboration, their first visit to the country in twelve years.

In 2026, t.A.T.u. continued performing together with appearances in Russia, Mexico and Brazil. The duo were announced among the headliners of VK Fest 2026 and performed at the festival in Saint Petersburg on 5 July and in Moscow on 19 July. Two planned concerts in Georgia did not take place: a show at the Tbilisi Sports Palace scheduled for 30 January 2026, which would have been the duo's first in the country, was called off, as was a 1 August 2026 performance at the Batumi tennis courts.

== Personal life ==
Katina married her boyfriend of three years, Slovenian musician Sasha Kuzmanović, in 2013. She announced in November 2014 that she was three-and-a-half months pregnant with her first child during a concert in Rome and gave birth to a son on 22 May 2015. In 2019, Katina and Kuzmanović divorced. In June 2021, Katina revealed that she was in a relationship with Russian businessman Dmitry Spiridonov, the CEO of CloudPayments. The couple became engaged on 1 May 2022 and were married on 16 June at the MFC of Moscow. In November of the same year, Katina announced that she was pregnant with her second child and Spiridonov's first. She gave birth to a son on 11 July 2023.

=== Support for the LGBT community ===
In September 2012 Katina and her band performed at the international festival Queerfest in Saint Petersburg. She stated, "We all are very different people and we should celebrate our differences. We should not be silent when we see this intolerant aggression towards LGBT-community". The organisers noted that "Lena's participation in Queerfest is a truly historic moment: for the first time such a high-profile Russian artist supports the festival".

In September 2014 Katina's former t.A.T.u. bandmate, Julia Volkova, appeared as a contestant on a Ukrainian game show called Lie Detector and made comments considered to be highly homophobic, especially towards gay men. Katina reacted, saying:

Hey, all! I am seeing some comments lately regarding my position about LGBT and my religion. I can say one thing: God is teaching us to live in love, to be tolerant and not to judge other people! And I do so! Love is love and it is a wonderful feeling! I think everybody should be free to love who they love and be with whom they want to spend their life with! Xoxo

=== Feud with Julia Volkova ===
In 2010 Julia Volkova expressed her opinion on Katina's solo career, saying, "[Lena] has the right to [sing t.A.T.u. songs], but it's so stupid, absolutely stupid. If you do a solo career, it means that you do your own work. Her stuff, that she makes, I think, is silly and very soon her career will wither away and disappear". Katina responded to this interview via her YouTube page, saying, "I saw Julia's interview. Of course I got upset. But I want to tell everybody that I have a completely opposite attitude towards the whole situation, Julia's project included. I believe she's a very talented person and I sincerely hope that she'll be successful in all the things she plans". The group officially disbanded in 2011.

While the duo reunited briefly in 2012–2014, with a performance at The Voice of Romania while promoting the re-released edition of 200 km/h in the Wrong Lane, a concert in Kyiv, and a pre-opening performance at the 2014 Winter Olympics in Sochi, on 17 February 2014, Katina posted a video message on her official YouTube channel, stating that she would no longer be working with Volkova.

On 22 May 2014 both singers introduced their appearance in Cornetto Russia's A Sight of Cupid project while at the Cannes Film Festival. Both separately recorded a song and a video, titled "Love in Every Moment".

In 2016 Katina and Volkova appeared together at the 25th anniversary celebration of the children's musical group Neposedy, of which both were members before t.A.T.u. was formed. Katina performed her song "All Around the World", and together with Volkova, sang "Нас не догонят" ("Not Gonna Get Us").

In September 2022 Katina and Volkova performed together under the name t.A.T.u. at the Dinamo Stadium in Minsk, Belarus, as part of the Ovion Show event. This was followed by another performance at a sporting event at the Gazprom Stadium in Saint Petersburg in May 2023.

== Acting career ==
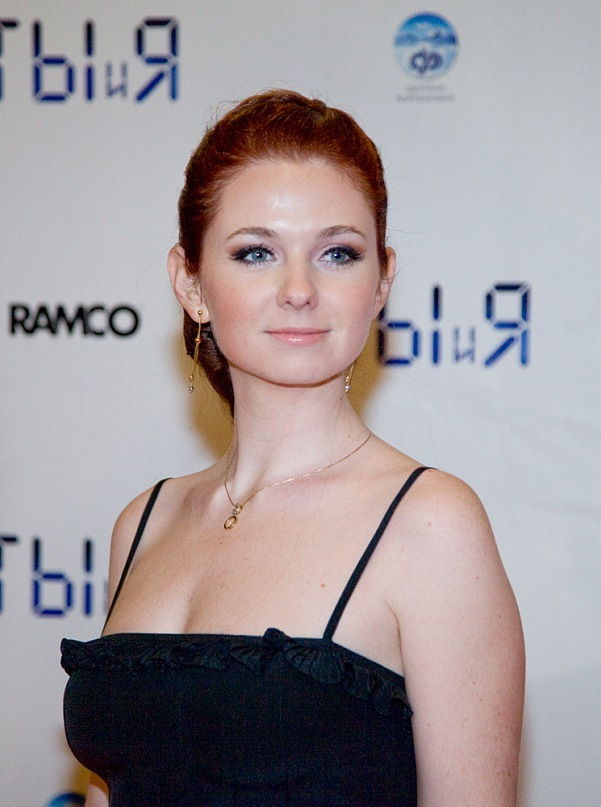
Lena Katina at the You and I movie premiere in 2011

Katina made her film debut alongside Julia Volkova and Mischa Barton in the 2008 film You and I, the story of two teenage girls who meet and fall in love at a Moscow t.A.T.u. concert. The film is based on the novel t.A.T.u. Come Back, itself loosely based on the duo's career and lives.

Katina voiced the fairy Zarina in the Russian dub of the 2014 Disney film The Pirate Fairy. Also in 2014, she appeared in the short film Together Apart, playing one of the cupids. Julia Volkova had a similar role in the production.

== Discography ==
=== Studio albums ===
Title	Details
This Is Who I Am	Released: 18 November 2014; Label: Katina Music Inc.; Format: Digital download, CD
Esta Soy Yo	Released: 1 July 2016; Label: Katina Music Inc., Maqueta Records; Format: Digital download, CD
Mono	Released: 26 July 2019; Label: Katina Music Inc.; Format: Digital download, Limited CD-R

=== EPs ===
Title	Details
RAWsession – 07.14.11	Released: 2011; Format: Digital download
Never Forget (Remixes) (featuring THEE PAUS3)	Released: 2012; Format: Digital download
Акустика	Released: 2020; Format: Digital download
Манекен	Released: 28 April 2023; Label: Katina Music Inc.; Format: Digital download

=== Live albums ===
Title	Details
European Fan Weekend 2013 Live	Released: 17 March 2014; Label: Katina Music Inc.; Format: Digital download, CD

=== Singles ===
==== As lead artist ====
Title	Year	Peak chart positions	Album
Title	Year	US Club	Album
"Never Forget"	2011	1	This Is Who I Am
"Lift Me Up"	2013	31	This Is Who I Am
"Who I Am"	2014	—	This Is Who I Am
"An Invitation"	2015	—	This Is Who I Am
"Levántame"	2016	—	Esta Soy Yo
"Silent Hills" (with Jus Grata)	2017	—	Non-album single
"После нас"	2018	—	Mono
"Косы"	2018	—	Mono
"Макдоналдс"	2018	—	Mono
"Куришь"	2018	—	Mono
"Стартрек"	2019	—	Mono
"Моно"	2019	—	Mono
"Никогда"	2019	—	Non-album singles
"Вирус"	2020	—	Non-album singles
"Убей меня нежно"	2020	—	Non-album singles
"Cry Baby"	2020	—	Non-album singles
"Nevermind"	2020	—	Non-album singles
"Из темноты"	2021	—	Non-album singles
"Stay the Same"	2021	—	Non-album singles
"Tакси"	2023	—	Mанекен
"Белла чао"	2023	—	Mанекен
"Никогда" (with ShonZi)	2024	—	Non-album singles
"Маяк"	2024	—	Non-album singles
"Шагать в никуда"	2024	—	Mанекен
"Беги или останься"	2025	—	Non-album single
"Океанами" (with DJ DimixeR)	2025	—	Non-album single
"Стали целым"	2026	—	Non-album single
"Полюбить себя"	2026	—	Non-album single
"Love Yourself"	2026	—	Non-album single
"Поцелуи на поражение" (with Fargo)	2026	—	Non-album single
"—" denotes a single that did not chart or was not released.

==== As featured artist ====
Title	Year	Peak chart positions			Album
Title	Year	US Hot Latin Songs	US Latin Pop Airplay	SPA	Album
"Tic-Toc" (with Belanova)	2011	32	2	12	Sueño Electro II
"Here I Go Again" (with Daddy Mercury)	2017	—	—	—	Non-album single

==== Promotional singles ====
Title	Year	Album
"Lost in This Dance" (Pridefest Mix)	2010	Non-album single
"Keep on Breathing"	2011	Non-album single
"Just a Day"	2013	This Is Who I Am
"World (Demo)"	2013	Non-album single
"No Voy Olvidarte" (MZ Remix)	2013	Non-album single
"Fed Up"	2014	This Is Who I Am

=== Other appearances ===
Title	Year	Other artist(s)	Album	Note
"Guardian Angel"	2010	Abandon All Ships	Geeving	
"Melody"	2012	Clark Owen	Melody – single	
"Shot"/ "Я буду рядом" ("Ya budu ryadom")	2013	T-killah	Boom	
"Paradise"	2013	Sergio Galoyan	Paradise – EP	
"It's Christmas Time"	2013	Orbit Monkey	It's Christmas Time – EP	
"Что не хватает" ("Chto ne khvatayet")	2013	7B	Fanat	
"Century"	2014	Re:boot (Kiro and Denis Kurus)	Century – Single	
"Любовь в каждом мгновении" ("Lyubov v kazhdom mgnovenii")	2014	Julia Volkova & Legalize feat. Mike Tompkins	Lubov v Kazhdom Mgnovenii – Single	
"Golden Leaves"	2015	Noemi Smorra	Trasparente – EP/ "This Is Who I Am"	
Новая любовь ("Novaya lyubov")	2015	Podnebeses	—N/a	
"Девочки-Лунатики (Live)" ("Devochki-lunatiki")	2015	Vintage	Live 1.0	
"Новый год" ("Noviy god")	2024	Oksana Pochepa & NLO	Баба Яга спасает Новый год – soundtrack	

=== As songwriter ===
Title	Year	Artist	Album	Note
"Lucifer"	2014	Anna Tsuchiya	Lucifer – EP	co-writer

=== Music videos ===
Title	Year	Director(s)
As lead artist
"Never Forget"	2011	James Cox
"Lift Me Up"	2013	David Lehre
"Who I Am"	2014	Jason Wisch
"An Invitation"	2015	Livia Alcalde & Francesco Sperandeo
"An Invitation (Loaded Fist Remix Video)"	2015	Livia Alcalde & Francesco Sperandeo
"Levántame"	2016	David Lehre
"После нас"	2018	Stas Skiba
"Макдоналдс"	2018	Olga Rudenko
"Косы"	2018	Olga Rudenko
"Cry baby"	2020	Alexey Glott & Rudenko Olga
"Такси"	2023	Konstantin Cherepkov (SEVER)
"Белла чао"	2023	Konstantin Cherepkov (SEVER)
"Шагать в никуда"	2024	Konstantin Cherepkov (SEVER)
"Полюбить себя"	2026	Kristina Korenzla
As featured artist
"Tic-Toc" (Belanova featuring Lena Katina)	2011	Daniel Robles
"Never Forget" (Dave Audé featuring Lena Katina)	2012	James Cox
"Melody" (Clark Owen featuring Lena Katina)	2012	Jason Wisch
"Shot" & "Я буду рядом" (T-killah featuring Lena Katina)	2013	Chopchop
"Любовь в каждом мгновении" (Julia Volkova, Lena Katina, Ligalize & Mike Tompkins)	2014	Elena Kiper
"Golden Leaves" (Noemi Smorra featuring Lena Katina)	2015	Livia Alcalde & Francesco Sperandeo

=== Video releases ===
Title	Year	Note
This Is Who I Am – Live in Rome	2015	DVD (Live video, photos, and mp3)

Preceded by Prime Minister with "Northern Girl"	Russia in the Eurovision Song Contest; 2003 (as part of t.A.T.u.)	Succeeded by Yulia Savicheva with "Believe Me"
