= Who I Am (Lena Katina song) =

Single by Lena Katina

from the album This Is Who I Am
- Released: 7 October 2014
- Recorded: 2011
- Genre: Europop; Synth-rock
- Length: 3:22 (single version); 3:18 (album version)
- Label: Katina Music, Inc.
- Songwriters: Katina, Erik Lewander, Iggy Strange Dahl
- Producers: Lewander, Sven Martin

Lena Katina singles chronology
"Lift Me Up" (2013)	"Who I Am" (2014)	"An Invitation" (2015)

Music video
- "Who I Am" on YouTube

Who I Am is the third single by Russian singer-songwriter Lena Katina's debut solo studio album This Is Who I Am. The song was written by Katina, Erik Lewander and Iggy Strange Dahl and it was also produced by Lewander and Sven Martin.

== Track listing ==
- Digital Download & Promo CD
1. "Who I Am" - 3:16
- Я - это я (Ya - Eto Ya) (Russian Version)
1. "Я - это я" - 3:16

== Music video ==
The music video was released 21 October 2014 and was directed by American director, Jason Wisch.

In the video, Lena is sharing her soul in a variety of glamorous outfits and almost nothing as well, staring straight into the camera and expressing a wide range of emotions throughout — all meant to be an artistic statement about Lena as a human being.

Lena talked about the video stating, "The video turned out a little different from what I had in mind originally but it is very different from what I’ve done so far. I can say it is experimental. I wanted to show that I can be sad, in tears, or happy, angry or totally calm as well as all made up or with a very pure look… just like any other human being. A lot of people don’t think of artists as regular people but we all have the same emotions, problems or simple happiness… That was one of my goals, to show that an artist is just like any other person. The only difference is that you might see me on TV because I’ve become an openly public person!

I am very curious as to what my fans will think of the video actually, but I know that they love the song. I love it too and I am very happy with it! I think it is a good statement to make: this is who I am. :)"

=== Release history ===
Country	Date	Format	Label
World	7 October 2014	digital download	Katina Music Inc.
World	9 December 2014	digital download(Russian Version)	Katina Music Inc.
