= Golden Leaves =

Single by Noemi Smorra, Lena Katina

from the album Trasparente (Noemi Smorra), This Is Who I Am (Lena Katina)
- Released: January 12, 2015
- Recorded: 2014
- Genre: Europop
- Length: 3:16
- Label: Maqueta Records
- Songwriters: Fernando Alba, Kathleen Hagen
- Producer: Alessandro Paolinelli

"Golden Leaves" is a song by Italian actress and singer Noemi Smorra featuring Lena Katina, a former member of the early 2000s music band, t.A.T.u. This Europop song was written by Fernando Alba and Kathleen Haghen. Smorra and Katina first premiered Golden Leaves during a gig at the Auditorium Parco della Musica of Rome in November, 2014 and single was released two months later.

== Music video ==
The concept video for the song was directed by Livia Alcalde and Francesco Sperandeo and shot in Rome: young Lena introduces young Noemi to the magic world in an old Circus, and then they meet years later as grown up fairies. Golden Leaves fantasy music video received enthusiastic reviews and won several international awards, being screened in TCL Chinese Theatre in Hollywood and in many other theaters in Europe and USA.

== Charts and accolades ==
Golden Leaves was charted for 39 weeks and peaked #4 on the TOP20 in Russian state TV Channel One Russia, and ranked #16 in year-end video chart of 2015.

- FilmQuest Festival (USA) - Nominations: Best Music Video, Best Costumes
- Best Shorts Awards (USA) - Winner Award of Excellence Special Mention: Music Video
- Global Music Awards (USA) - Bronze Medal Winner: Music Video
- HollyShorts Film Festival (USA) - Official selection: Music Video
- Thurrock International Film Festival (UK) - Official selection: Music Video
- Digitalmation Awards (USA) - Winner: Music Video
- Mizzica Film Festival (Italy) - Selezione Videoclip 2015
- Avanca Film Festival (Portugal) - Trailer in Motion 2015 official selection: Music Video
- Apex Short Film + Music Video Festival (USA) - Official selection: Music Video
- Hamilton Music and Film Festival (Canada) - Official selection: Music Video
- Visioni Corte Film Festival (Italy) - Finalista sez. Cortomusic
- The Monthly Film Festival (USA) - Nomination: Music Video Of The Month
- Utah Music Awards (USA) - Nomination: Music Video
- European Film Festival (Germany) - Winner: Best Music Video
- London Shows Film Festival (UK) - Winner: Best Music Video
