= Nacho Chapado =

Nacho Chapado also known as Jose Ignacio Chapado is a DJ and music producer born in Barcelona, Spain in 1970.

== Biography ==
After several years as DJ in radio, clubs in Spain, Italy, France, and working for record companies, Nacho Chapado began to produce his own works. His first work as producer took place in 1999 with the group Soldiers of Dance (with Micky Forteza), an album published by Clan Records. It contained remixes of songs that were very popular then. The album was also released in Mexico by Azteca records. After a break of several years, 2004 was the starting point of a new stage in Nacho Chapado’s career. In the first months of this year Nacho published Imagination's "Just an Illusion" remix, made in collaboration with Sergi Vila and Raul Orellana. May 2004: "Strings Xpression" First Maxi in collaboration with Sergi Vila. September 2004: Second Maxi in collaboration with Sergi Vila that included themes like "40 Seconds" and "The Guitar Groove Theme", a vinyl with three different remixes.

In 2006 Nacho Chapado released his first White Label NCH” including the remix of B-Movie's "Nowhere Girl". This same year Nacho had a great success with the first remix in Catalan language which was an absolute revolution in the electronic music world in Catalonia. His remix version of Gossos & Beth "No Es Nou remix" give way to a CD with 11 remixes under the name "Nacho Chapado - Remixes Global 06". October 2006: Track2Club records published Nacho's maxi-special with the themes "Hypnotic Melody" and "Forbidden Secret". This was a special maxi for DJs. In Christmas 2006 Nacho sees two new remixes published. Versions of Beth & Jofre Bardagi's "Aquellas Nits de Nadal" and "Mirar-nos Als Ulls" are included in the CD Altres Cançons de Nadal, a Catalan best seller. Since the end of 2006 Nacho Chapado themes can be legally downloaded through beatport the best electronic music’s sales website in the world and also through in Trackitdown, Juno Download, Dj Download, and many more. His first themes for sale are: "Coming Up" and "Mystic Wave".

In January 2007 Cool Sound Music records publishes "Let It Fill Your Soul" in two versions: "Put Your Hands Up For Barcelona Mix" and "Electro Handbag Mix". In April 2007 Nacho will see published his remix versions of themes by the Catalan group Lexu's. This remixes can now be heard in different radio music stations. In May publishes the cd Remixes Global 07 with 14 remixes of different Catalan artist. In June the label Cool sound music digital published the songs "Amazing & Gorgeous", "Don't show the tears" and the remix made by Juanjo Martin of Nacho Chapado song "Coming up 2007" The summer of 2008 was a big success because the song "Mystery Luv" composed with Stephen Massa and the voice of Lou Mullen was a big hit around the world. In 2009 Nacho Chapado made many remixes and composed with S. Massa "Names and numbers", "Be Somebody" and "Behind the eyes" with the vocals of Sue Mclaren, and "Love to survive" with the voice of Luca G.

From 2010 he is also at the centre of a new tribal & progressive house music label, Guareber Recordings, which will see not just his, but close associations works released, which looks like making waves in Spain & beyond, Nacho explaining that "...the Spanish house mafia is here & we will hit the dancefloor with our tribal & progressive beats..."

In 2011, among other musical works have done remixes of Yoko Ono - "Move On Fast 2011 " and Superchumbo - "The Revolution 2011"

In 2012, among other musical works have done remixes of Offer Nissim - "I'm In Love", Amuka - Appreciate Me 2012, Peter Rauhofer - The World Is Mine

In 2013, among other musical works have done remixes of Robbie Rivera, Asher Monroe, Yoko Ono, Cazzette, Avril Lavigne, Pet Shop Boys, Akon, Dave Aude...

In 2014 among other musical works have done remixes of : Cher, Robbie Rivera, Lena Katina, Taryn Manning, Sir Ivan...

In 2015 among other musical works have done remixes of : Paris Hilton, Cierra Sample, Olivia Newton-John, Andy Bell (singer), Dave Aude ...

In 2016 Antoine Clamaran, Jx Riders Ft Skylar Stecker

== Albums ==
2004 House Works Compilation (Orange) (House Works)
Trailer Disco Club (House Works)
2005 Annual Ibiza 2005 (Metropol records)
Los Cierres de Ibiza 2005 (Metropol records)
The Shanghai Trendy Compilation (Hinote Japan)
Cheers Nini Compilation (Hinote Japan)
2006
This is electro house(Cool Sound Music)
Rac 105 Compilation (Universal music)
2007
Flamenco House (Cool Sound Music)
Remixes Global 07 (Musica Global)
Radio Flaixbac Nomès exits!!! (Universal music)
2008
Actual dance hits 08 (Bit Music/House Works)
Paul James presents Pulse - Remixed Vol. 1
Paul James presents Pulse - Remixed Vol. 2
Dancefloor 08 (Bit Music / House Works)
Dance Collection (Bit Music / House Works)
Club hits 08 (Bit Music / House Works)
2009
Top 2009 (Bit Music / House Works)
House Classics Made in Spain (Bit Music / House Works)
Dance hits 2 X 1 (Bit Music / House Works)
Deejay use tracks - Vol. 4 (House Works)
100% Numeros 1 (Bit Music / Divucsa)
Deejay use tracks - Vol. 6 (House Works)
Circuit Festival Compilation 2009 (Blanco y Negro)
House Works compilation summer 2009 (Bit Music)
Actual dance hits 09
Deejay use tracks - Vol. 10 Noviembre (House Works)
2010
Flaix FM Winter 2010 (Blanco y Negro)
Circuit Festival 2010 (Blanco y Negro)
2011
The Future Sound Of Egypt Compilation (Volume 1)
Circuit Festival 2011 Edition Cd
2012
Matinee Summer Edition 2012
Circuit Festival 2012 Edition
