= Jasmine Ash =

American singer-songwriter

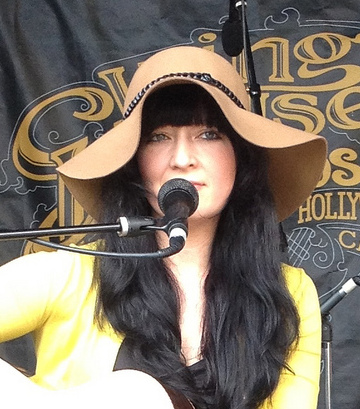
- Jasmine Ash in 2012

Background information
- Born: Jasmine Ananda Smith-Howard
- Origin: Portland, Oregon, United States
- Genres: Pop
- Occupation: Singer-songwriter
- Instrument: Vocals
- Years active: 2006–present
- Member of: Oh Darling, Gold & The Invisible Girl, Babybats
- Website: jasmineash.com

Jasmine Ananda Smith-Howard, better known as Jasmine Ash is an American singer-songwriter, from Portland, Oregon.

== Biography ==
In the fall of 2011, Ash's song "Starlight" premiered in Ferrero Rocher "Make Your Moments Golden" commercials in the UK, US and Ireland. The brand has continued to use the song in their 2012/13 and 2014/15 campaigns. The official video for "Starlight" was directed by Tripp and Jenna Watt and premiered on IFC.com in July 2012. The editors dubbed it, "Unadulterated and unabashed bubblegum pop that plays like a three-minute dose of summer."

Her debut full-length record, Beneath The Noise, was released on February 14, 2012. Tracks from the album, co-produced and co-written by Jacques Brautbar and Sam Farrar (Phantom Planet, Maroon 5), have and continue to achieve much sync success.

Her unreleased sophomore record "Come Here, Come Closer" along with over 150 other songs Ash has written over the years have continued to make an impact in the licensing world.

She is involved in several other projects; Oh Darling(Portland based indie/rock band), Gold & The Invisible Girl (Ethereal electronic duo) with producer Lee Groves (Goldfrapp, Gwen Stefani), and babybats, with producer Bill Lefler (Ingrid Michaelson, Cobra Starship).

Ash and Oh Darling have garnered press on Portland's NBC affiliate KGW, the Los Angeles Times Brand X, Buzzbands LA, The Oregonian, USA Today's Pop Candy, Metromix, and AOL Spinner

She opened for Marina and the Diamonds at The Troubadour in Los Angeles, California, during their The Family Jewels Tour.

== Noteworthy placements ==
=== Brands/commercials ===
Apple, Ferrero Rocher, JC Penney, Macy's., Nissan, Volkswagen, Airborne.

=== Television/movies ===
Pretty Little Liars, Jane by Design, The Good Wife, Drop Dead Diva, Ugly Betty., One Tree Hill, Zoey 101, Royal Pains, Girls Guide To Depravity, 90210, Rookie Blue, Hung, Covert Affairs, Faking It, Awkward, Prom, Beauty And The Briefcase

=== Promos ===
Gotham, The Bachelorette, Black Box, Grey's Anatomy, Starz.

== Collaborations ==
R5 (Hollywood), Lena Katina (t.A.T.u.), Jezzabel Doran (Sony Australia), Jaden Michaels (Pulse), Ed Sheeran (Atlantic), Macy Malloy (WCM), Erin McCarley (Universal), Emily Wright (Katy Perry, Miley Cyrus), Aben Eubanks (Kelly Clarkson), Ari Levine (Bruno Mars, Ceelo), Andrew Fromm (Marc Anthony, Backstreet Boys), Boots Ottestad (Robbie Williams, Macy Gray), Dan Layus (Augustana), Justin Gray (Mariah Carey, John Legend).

== Discography ==
=== Studio albums ===
- "Come Here, Come Closer" (Unreleased)
- Beneath the Noise (2012)

=== Singles ===
- "Pretty Little Thing Called Love – Single" (2012)
- "Someday's Gonna Come" (2013)
- "Wind Me Up" (2014)
