= N.A.T.o. (singer) =

Russian singer (born 1979)

n.A.T.o. Наталья Шевлякова
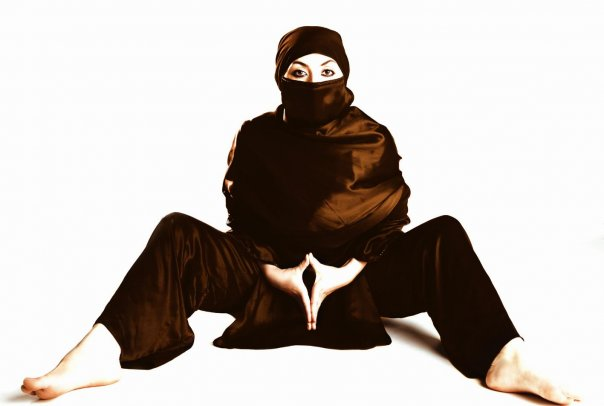
- A promotional image of n.A.T.o.

Background information
- Born: Natalya Shevlyakova; 3 October 1979 (age 47); Tbilisi, Georgian SSR, Soviet Union
- Genre: Pop
- Occupation: Singer
- Years active: 2004–2005
- Labels: ZTV International; Cheyenne Records
- Website: Official website (archived 25 June 2005)

Natalya Shevlyakova (Russian: Наталья Шевлякова; born 3 October 1979), known by her stage name n.A.T.o. (stylized as NATO, NAT'o, and Nato), is a Russian singer, best known for her controversial image and her single "Chor Javon".

After being discovered by Russian music producer Ivan Shapovalov, known for his work with pop duo t.A.T.u., n.A.T.o. recorded her eponymous debut studio album during the summer of 2004, incorporating elements of Arabic and European dance music and singing in Turkic languages. To promote the album, she was scheduled to give her debut concert in Moscow on 11 September 2004. However, the concert's timing and theme — simulating the experience of a plane hijacking by a religious fundamentalist terrorist — was condemned by media figures, politicians, and the general public. In early September, following a terrorist attack and two plane crashes in Russia, the concert was cancelled. The music video for the album's lead single, "Chor Javon", also drew controversy, and was removed from her website. n.A.T.o. eventually made her live debut in January 2005 at a Moscow nightclub.

At the time and retrospectively, the promotional campaign was subjected to extensive criticism. The concert was regarded as underwhelming by audiences, while academics and Muslim advocacy groups have voiced concern that n.A.T.o.'s image contributed to a stigma surrounding Islam. The controversy also failed to spur strong sales for her album.

== Career ==
=== Background and recording ===
Shevlyakova was reportedly discovered online by Ivan Shapovalov, the Russian music producer who had previously worked with the controversial pop duo t.A.T.u. Over the summer of 2004, Shevlyakova recorded her debut studio album, which consisted predominately of "love songs based on Arabic tunes" performed in Tajik, Georgian, and Persian. Her debut single, "Chor Javon", was a cover of a song written and originally performed by Tajik musician Muboraksho Mirzoshoyev. The song tells the story of four brothers who leave for a mountain hunt and are killed in an avalanche. A music journalist, quoted in a DNI.RU article, described the song as "a completely insane, hypnotic mixture from Dead Can Dance, a specially detuned piano, a waltz rhythm beaten off by electric drums, an unusual, very weighty voice of the singer and the screams of horsemen in the background". The song was featured on the 2004 Russian compilation album Поднебесная № 1 (Celestial Empire No. 1). Other songs on the album discuss the experiences of falling in love, "caring and fearing for the beloved", and lost love. Shevlyakova wrote all of her lyrics herself, while Shapovalov handled the production, leading to a sound described as "Turk-pop versions of t.A.T.u. hits", as well as being "filled with piercing sadness, heaped up ethno-electronics".

Shevlyakova's identity was a mystery when n.A.T.o. began getting attention, with her name not being publicly revealed and the artist refusing to grant interviews. As she performed in a hijab, her face was hidden, and audiences speculated about her religious affiliation and birthplace. She was reported to be 16 years old, and to hail from the Russian city of Chelyabinsk. By January 2005, it had been revealed that she was half-Georgian and half-Russian, and that she was not actually Muslim.

=== Promotion and live performances ===
==== Image and promotion ====
Despite the generally uncontroversial lyrical content of Shevlyakova's recordings, Shapovalov oversaw a highly controversial campaign to promote her debut, in which Shevlyakova adopted the persona of a shahid — a female Muslim suicide bomber dressed in "black widow" clothing and hijab. As part of the promotional campaign, posters showing a close-up of Shevlyakova's face were posted around Moscow. The music video for her debut single, posted to her website, interspersed videos of the Middle East with flashing on-screen words including "oil", "Al-Qaeda", "Iraq", and "NASDAQ", before depicting Shevlyakova "blowing herself up". Shapovalov stated that he considered it to be a "musical message" rather than a "video clip". An edited version of the video shows Shevlyakova as she films herself and news channels around the world broadcast her video, with headlines such as "Troubled times for the oil industry". The video was sent to Russian TV stations, as well as some international networks like CNN and BBC. Although Al Jazeera expressed some interest in the video, none aired it.

Her first concert was promoted as a "terror concert", scheduled to be performed in the House of Unions on the third anniversary of the September 11 attacks. Shapovalov reportedly paid $10,000 to rent the performance space. The concert tickets were designed to resemble plane tickets, and Pravda reported that concert promotional materials indicated that its objective was to "let the audience experience the horror of a terrorist attack on board a passenger jet". Shevlyakova planned to carry her microphone on a belt to make it look like an explosive, while video screens behind her were slated to display terror footage as bodyguards wearing camouflage clothing fired paintballs upon the audience. Shapovalov also announced plans to stage a similar concert in Britain, claiming that multiple British record labels had expressed interest in releasing n.A.T.o.'s debut album.

==== Controversy ====
The concept of Shevlyakova's first concert, as well as her promotional materials and music video, drew extensive criticism from journalists, music commentators, and government officials, as well as sparking "outrage" in the Russian media. Russian broadcasters were reported to be "afraid" to air the video for "Chor Javon". Aleksandr Sokolov, Russia's Minister of Culture, condemned the concert as "sick" and argued that Shapovalov "should be jailed for doing this after so many people died across Russia in the past weeks". Aleksey Krymin, another official from the Ministry of Culture, called the planned concert "absolutely politically incorrect in form", but added that Shevylyakova's lyrics were "neutral" and that the Ministry had no legal means of preventing the performance.

The act also drew criticism outside of Russia. The Muslim Council of Britain encouraged people to ignore the concert, calling it "tasteless" and accusing it of seeking to make money from recent tragedies. A spokesman for the North Atlantic Treaty Organization, which is abbreviated as NATO, remarked that the act sounded like "a big joke" that was not "a very nice thing"; he added that the term "NATO" has no copyright, so although she could not legally use the organization's logo, she was free to use its name. Shapovalov disputed negative characterizations of Shevlyakova's image, insisting that there was nothing inherently violent or offensive about it, and claiming that any negative associations inspired by her image were "born in the minds of the viewers, listeners and readers". He went on to posit that "n.A.T.o. is merely a female singer with a headscarf and a veil", and that if people took offense at that fact, then "that means only one thing – the society is sick and needs to seek treatment."

In "Stage(d) Terrorism", a 2010 essay for the anthology Just Assassins: The Culture of Terrorism in Russia, Welsh film studies professor Birgit Beumers posited that the promotional campaign ultimately "backfired". She observed that the graphic image cultivated by Shapovalov and Shevlyakova was at odds with the "soft lyrics of the songs", and that the "absence of any political message" caused her image to be only a "backdrop to increase sales and media interest". Beumers also noted that the central theme of n.A.T.o.'s image — that of a shahid, blowing herself up — was impossible to recreate, and thus "reveals the limitations of play as a means of ordering the chaos of terror, allowing repetition and using predictable forms that create an illusion of safety." Ultimately, Beumers wrote, n.A.T.o. attempted to turn anxieties about terrorism into a "PR campaign" and "commercial project".

==== Concert cancellation ====
Although n.A.T.o.'s debut concert had been scheduled to take place on 11 September 2004, it was ultimately cancelled following pressure from government officials and public backlash. Prior to its cancellation, the sound engineers withdrew from the performance, due to the Beslan school siege. House of Unions administrators likewise cited the siege, which had taken place from 1 to 3 September, as well as two recent Russian plane crashes as making the performance inappropriate. In response to the cancellation, Shapovalov filed suit in Moscow's Court of Arbitration, arguing that he had not been appropriately notified of the decision, and seeking to force the venue to host the show at a later date. At a press conference, he inquired why the venue was suitable for "corporate parties" but not "a theatrical show". The public relations director for the concert's production company claimed that their rent payment was refunded weeks later, and that the Culture Ministry had raised no objections when shown the concert's promotional materials. Shapovalov initially indicated that he did not plan to seek an alternate venue for the show, citing the acoustic qualities of the House of Unions.

n.A.T.o.'s debut concert eventually took place in January 2005 at The Tinkov Brewery, a Moscow nightclub. The concert opened with Middle East news footage from CNN, which faded into a techno beat; Shevlyakova closed out the show with a performance of "Chor Javon". Audience members reportedly voiced disappointment that the performance wasn't "more radical".

== Discography ==
Studio album

- nATo (2005)
1. Чорчовон / Chorjavon
2. Бе Умиде / Be Umide
3. Ратминда / Ratminda
4. Нолои / Noloi
5. Ветер Моря / Seawind
6. Джуни Ман / Djuni Man
7. Чаки / Chaki
8. Твалеби / Tvalebi
9. Хиды / Hidy

Single

- Chor Javon (Enhanced CD) (2005)
1. Chor Javon (JS16 Mix)
2. Chor Javon (Extended Version)
3. Chor Javon (Original Version)

Video - Chor Javon
