= Oksana Pochepa =

Russian singer and model (born 1984)

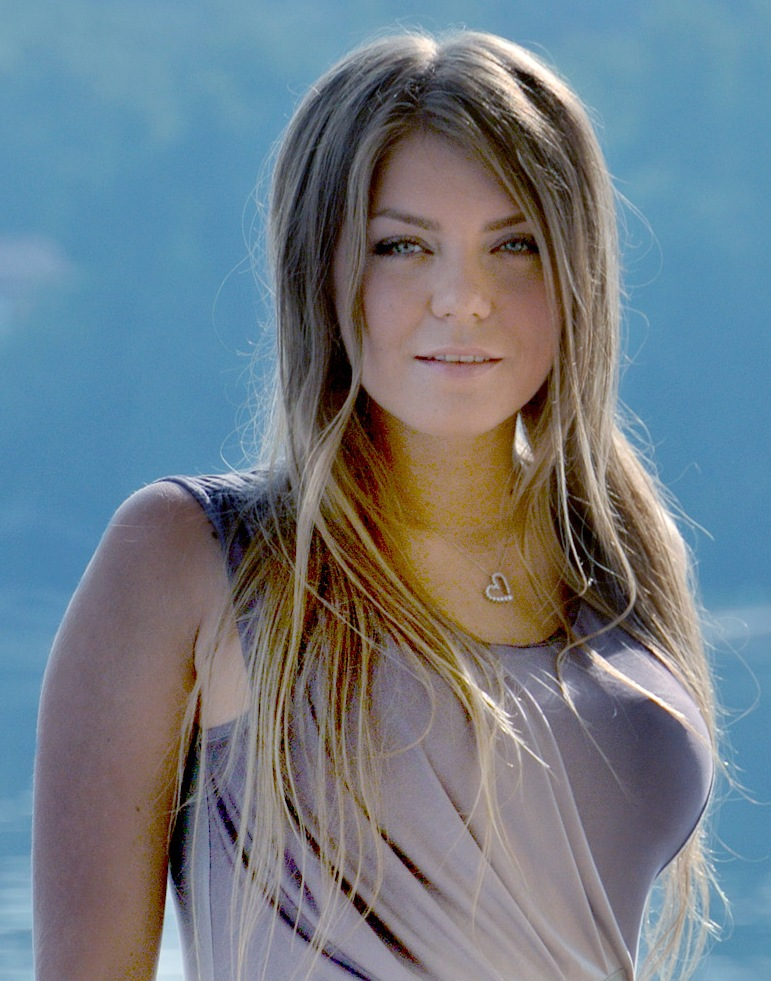
- Pochepa in 2013

Background information
- Also known as: Akula
- Born: Oksana Aleksandrovna Pochepa; 20 July 1984 (age 42); Rostov-on-Don, USSR
- Genres: Pop
- Occupations: pop singer, model
- Website: pochepa.ru

Oksana Aleksandrovna Pochepa (Russian: Оксана Александровна Почепа) (born 20 July 1984 in Rostov-on-Don) is a Russian pop singer and model.

Pochepa first appeared on the Russian music charts when she was 13 years old. She performed in a band called Maloletka (aka Малолетка; "Jailbait"/ "Underaged"), and sang under the pseudonym of Akula (Shark). In 2001, she released her first solo album, Kislotniy DJ (Acidic DJ). She has performed with Ruki Vverh! She has released both of her albums on the well-known label APC Records.

In 2007, she appeared in a Maxim magazine photo shoot.

== Discography ==
=== Maloletka ===
- 1999: Где-то звёзды (Gde-to zvyozdy/There are stars somewhere)

=== Akula ===
- 2001: Кислотный DJ (Kislotnyĭ DJ/Acid DJ)
- 2002: Без любви (Bez lyubvi/Without love)
- 2006: Такая любовь (Takaya lybov/Such love)

=== Oksana Pochepa ===
- 2010: Акула (Akula/Shark)
- 2014: Звезда (Zvezda/Star)
