= Oh Darling (band) =

American pop quartet

- Origin: Portland, Oregon, United States
- Genres: Pop, rock
- Years active: 2006–present
- Members: Daven Hall; Jasmine Ash; J. Marie Hall; Jake Endicott
- Website: ohdarlingmusic.com

Oh Darling is an American pop quartet, based in Los Angeles, California.

== History ==
Guitarist Daven Hall, singer and keyboardist Jasmine Ash, bassist J. Marie Hall and drummer Jake Endicott started making music together in 2006 in Portland, Oregon, and relocated to Los Angeles in 2009.

Their latest album, Brave the Sound, was recorded in the band's home studio in Echo Park, Los Angeles, and was produced by guitarist Daven Hall. Mixed by Nate Anderson, the record includes songs such as "Love" (featured on the ABC series Ugly Betty) and "Prettiest Thing", which was used in the soundtrack to Disney's film Prom (2011).

Songs from their previous albums have been featured on television series, including the CW's One Tree Hill, Lifetime's Drop Dead Diva and United States's Royal Pains.

The group has toured the West Coast, playing venues including the Doug Fir, The Viper Room, Spaceland and the Hotel Café. They have opened for The 88, Fitz and the Tantrums, Anya Marina and The Watson Twins.

=== Film and television ===
- Volkswagen national television commercial – "Colorful Day"
- Ugly Betty television show – "L.O.V.E."
- Royal Pains television show – "Colorful Day" and "Prettiest Thing"
- Prom (2011) – "Prettiest Thing"

=== Discography ===
==== Albums ====
- Nice Nice (2007)
- Oh Darling (2009)
- Brave the Sound (2011)
- Beauty in Commotion (2013)

== See also ==
- List of bands from Los Angeles
- Culture of Portland, Oregon
- Music of Los Angeles
- Music of Oregon
