= Ivan Shapovalov =

Russian record producer

- Иван Шаповалов
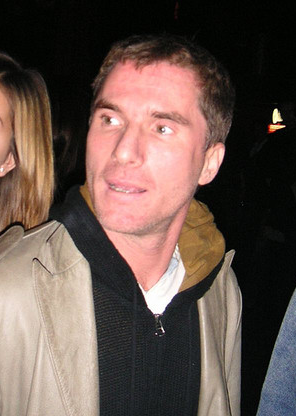
- Shapovalov in 2005
- Born: 28 May 1966 (age 60); Kotovo, Russian SFSR, Soviet Union
- Occupation: Musical producer
- Spouse: Elena Kiper (divorced)
- Parent(s): Nikolay Aleksandrovich Shapovalov; Nadezhda Richardovna Shapovalova

Ivan Nikolayevich Shapovalov (Cyrillic: Иван Николаевич Шаповалов, born 28 May 1966) is a musical producer based in Moscow, Russia. He is best known for being the founder and former executive producer/manager for t.A.T.u.

== Career ==
=== Pre-2004: Early work and t.A.T.u. ===
Before becoming a music producer, Shapovalov worked as a child psychologist, as well as an advertising executive. In 1999, he began to venture into making music videos. That year, Shapovalov, along with Voitinskyi, Sergio Galoyan, Renski and then-lover Elena Kiper, created t.A.T.u., where most of Shapovalov's success would come from. He directed the music video of t.A.T.u's 2000 single "Ya Soshla S Uma" ("All the Things She Said"). Ivan led the girls to stardom as their producer, with a controversial image, and producer of the production company Neformat, which he and Renski formed.

In May 2003, while t.A.T.u. was filming the trailer for their entry in the Eurovision Song Contest 2003, Shapovalov was arrested for disturbing the peace after organizing 200 girls for filming in front of the Kremlin. Also in 2003, Shapovalov formed the project Podnebesnaya to develop his producing skills. He ended up working with many artists, and becoming the producer of 7B and n.A.T.o.

However, in 2004, t.A.T.u. decided to break off from Shapovalov (and Neformat) and continue alone. t.A.T.u. was soon re-signed to Universal Music, appointing Boris Renski as their head producer.

=== 2004-2005: n.A.T.o. ===
In 2004, Shapovalov started a new musical project with sixteen-year old singer Natalia Shevliakova, whom he discovered online. Under the name n.A.T.o., Shevliakova portrayed a shaheed (Islamic suicide bomber) who sang Persian-language songs about love and loss in a musical style similar to that of t.A.T.u. The music video for her debut single, "Chor Javon", depicted Shevliakova appearing on global news channels and blowing herself up; following controversy, it was removed from her website. Shapovalov maintained that Shevliakova's image was not inherently violent, stating that "associations are born in the minds of the viewers, listeners and readers" and argued that "n.A.T.o. is merely a female singer with a headscarf and a veil". Her debut concert, to be held on the third anniversary of the September 11 attacks, drew condemnation from Russian government officials and was cancelled following the Beslan school siege. Shapovalov pursued legal action against the venue that cancelled the event, claiming that he had not been appropriately notified of the cancellation. He also suggested that the venue was hypocritical, as they hosted corporate events but not what he called "a theatrical show". n.A.T.o. eventually made her live debut at Tinkov Brewery, a Moscow nightclub, in January 2005. n.A.T.o. was considered an unsuccessful project, as audiences regarded the performance as underwhelming and the promotion did not generate strong sales for her debut album.
