= Julia Volkova =

Russian singer (born 1985)

- Юля Волкова
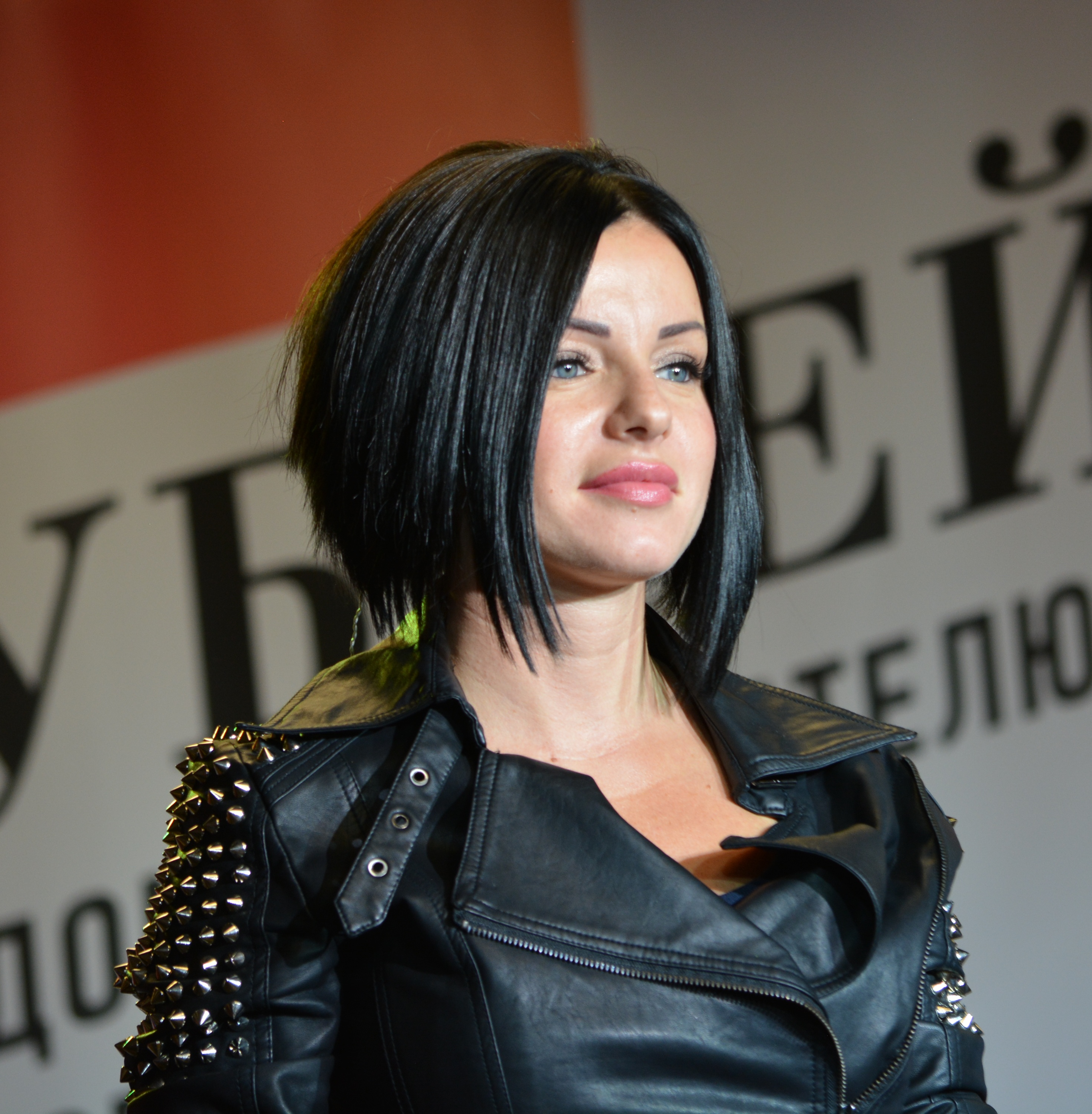
- Volkova in 2014
- Born: Yulia Olegovna Volkova; 20 February 1985 (age 41); Moscow, Russian SFSR, Soviet Union
- Occupation: Singer
- Years active: 1994–present
- Children: 2
- Musical career
- Genres: Pop; rock; electronica
- Instruments: Vocals; piano; guitar
- Labels: T.A. Music; Gala Records
- Member of: t.A.T.u.
- Formerly of: Neposedi

Yulia Olegovna Volkova (Russian: Юлия Олеговна Волкова; born 20 February 1985), better known by the alternative spelling of Julia, is a Russian singer best known for being a member of the Russian girl group t.A.T.u., along with Lena Katina. Formed in Moscow, Russia by Ivan Shapovalov in 1999, the group signed a record deal with Universal Music Russia, and eventually Universal's sub-label Interscope Records in 2001.

The group's first single, "All the Things She Said", topped the charts in countries including Australia, Austria, Denmark, Germany, Ireland, Italy, New Zealand, Spain, Switzerland, and the United Kingdom, but also generated controversy due to the girls kissing onscreen. The group recorded three studio albums in English, including their bestselling 200 km/h in the Wrong Lane, three Russian albums, and four compilation albums. They also worked on other projects, including the 2011 film You and I, and opened T.A. Music, a Russia-based record label. In March 2011, t.A.T.u.'s management issued a press release officially stating that the duo had split.

Volkova signed a solo contract with Gala Records in June 2011, and released her debut single, "All Because of You", in November 2011. The song was also released in a Russian-language version under the title "Сдвину мир" (I'll Change the World). Her worldwide debut single, titled "Didn't Wanna Do It", was released on 21 August 2012.

== Life and career ==
=== 1985–1994: Early years and career beginning ===
Volkova was born on 20 February 1985 in Moscow, Russia, to a middle-class family. Her father, Oleg Volkov, was a businessman and her mother, Larissa Volkova, was a hairdresser. At the age of 6, Volkova enrolled in music school and began learning how to play the piano. When she was 9, she became a member of Russia's children's choir Neposedy, where she would meet future fellow t.A.T.u. singer Lena Katina. At age 11, Volkova transferred to a school fostering artistic talent, and three years later left Neposedy to join t.A.T.u. She has insisted that she was banned from Neposedy for misbehaving, but Neposedy representatives deny this, saying that she simply graduated as all of their members did at a certain age.

=== 1999–2011: Formation of t.A.T.u. ===
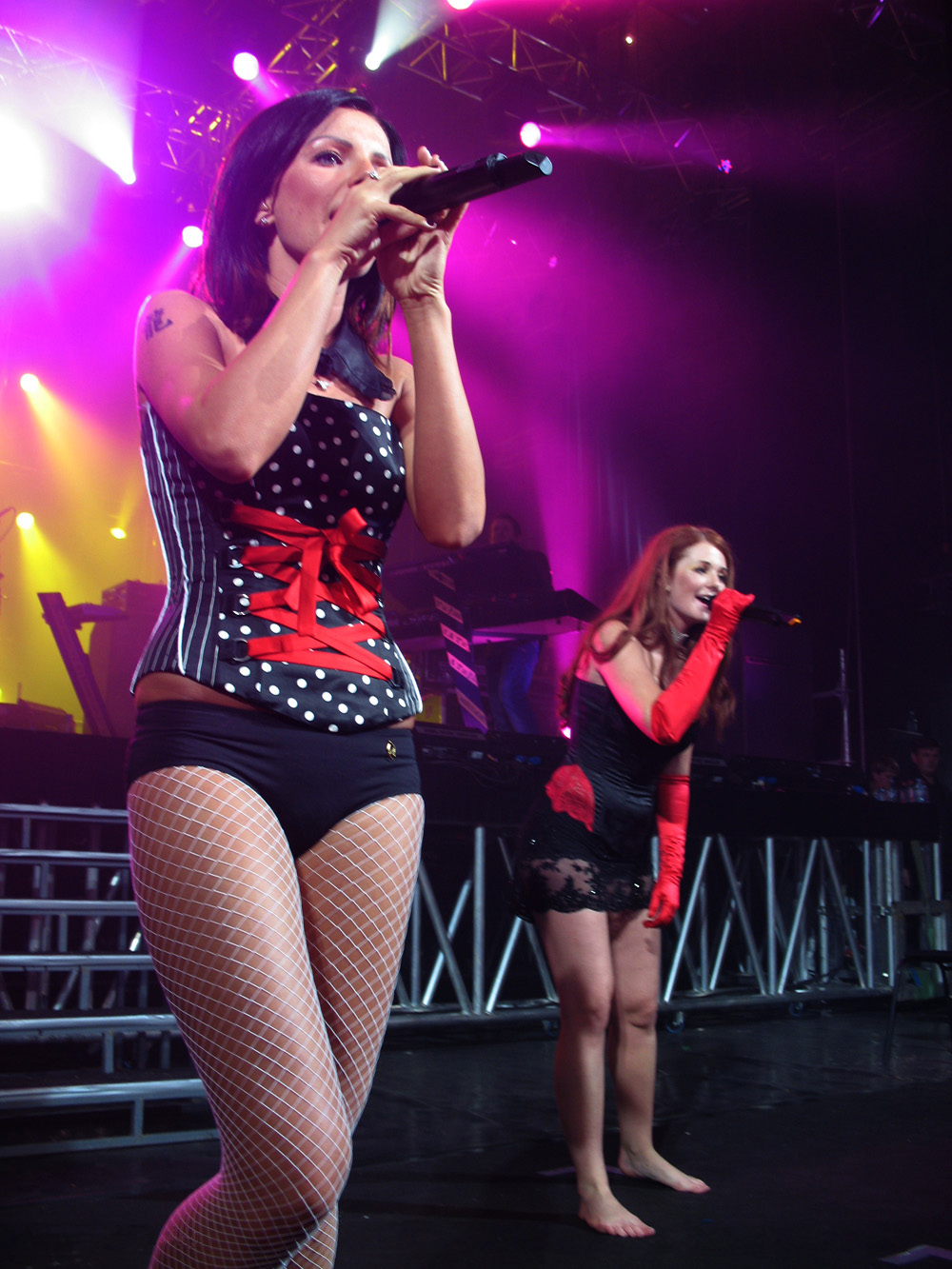
t.A.T.u. performing in Moscow, Russia in 2008

Creator and former manager of t.A.T.u., Ivan Shapovalov, formulated the image of the duo in order to capitalise on the common fascination and fantasy of schoolgirl lesbians, and to appeal to a diverse fan base. Shapovalov managed the act until 2004, when the two performers came out and revealed that Shapovalov had implemented the lesbian persona, and that they were even told what to say in interviews.

t.A.T.u. soon became the most successful Russian group of all time, scoring a number of hits with "All the Things She Said", "Not Gonna Get Us", and "All About Us". They also took part in the Eurovision Song Contest 2003 and finished third with "Ne Ver', Ne Boysia", only three points behind the winner, Turkey. They recorded three English-language studio albums: 200 km/h in the Wrong Lane, Dangerous and Moving, and Waste Management; three Russian-language studio albums were issued: 200 Po Vstrechnoy, Lyudi Invalidy, and Vesyolye Ulybki.

Many Russian websites started claiming Volkova had left t.A.T.u. to go solo in March 2009. The official blog rejected the claims that she had quit but stated that both girls would be doing separate solo projects from now on and that t.A.T.u. was no longer a full-time job.

It was announced in March 2011 that t.A.T.u. was officially disbanded. The duo celebrated their twelve years together, and released two remix albums, titled Waste Management Remixes pt. 1 and Waste Management Remixes pt. 2.

=== 2011–2025: Musical work after t.A.T.u. ===
After the breakup of t.A.T.u., Volkova made an announcement on her YouTube channel, launching her website and mentioning that she was working on a solo album in Moscow and Los Angeles.

On 16 August 2011, Volkova announced on her website as well as on Facebook and Twitter that she had officially signed with Russian label Gala Records, a subsidiary of EMI records. She also stated that her new single, "All Because of You/Сдвину мир", would be released in late August, with an accompanying video. Two weeks after the announcement, her official site reported that the singer would be returning to the studio to complete an additional recording session for "All Because of You/Сдвину мир", and that the single would be officially released in October. For a third time, the release was postponed until November. Though fans hoped for "All Because of You" to premiere on the radio prior to Volkova's South American tour, it was planned to premiere during her first performance in Rio de Janeiro on 17 November 2011. The Russian version, "Сдвину мир", premiered on Lenta.ru on 11 November 2011. The song was recorded in Sweden and was produced by Niclas Molinder, Joacim Persson, Johan Fransson, Tim Larsson, and Tobias Lundgren. A music video accompanied it, directed by Evan Winter. The music video was released on 2 December 2011, premiering on Ello.com and Volkova's website.

Volkova also announced she would travel to South America for a promotional tour, where she would perform some songs by t.A.T.u. and some of her solo material. "All Because of You" peaked at number 247 in her native Russia.

On 1 March 2012, it was reported by the press that Volkova was one of the 25 artists in the final selection who would be competing in order to represent Russia at the Eurovision Song Contest 2012 in Baku, Azerbaijan. Russian broadcaster RTR later confirmed her participation. She entered the competition together with Eurovision 2008 winner Dima Bilan as a duo, with the song "Back to Her Future". They finished in second place with 29.25 points, behind the winning entry, "Party for Everybody", by Russian ethno-pop band Buranovskiye Babushki, with 38.51 points.

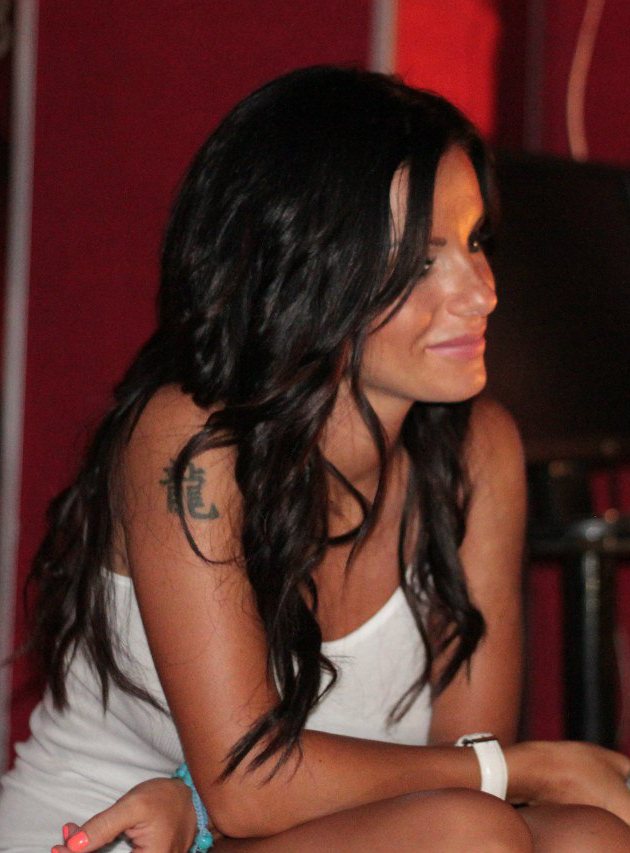
Julia Volkova in 2012

On 11 July 2012, Volkova's Facebook administrator announced on the t.A.T.u. page that Volkova was finishing her second single, titled "Didn't Wanna Do It", due out in July 2012. It was to be her first worldwide single.

In late 2012, Volkova had surgery on her vocal cords and continued to perform while recovering. In 2013, she launched her own line of shoes, C & C shoes by Julia Volkova.

In 2014, Volkova held a series of performances with her former bandmate Lena Katina under their previous name, t.A.T.u., which culminated in a television performance for the Olympic Games in Russia. However, shortly after, Katina accused Volkova of blackmailing her, putting an end to t.A.T.u. as a band. Volkova denied the accusations. A single they had recorded, "Любовь в каждом мгновении" ("Love in Every Moment"), was released as a collaboration rather than as a t.A.T.u. song, and also included the artists Ligalize and Mike Tompkins.

In October 2015, Volkova released the single "Держи рядом". In 2016, the singer talked for the first time about her disease, revealing that in 2012, she was diagnosed with thyroid cancer. During a complex surgery to remove the tumour, her laryngeal nerve was damaged, causing her to lose her voice. She has sought further treatment to recover her singing ability. That year, Volkova also published the new song "Спасите, люди, мир". Another single, "Просто забыть", came out in June 2017.

Volkova returned to releasing music for the first time in over eight years, with the single "История о новом", which came out on 24 October 2025.

=== 2025–present: t.A.T.u. reunion ===
In 2025, Julia reunited with Lena Katina as t.A.T.u., marking the duo's return to performing together following their previous appearances in 2022 and 2023. On 19 July 2025, the duo performed at the Mriya Resort in Yalta, Crimea.

They subsequently performed two concerts at the TAU venue in Moscow on 24 and 25 October 2025; a single date had originally been scheduled, with a second added in response to demand. A run of dates in Mexico followed later that year, and the duo also travelled to Japan for a Gosha Rubchinskiy collaboration, their first visit to the country in twelve years.

In 2026, t.A.T.u. continued performing together with appearances in Russia, Mexico and Brazil. The duo were announced among the headliners of VK Fest 2026 and performed at the festival in Saint Petersburg on 5 July and in Moscow on 19 July. Two planned concerts in Georgia did not take place: a show at the Tbilisi Sports Palace scheduled for 30 January 2026, which would have been the duo's first in the country, was called off, as was a 1 August 2026 performance at the Batumi tennis courts.

== Acting career ==
In 1996 and 1998, Volkova participated in sketches from the children's comedy TV show Yeralash.

Volkova made her film début alongside Lena Katina and Mischa Barton in the film You and I, the story of two teenage girls who meet and fall in love at a Moscow t.A.T.u. concert. The film is based on the novel t.A.T.u. Come Back, which was in turn based on true events.

In August 2011, Volkova participated in the shooting of the movie Zombie Fever (previously titled Fear Mongers and also 9½ Zombies). According to the post on her official site, Zombie Fever is a Russian-language zombie horror/comedy movie shot on location in Minsk, Belarus. Produced by New Wave Production in the style of such films as Zombieland or Shaun of the Dead, Zombie Fever premiered on 15 August 2013 in Russia under the local title Zombie holidays 3D. Volkova plays the heroine, Natasha.

The video for the song "Любовь в каждом мгновении" ("Love in Every Moment") was launched as a short film named Together Apart in 2014 as part of project CORNETTO's CUPIDITY. In the film, Volkova is one of the cupids who try to make a young couple, in a long-distance romance, get together. Also on 18 February 2014, the singer/actress made a cameo in an episode of the Slovak daily television series Panelák.

== Political career ==
In April 2021, Volkova announced that she would be standing in the September 2021 Russian legislative elections as the United Russia candidate to represent Ivanovo in the State Duma. In the primary election for the party's nomination, Volkova received only 919 votes, losing to Mikhail Kizeev, a relatively unknown member of the Ivanovo Oblast Duma, who received over 36,000 votes.

== Personal life ==
In May 2004, Volkova announced that she was pregnant by her then longtime boyfriend Pavel Sidorov, which caused some controversy due to Sidorov already having a wife and daughter. Their daughter, Viktoria "Vika" Pavlovna Volkova, was born on 23 September 2004, in Moscow. Volkova does not keep in contact with Sidorov.

In 2007, Volkova had a long-term relationship with Uzbek businessman Parviz Yasinov. The press reported that she and Yasinov got married. Volkova gave birth to a boy named Samir on 27 December 2007, again in Moscow. In 2008, it was speculated by the media that she was diagnosed with postpartum depression, but it was never confirmed. In 2010, Volkova confirmed that she and Yasinov had broken up, but denied claims that she had been separated from her son.

In 2012, Volkova was diagnosed with stage I papillary thyroid cancer. She underwent surgery at a Moscow hospital, during which her thyroid was removed, along with the tumor itself. During the surgery, her vocal nerves were damaged and she lost the ability to speak properly. The tumor did not metastasize and she did not require chemotherapy; instead, she underwent hormonal therapy. Volkova later underwent two surgeries to restore her vocal cords in Israel and was treated twice in Germany. The treatments were unsuccessful, though she got another surgery in South Korea and was later able to recover her voice. In 2019, she had a relapse of cancer, underwent a course of treatment, and became cancer-free again in October of the same year.

=== Religion ===
In March 2013, Volkova confirmed in Hello Magazine that she converted to Islam in 2010, saying, "I don't wear typical Muslim clothes, but I converted to Islam because it's the closest to my heart." When asked if she would want to live in a Muslim country, she answered, "Why not?" In 2017, she returned to Eastern Orthodox Christianity.

=== Sexuality ===
In many interviews, Volkova has officially confirmed that she is bisexual, stating, "I still like boys and girls. Even my current husband, Volodya, sitting in front of me, would confirm that he knows about my stories with girls. For me, this is a current issue. Quite recently, I had a girlfriend that I liked ... This is not even the echoes of the past, this is what I now live in..."

=== Homophobic remarks ===
In September 2014, Volkova appeared as a contestant on a Ukrainian game show called Lie Detector and made comments considered to be homophobic. The show's host asked the singer if she would condemn her son for being gay, to which Volkova responded, "Yes, I would condemn him because I believe that a real man must be a real man...a man has no right to be a fag". In spite of this, she also said, "Two girls together—not the same thing as two men together. It seems to me that lesbians look aesthetically much nicer..." She also stated that she is not "against gays" and that they are still "better than murderers, thieves, or drug addicts". Nevertheless, her perspective on male homosexuality sparked outrage on social media, where she was seen as extremely hypocritical and biased.

Her former bandmate, Lena Katina, reacted by saying, "God is teaching us to live in love, to be tolerant and not to judge other people!...I think everybody should be free to love who they love and be with who they want to spend their life with!" Later that month, Volkova appeared to have addressed the comments at a concert, stating, "[I]t is impossible to love each other and then just forget everything. It is impossible. And I am very happy to see those people here today with whom this relationship survived. And this relationship will go a long long time no matter what". She went on to say, "The only thing that is important is feeling...inside" and "I love you very much, honestly, and I never said I don't".

=== Feud with Lena Katina ===
The feud between Volkova and Katina started when Volkova expressed her opinion on Katina's solo career back in 2010, saying: "She has the right to [sing t.A.T.u. songs], but it's so stupid, absolutely stupid. If you do a solo career, it means that you do your own work. Her stuff that she makes, I think, is silly and very soon her career will wither away and disappear." Katina responded to this via her YouTube page, saying: "I saw Julia's interview. Of course I got upset. But I want to tell everybody that I have a completely opposite attitude towards the whole situation, Julia's project included. I believe she's a very talented person and I sincerely hope that she'll be successful in all the things she plans." The group officially disbanded in 2011.

In a January 2012 interview, Volkova stated that she no longer communicates with Lena Katina. The duo reunited briefly in 2012–14 with a performance at The Voice of Romania while promoting the re-released edition of 200 km/h in the Wrong Lane; a concert in Kyiv; and a pre-opening performance at the 2014 Winter Olympics in Sochi. On 17 February 2014, Katina posted a video message on her official YouTube channel stating that she would no longer be working with Volkova. However, on 20 February, Volkova posted a video message saying that there is "no big reunion" but t.A.T.u. were having "joint projects". She also criticised Katina's "meaning" behind the video and confirmed that they would be shooting a video for the new single. On 5 March 2014, Volkova posted another video message on her official YouTube channel in response to Katina's video. She stated that despite "reasons of severe trepidation on the part of Lena about [Volkova] and [her] behaviour," collaboration between the two was possible, referring to the release of their new single as well as their music video.

On 22 May 2014, both singers introduced the video Together Apart at the Cannes Film Festival, which was part of Cornetto Ru's "A Sight of Cupid" project containing several short films about love. The video accompanied their song "Любовь в каждом мгновении" ("Love in Every Moment"), which was recorded together with musicians Ligalize and Mike Tompkins.

The duo publicly reunited again in May 2016 at the 25th anniversary celebration of the children's musical group Neposedy, which both had been members of before the formation of t.A.T.u. There, together with the children, Volkova sang her song "Спасите, люди, мир"; together with Katina, she sang "Нас не догонят" ("Not Gonna Get Us").

In September 2022, Katina and Volkova performed together under the name t.A.T.u. at the Dinamo Stadium in Minsk, Belarus, as part of the Ovion Show event. This was followed by another performance at a sporting event at the Gazprom Stadium in Saint Petersburg in May 2023.

== Discography ==
=== With Neposedi ===
- 1997: Пусть миром правит любовь (studio album)

=== Solo singles ===
- 2011: "Сдвину мир" / "All Because of You"
- 2012: "Любовь-сука" / "Back to Her Future" (feat. Dima Bilan)
- 2012: "Didn't Wanna Do It" / "Давай закрутим землю"
- 2014: "Любовь в каждом мгновении" (feat. Lena Katina, Ligalize, and Mike Tompkins)
- 2015: "Держи рядом"
- 2016: "Спасите, люди, мир"
- 2017: "Просто забыть"
- 2025: "История о новом"
- 2026: "Bum Bam"

=== Appearances ===
- 2012: Night of Your Life (original demo) – Sergio Galoyan

=== Music videos ===
- 2011 – "All Because of You" / "Сдвину мир"
- 2012 – "Didn't Wanna Do It" / "Давай закрутим землю"
- 2012 – "Любовь-Сука" (feat. Dima Bilan)
- 2014 – "Любовь в каждом мгновении" (feat. Lena Katina, Ligalize, and Mike Tompkins)
- 2015 – "Держи рядом"

== Filmography ==
- Yeralash – various (1996, 1998)
- You and I – herself (2008)
- Zombie holidays 3D – Natasha (2013)
- Together Apart (short film) – Cupid (2014)
- Panelák, season 13, episode 18 – herself (2014)

== See also ==
- LGBT rights in Russia

Preceded by Prime Minister with "Northern Girl"	Russia in the Eurovision Song Contest; 2003 (as part of t.A.T.u.)	Succeeded by Yulia Savicheva with "Believe Me"
