= 7B (band) =

Russian rock band

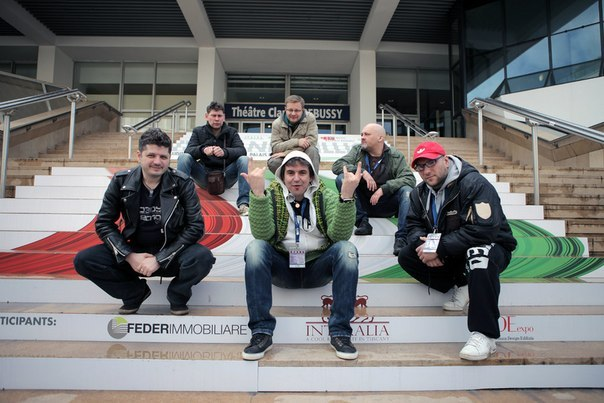
- Russian rock band 7B on MIPIM-2013. Cannes (France).

Background information
- Origin: Moscow, Russia
- Genres: Russian rock, alternative rock, pop rock, folk rock
- Years active: 2001 -- present
- Members: Ivan Demyan - vocals, acoustic guitar, author of music and words, the group leader Andrew "Said" Prosvetov - bass Andrew "Pushkin" Belov - electric and acoustic guitars Stanislav Tsybulsky - keyboards, portable studio Andrew "Katalych" Katalkin - drums, percussion Peter Losev - sound Igor Chernyshev - Director

7B (Russian: 7Б) is a Russian rock band based in Moscow. They have released five studio albums, several reprints and collections.

== History ==
The official birthday of "7B" is March 8, 2001.

In 2022, the band supported 2022 invasion of Ukraine by a concert in Moscow. They further participated in a series of concerts organized in order to support operation.

== Members ==
- Ivan Demyan—vocals, acoustic guitar, author of music and words, the group leader
- Andrew "Said" Prosvetov—bass
- Andrew "Pushkin" Belov—electric and acoustic guitars
- Stanislav Tsybulsky—keyboards, portable studio
- Andrew "Katalych" Katalkin—drums, percussion
- Peter Losev—sound
- Igor Chernyshev—Director

== Discography ==
=== Albums ===
- 2001 — Molodye Vetra (Молодые ветра; Young Winds)
- 2004 — Inoplaneten (Инопланетен; Extraterrestrial)
- 2005 — Otrazhatel (Отражатель; Reflector)
- 2007 — Moya Lyubov (Моя любовь; My Love)
- 2010 — Olimpia (Олимпия; Olympia)
- 2014 — Bessmertnyy (Бессмертный; Immortal)
- 2017 — Solntsu reshat' (Солнцу решать; It's Up to the Sun)

=== Compilations and reissues ===
- 2002 — Molodye Vetra (Pereizdanie) (Молодые ветра (Переиздание); Young Wind (Reissue))
- 2005 — Inoplaneten (Pereizdanie) (Инопланетен (Переиздание); Extraterrestrial (Reissue))
- 2006 — The Best
- 2008 — 7 Let. Yubileinui (7 Лет. Юбилейный; 7 Years. Anniversary)
- 2010 — Olympia (Podarochnoe izdanie) (Олимпия (Подарочное издание); Olympia (Gift Edition))
- 2012 — Novaya kolekcia (Luchshie pesni) (Новая коллекция (Лучшие песни); New Collection (The Best Songs))
- 2015 — Mp3play. Muzykal'naya kollektsiya (Mp3play. Музыкальная коллекция; Mp3play. Music Collection)

=== Singles ===
- 2013 — Chernyj drug (Pervyj Internet Maksi Single 13.13.13.) (Черный друг (Первый Интернет Макси Сингл 13.13.13.); Black friend (first Internet Maxi Single 13.13.13.)
- 2013 — Fanat (Vtoroy internet maksi-singl 13.13.13) (Фанат (Второй интернет макси-сингл 13.13.13); Fan (second Internet Maxi Single 13.13.13.)
- 2013 — Lyubov' ne ub'yosh'(Tretiy internet maksi-singl 13.13.13) (Любовь не убьёшь (Третий интернет макси-сингл 13.13.13); You can't kill love (third Internet Maxi Single 13.13.13.)
- 2016 — 41-y fashist (Internet maksi-singl) (41-й фашист (Интернет макси-сингл); The 41st Fascist (Internet Maxi Single)

=== Videos ===
- Molodye vetra (Молодые ветра; Young Wind) (2001)
- Osen` (Осень; Autumn) (2001)
- Inoplaneten (Инопланетен; Extraterrestrial) (2004)
- Zima (Зима; Winter) (2004)
- VIVA! (2004)
- Ya lyubov' (Я любовь; I am Love) (2004)
- Ulichnyi boets (Уличный боец; Street Fighter) (2006)
- Amfibiya (Амфибия; Amphibian) (2008)
- Ptitsa (Птица; Bird) (2009)
- Letim s voiny (Летим с войны; Flying Back from the War) (2011)
- Pomogi mne (Помоги мне; Help Me) (2011)
- Noch` na ekrane (Ночь на экране; Night on the Screen) (2012)
